= In Covid's Wake =

2025 book by Stephen Macedo and Frances E. Lee

- Authors: Stephen Macedo and Frances E. Lee
- Language: English
- Subject: Policy responses to the COVID-19 pandemic in the United States
- Genre: Non-fiction
- Publisher: Princeton University Press
- Publication date: March 2025
- Publication place: United States
- Pages: 392
- ISBN: 9780691267135
- OCLC: 1450712567

In Covid's Wake: How Our Politics Failed Us is a 2025 book by Stephen Macedo and Frances E. Lee that critically examines the policies of the COVID-19 pandemic in the United States and the institutions that promoted them.

In the book, Macedo and Lee argue that political officials abdicated their responsibilities over policy-making when facing the pandemic to scientists and public health officials, who subsequently implemented wide-ranging and intrusive non-pharmaceutical interventions (ignoring a lack of evidence in favor of those interventions and the negative side effects those interventions would have on living standards and the economy) and instigated a moral panic against critics of those interventions, ultimately causing a collapse in public trust and a surge in political polarization over the course of the pandemic.

The book received widespread acclaim in the media and from political scientists, who argued that it offered an insightful critique of political and academic institutions, that it demonstrated clearly the risks of enforcing intrusive consensus on society, and that it constituted an important contribution to literature examining political polarization in the 2020s. The Economist, Compact, The New Yorker, and the Wall Street Journal all named it among the best books of 2025. The book, however, received significantly negative reviews from scientists and medical professionals, who argued that the book misrepresented public health data and the political scene during the pandemic, including downplaying the impact of the virus on health and behavior, downplaying the role of disinformation and conservative politicians in driving pandemic polarization, and uncritically accepting alternative pandemic-response strategies proposed by advocates of the Great Barrington Declaration without questioning their feasibility.

== Background ==
=== Authors ===
Stephen Macedo is an American political scientist based at Princeton University. Macedo's research has largely focused on political theory, American constitutionalism, and public policy, with an emphasis on liberalism. He has previously served as vice-president of the American Political Science Association and as director of Princeton's University Center for Human Values.

Frances E. Lee is also an American political scientist based at Princeton University, a professor at the Princeton School of Public and International Affairs. Her research has focused on American politics, policy-making, and public affairs.

=== Development ===
In an interview with Public Discourse, Macedo stated that the book originated as part of a 2022 project "on the current political moment and the highly polarized politics that we are involved in now. Specifically, about how progressives were not paying sufficient attention to conservative concerns on certain issues in a way that was undermining the strength of progressive arguments and positions. I was planning to focus on abortion, immigration, and COVID. Of the three, COVID — and COVID policy — happened to be the subject I knew the least about. Once I started working on it, I realized that was just a huge topic in itself and one that not many people were working on. So I decided to focus on COVID." In an interview with The Tocqueville Review, he stated that his interest in writing the book was "first and foremost as a window onto our profound political dysfunction, which is the result of an excess of moralized partisanship and extreme polarization, which has infected too many elite institutions including science, journalism, and, unfortunately, universities."

Macedo has stated that Lee joined him on the project after the two co-organized a workshop together on the subject. The workshop notably saw the attendance of health economist and co-author of the Great Barrington Declaration Jay Bhattacharya. Lee has stated that the topic "fit neatly into my pre-existing scholarly interests, especially given that policy in this issue area was profoundly and pervasively shaped by partisanship," saying that during the writing of the book, she "took the lead on the more empirical chapters: tracing the evolution of the policy response across the federal system over time and examining how Covid policy traded off against other public policy issues (e.g., non-Covid health, education, employment, crime, fiscal balance)."

== Summary ==
In the book, Macedo and Lee critically examine the policy responses to the COVID-19 pandemic in the United States. The authors argue that non-pharmaceutical interventions (such as lockdowns, quarantines, social distancing, closures of non-essential businesses and schools, as well as vaccine and mask mandates) had no scientific basis and ran contrary to pre-pandemic guidelines on how to respond to hypothetical pandemics. They argue that leading scientific and public health figures (which they describe as politically progressive and members of the "laptop classes") during the pandemic ignored this and instead told "noble lies" to the public to justify wide-ranging and intrusive implementations of non-pharmaceutical interventions. In an interview with Undark Magazine, Lee elaborated that epidemiologists were "the people who are most focused on the spread of disease by nature of their profession. They’re going to have some tunnel vision around that. Their views about the importance of protecting yourself from a respiratory infection are likely to be systematically different from other people. Their values, then, can’t guide the whole of society. Second, there’s class bias here. These are highly educated people for whom staying home and self-isolating was much more feasible than for the rest of society. So their perspectives on that, and their views on what exactly would be the hardships associated with that, were also biased," while also praising Bhattacharya for "exhibiting integrity as a scientist." The authors also argue that, once COVID-19 vaccine began to be rolled out, these scientific and public health officials promoted the vaccines in a way that overstated the actual evidence base behind the vaccines.

The authors then argued that these "laptop classes" shut down debate over COVID policy, dismissing and smearing dissenting viewpoints while also using thought-terminating clichés such as "follow the science." Among the viewpoints that the authors argue were suppressed were the COVID-19 lab leak theory, the Great Barrington Declaration, the Swedish government response to the COVID-19 pandemic, and skepticism over face mask mandates. They then argue that scientific and public health figures were overly willing to deprioritize freedom and quality of life, were enamoured with the strict Chinese response to the pandemic, were out of touch with the concerns and reality of everyday working class Americans, and following the end of the pandemic crisis, have been unwilling to assess the effects that interventions had. In an interview with The Daily Telegraph about the book, the authors argued that doubts over the responses to the pandemic were silenced by a "wartime mentality" and a "moral panic," with privileged politicians aiming to avoid accountability by deferring policy-making decisions to privileged scientists in a way that also overlooked the effect the policies would have on the working class.

The authors conclude that COVID-19 response policies in the United States became deeply politicized and created widespread confusion among Americans. They also conclude that the policies caused significant harms to public health, education, the economy, and living standards, disproportionately affecting the less well-off in society. As a result, the authors argue that the polices significantly increased political polarization and had a significant negative effect on public trust in scientific and government institutions.

In an interview with The New York Times, Macedo explained "the biggest theme that runs through the book, I think, is that these, as we call them, truth-seeking institutions, did not function as well as they should have during COVID. That there was a premature policy consensus. There was an unwillingness to re-examine assumptions. And there was an intolerance of criticism and divergent points of view that emerged fairly quickly in the pandemic, and that hurt us, that hurt our policy responses, that hurt our ability to course correct over the course of the pandemic as we learned more and had greater reason to course correct."

== Publication history ==
In Covid's Wake: How Our Politics Failed Us was published by Princeton University Press in March 2025.

== Critical reception ==
=== Acclaim ===
J Oliver Conroy of The Guardian has written that "the reception to In Covid’s Wake has been more positive than Macedo and Lee expected."

The book received widespread praise in the news media and among literary critics. The Economist listed the book among its best books of 2025, describing it as "insightful," as did Compact, which described it as "the first comprehensive account of how liberal governance failed the Covid test," and The New Yorker, which wrote that its "conclusions are chastening, clearly demonstrating the risks of enforcing a “consensus” and purging the countervailing views that make intellectual inquiry work." The Wall Street Journal listed it as one of the top ten books of 2025. Columnist George Will of The Washington Post reviewed the book positively, saying that it was "dismaying, but also exhilarating... Macedo and Lee identify much broader and deeper cultural sicknesses. But their meticulous depictions and plausible explanations of the myriad institutional failures demonstrate social science at its finest." Columnist David Scharfenberg of The Boston Globe praised the book as "scathing," saying that it "feels convincing — in no small part because Macedo and Lee are of the liberal, data-driven tribe they critique." The New Yorker staff writer Jessica Winter compared it to the 2025 book An Abundance of Caution that criticized the policies of school closures during COVID in the United States, saying that it was "a similarly brutal COVID postmortem." Financial Times columnist Edward Luce praised the book as "seminal," saying that it helped explained the rise of the far-right in the 2020s and "should be compulsory reading across the spectrum. That it has not been reviewed by most major newspapers is troubling."

The book also received broadly positive reviews from political scientists. Writing in The Gospel Coalition, political scientist Hunter Baker of North Greenville University praised the book as "a powerful case study," saying that "the account they offer is devastating." Writing in The Free Press, political scientist Martin Gurri of George Mason University praised the book as "formidable," describing it as "a calm and meticulous dissection of an appalling moment—a horror story told through an accumulation of carefully researched details in which our leaders, faced with an unexpected disaster, compounded the misery by their incompetence and dishonesty." Writing in the Claremont Review of Books, political scientist Joseph M. Bessette of Claremont McKenna College praised the book as "timely," saying that the authors "provide a searing indictment of public health experts’ and political elites’ response to the COVID pandemic that imposed on the American citizenry restrictions “more sweeping and disruptive than any that had been previously contemplated in Western pandemic plans.”" Writing in Commonweal, political philosopher Jason Blakely of Pepperdine University praised the book as "intellectually brave and ideologically iconoclastic," saying that it was "the best book to date on the politics of the Covid-19 pandemic." Legal scholar and Princeton University president Christopher L. Eisgruber described the book as "essential reading for many reasons, including the light it sheds on arguments about the conditions required for robust, truth-seeking scholarship and debate at universities. Too often, people who talk about “viewpoint diversity” in higher education assume that it means having a balance of liberals and conservatives, or that it requires universities to mirror disagreements from the political realm." Economist Gigi Foster of the University of New South Wales wrote that the book "presents a more balanced and wide-ranging history of the COVID era than any other book I have yet seen published by a mainstream publishing house," while criticizing the authors for not going far enough in recognising that "during COVID the ‘learned professions’ of whom the authors and I are members betrayed their principles and their countries."

The book also received widespread praise among right-wing and libertarian think tanks. David R. Henderson of the Cato Institute praised the book as "excellent." Philip Wallach of the American Enterprise Institute praised the book for the "disarming plainness" with which the authors state their case, describing the book as "a plea to academia to clean its own house and so avoid the more indiscriminate scourges that politics may eventually bring." Tim Duncan of the Institute of Public Affairs said that the book was "worth a very close read," praising the authors for documenting the "strange rise and global triumph of the China model for pandemic management" and saying that "the parallels with current thinking on global warming are hair-raising." Writing for the Acton Institute, Jeffrey Polet of Hope College wrote that "Macedo and Lee effectively demonstrate that ideology and self-interest rather than science drove COVID-era policies and that Americans will be paying a high price for progressive hubris for years to come. One must give credit to Macedo especially: He demonstrates genuine scholarly integrity in admitting his errors."

=== Criticism ===
Twitter executive Yoel Roth has complained on Bluesky that the book misquoted him: his attempt to debunk a persistent myth that the FBI demanded Twitter censor dissenting COVID viewpoints was quoted as though he was endorsing the myth. Thomas Bollyky, the lead author of one of the studies cited by the authors to claim that there was no difference in mortality between red states and blue states, criticized the authors for their interpretation of his study, saying that "I feel like I’m having an Annie Hall–type moment. These interventions were designed to reduce infections, and that’s exactly what they did." Epidemiologist Michael Osterholm of the University of Minnesota, whose early criticism of lockdowns was cited by the authors, stated that the authors overlooked the fact that he had changed his stance by Autumn 2020 to support non-pharmaceutical interventions until the vaccines could be introduced.

Writing in Science-Based Medicine in March 2025, neurologist Jonathan Howard accused the authors of "ignorance of and indifference to what happened in hospitals," saying that the authors uncritically endorsed the Great Barrington Declaration without examining its feasibility, failed to discuss the sponsorship of the Declaration by the right-wing American Institute for Economic Research, and overlooked that critics of the Declaration also faced significant harassment, including from its authors. Columnist Ryan Cooper of Prospect has claimed that the authors "play fast and loose with statistics," saying that the authors uncritically endorsed the Swedish government response to the COVID-19 pandemic, overlooking that the Swedish mortality rate prior to the introduction of vaccines was among the worst in Europe, with low mortality only coming after the Swedish government's rapid rollout of boosters in the face of further waves. Biologist Joshua Weitz claimed that "Macedo and Lee misrepresent what actually happened during the pandemic... at its core, the premise that the pandemic was not that bad," noting that authors have no expertise in epidemiology, that they overlooked how bad the pandemic could have been if there had been no interventions, and that they failed to discuss the widespread misinformation spread by the political right (including statements made by American president Donald Trump). Epidemiologist and public health scholar Michael A. Stoto called the book "revisionist history" that is "seriously biased. Everything they say has a kernel of truth, but the public health science side is not presented."

In a Boston Review forum published in June 2025, infectious disease epidemiologist Adam Kucharski, professor at the London School of Hygiene & Tropical Medicine and lead author of one of the earliest peer-reviewed studies estimating the impact of China's control measures in 2020, criticized Macedo and Lee for failing to interview or speak with scientists in the course of writing their book and for using "a flawed methodology for evaluating the impact of infection control measures." Kucharski further criticized the authors' defense of the Great Barrington Declaration, writing: "This is a classic motte-and-bailey argument: a bold, controversial claim is made (somehow vulnerable groups can be shielded, despite everyone else returning to normal, and this was the optimal strategy to take in October 2020), but when challenged, the argument shifts to a more easily defensible claim (lockdowns had negative consequences)."

Also writing in the Boston Review forum, pulmonologist Adam Gaffney of Harvard Medical School criticized Macedo and Lee for focusing only on whether people's lives could be less disrupted by policy, without considering how the disease itself disrupted people's lives (particularly as mortality fell disproportionately on the disadvantaged). Gaffney argued that the authors' analysis fell short of a "careful weighing of costs and benefits" of government policy because it ignored, among other things, evidence about the efficacy of non-pharmaceutical interventions based on other respiratory diseases (such as on rates of influenza and asthma exacerbations, both of which significantly decreased following the use of COVID-19 measures), the voluntary nature of many distancing measures that people took, and the fact that working-class people and people of color were more in favor of school closures than high-income, white people. Macedo and Lee’s main argument, Gaffney wrote, "turns reality on its head."

Writing in The Nation, epidemiologist Gregg Gonsalves of the Yale School of Public Health argued that the book contributing to fueling the Second Trump Administration's Make America Healthy Again programme, saying that Trump-appointed public officials "have set themselves up as persecuted mavericks over the past five years, particularly with their insistence that the measures taken during the Covid pandemic to mitigate it were worse than the virus. They’ve built up this narrative to immunize themselves against scrutiny, and they will use this storyline — particularly and most recently promulgated by Stephen Macedo and Frances Lee at Princeton in their book In Covid’s Wake and heralded by publications like The New Yorker, The Wall Street Journal, and The Economist — as a shield against any accountability."

Staff writer Rogé Karma of The Atlantic wrote in August 2025 that the book was part of a mainstreaming of "pandemic revisionism," saying that "almost everything about [the authors'] narrative is flawed." Specifically, Karma argued that the 2019 WHO report on a hypothetical pandemic that the authors claim demonstrated that there was a pre-pandemic consensus against non-pharmaceutical interventions in fact explicitly endorsed a range of non-pharmaceutical interventions (including mask mandates, non-essential business closures, and travel restrictions), that the relatively low Swedish mortality rate only occurred after the Swedish government's vaccine rollouts (which was significantly faster than most other countries), with a high mortality rate prior to the vaccines, that the authors fail to consider whether the Great Barrington Declaration's proposed responses were actually feasible (with the authors also overlooking that there was in fact genuine academic debate over the Declaration), and that the authors overlooked that the conservative Trump administration was in power at the federal level during all of 2020 (during which it frequently downplayed the pandemic and promoted misinformation), not a progressive administration. In June 2025, the popular podcast If Books Could Kill dedicated a double episode to critically discussing the book.

== See also ==
- An Abundance of Caution
