= William J. Brodsky =

American businessman (born 1944)

William Brodsky

Director of the Securities Investor Protection Corporation
- Incumbent
- Assumed office May 31, 2022
- President: Joe Biden

Personal details
- Born: 1944 (age 80–81)
- Education: Syracuse University (AB, JD)

William J. Brodsky is an American businessman working as a director of the Securities Investor Protection Corporation, executive chairman of the Chicago Board Options Exchange, and chairman of the World Federation of Exchanges.

== Education ==
Brodsky earned a Bachelor of Arts degree from Syracuse University and a Juris Doctor from the Syracuse University College of Law. He was a member of the Phi Epsilon Pi fraternity. Brodsky was advised and influenced by Syracuse law school professor Michael O. Sawyer. He later established the Michael O. Sawyer Chair of Constitutional Law and Politics at Syracuse's Maxwell School of Citizenship and Public Affairs.

While at Syracuse Law School, Brodsky defeated future President Joe Biden for class president by a single vote. To date, Brodsky is the only person to ever beat Biden in a non-primary election.

== Career ==
Brodsky joined Model, Roland & Co. in 1968. Brodsky began career as a securities lawyer at the American Stock Exchange in 1974, and in 1976 became its head of options trading. He formally held the positions of the executive vice president at the American Stock Exchange from 1979 until 1982.

In 1982, he joined Chicago Mercantile Exchange (CME) in as executive vice president and chief operating officer. He was the president and CEO of the CME from 1985 until 1997. He is a member of the Committee on Capital Markets Regulation and previously served as chairman of the International Options Markets Association (2006–2008).

From 1997 to 2013, he was the chairman and CEO of the Chicago Board Options Exchange.

In July 2019, Brodsky was named chairman of Navy Pier Inc., a non-profit corporation that oversees the Navy Pier.

In January 2022, President Joe Biden (and former class president rival) nominated Brodsky to serve as a director of the Securities Investor Protection Corporation. After confirmation by the United States Senate, Brodsky started in this position on May 31, 2022.

== Personal life ==
He is married to Joan (Née: Breier), whom he met while they were students at Syracuse. Two of their sons worked for Biden as interns on Capitol Hill and the families remain close.
