= Frances E. Lee =

American academic

- Born: Anniston, Alabama, U.S.
- Occupations: Political scientist; author; professor

Academic background
- Education: University of Southern Mississippi (BA); Vanderbilt University (PhD)
- Doctoral advisor: Bruce I. Oppenheimer

Frances E. Lee is an American political scientist, specializing in the U.S. Congress, national policymaking, party politics, and representation. Lee is a professor of politics and public affairs at the Princeton School of Public and International Affairs at Princeton University.

== Early life and education ==
Lee graduated from Petal High School in Petal, Mississippi, and was inducted into the Petal High School Academic Hall of Fame in 2012.

Lee graduated with honors from the University of Southern Mississippi with a B.A. in English in 1991. In 1997, she completed her PhD in political science at Vanderbilt University. Her doctoral dissertation, "The enduring consequences of the Great Compromise: Senate apportionment and congressional policymaking," was supervised by Bruce I. Oppenheimer.

== Career ==
She is the author or co-author of several books on the U.S. Congress, including A Case for Congress, The Limits of Party: Congress and Lawmaking in a Polarized Era (with James M. Curry), and Insecure Majorities: Congress and the Perpetual Campaign. The central thesis of Insecure Majorities, that the competitive elections of recent decades have made the political parties less cooperative in office, has found support from many quarters, including then-Senate leader Mitch McConnell, who said, "I think there's a lot to that." Her 2009 book Beyond Ideology has been cited over 900 times in the political science literature. Lee co-authors the leading textbook Congress and Its Members, currently in its twentieth edition.

She is associate editor of the American Journal of Political Science (as of 2025). Lee was the first editor of Cambridge University Press's American Politics Elements Series. From 2014 to 2019, she was co-editor of Legislative Studies Quarterly. She is also the co-author, with Stephen Macedo, of In Covid's Wake: How Our Politics Failed Us, which was listed as a best non-fiction book of 2025 by The Economist, The Wall Street Journal, and The New Yorker.

== Awards and honors ==
Lee's book awards include the American Political Science Association (APSA) Gladys M. Kammerer Award (Best Publication on American National Policy) in 2021 (with James M. Curry) and the APSA Richard F. Fenno Award (Best Book in Legislative Studies) in 2009.

In 2019, she was elected to the American Academy of Arts and Sciences, and, in 2024, to the American Academy of Sciences and Letters.

== Selected works ==
=== Books ===
- Frances E. Lee and Bruce I. Oppenheimer. 1999. Sizing Up the Senate: The Unequal Consequences of Equal Representation. Chicago: University of Chicago Press.
- Frances E. Lee. 2009. Beyond Ideology: Politics, Principles and Partisanship in the U.S. Senate. Chicago: University of Chicago Press.
- Eric Schickler and Frances E. Lee, eds. 2011. The Oxford Handbook of the American Congress. New York: Oxford University Press. Selected by Choice, the American Library Association's reviews publication, as one of its top 25 outstanding academic titles for 2012. Part of the Oxford Handbooks of Political Science series
- Frances E. Lee 2016. Insecure Majorities: Congress and the Perpetual Campaign. Chicago: University of Chicago Press.
- Frances E. Lee and Nolan McCarty, eds. 2019. Can America Govern Itself? New York: Cambridge University Press.
- James M. Curry and Frances E. Lee. 2020. The Limits of Party: Congress and Lawmaking in a Polarized Era. Chicago: University of Chicago Press.
- Roger H. Davidson, Walter J. Oleszek, Frances E. Lee, Eric Schickler, and James M. Curry. 2025. Congress and Its Members, 20th ed. Thousand Oaks: Sage.
- Stephen Macedo and Frances Lee. 2025. In Covid's Wake: How Our Politics Failed Us. Princeton University Press.
- Frances Lee. 2026. A Case for Congress. University of Oklahoma Press.

=== Other publications ===
- Frances E. Lee. 2000. "Senate Representation and Coalition Building in Distributive Politics,” American Political Science Review, 94 (March) 59–72.
- Frances E. Lee. 2003. "Geographic Politics in the U.S. House of Representatives: Coalition Building and Distribution of Benefits,” American Journal of Political Science 47 (November): 713–727. September 2018, p. 3
- Frances E. Lee. 2004. "Bicameral Institutions and Geographic Politics: Allocating Federal Funds for Transportation in the House and Senate,” Legislative Studies Quarterly 24 (May): 185–214.
- Frances E. Lee. 2008. "Agreeing to Disagree: Agenda Content and Senate Partisanship, 1981–2004.” Legislative Studies Quarterly 33 (May): 199–222.
- Frances E. Lee. 2008. "Dividers, Not Uniters: Presidential Leadership and Senate Partisanship, 1981–2004” Journal of Politics 70 (October): 914–928.
- Frances E. Lee. 2013. "Presidents and Party Teams: The Politics of Debt Limits and Executive Oversight, 2001–2013,” Presidential Studies Quarterly 43 (4): 775–791.
- Frances E. Lee. 2015. “How Party Polarization Affects Governance,” Annual Review of Political Science 18 (June): 261–282.
- Frances E. Lee. 2016. “Patronage, Logrolls, and Polarization: Congressional Parties of the Gilded Age, 1876–1896.” Studies in American Political Development 30: 116–127.
- Frances E. Lee. 2018. “The 115th Congress and Questions of Party Unity in a Polarized Era.” Journal of Politics.

=== Editorial service ===
As Editor

- American Journal of Political Science (Associate Editor) (2025- )
- Chicago Studies in American Politics, University of Chicago Press (Series editor) (2018- )
- Legislative Studies Quarterly (Co-editor) (2014–2019)
- Elements Series in American Politics, Cambridge University Press (Founding editor) (2017–2025)

Editorial boards

- American Journal of Political Science (2014–2018)
- American Politics Research (2007–present)
- Congress & the Presidency (2007–present)
- Journal of Politics (2007–2009, 2013–2015)
- Legislative Studies Quarterly (2005–2010)

== Media ==
- Interview with Ezra Klein of Vox Media about gridlock.
- Ezra Klein Show, "Why bipartisanship is irrational."
- Interview on C-SPAN discussing majoritarian rule in the Senate.
- Frances E. Lee. "Repeal-and-Replace Is Probably Doomed. Congress Rarely Works Along Party Lines," The Washington Post, July 21, 2017.
- James M. Curry and Frances E. Lee. "A Senate Majority is Overrated. (We Checked.)," The New York Times, November 18, 2020.
- Frances E. Lee and James M. Curry. "What’s Really Holding the Democrats Back," The Atlantic, April 23, 2021.
- James M. Curry and Frances E. Lee. "There’s a Curse in Washington, and the Party in Control Can’t Seem to Shake It," The New York Times, October 13, 2021.
- Interview on New Books in Political Science Podcast, October 6, 2021.
