= Ro Khanna =

American politician and lawyer (born 1976)

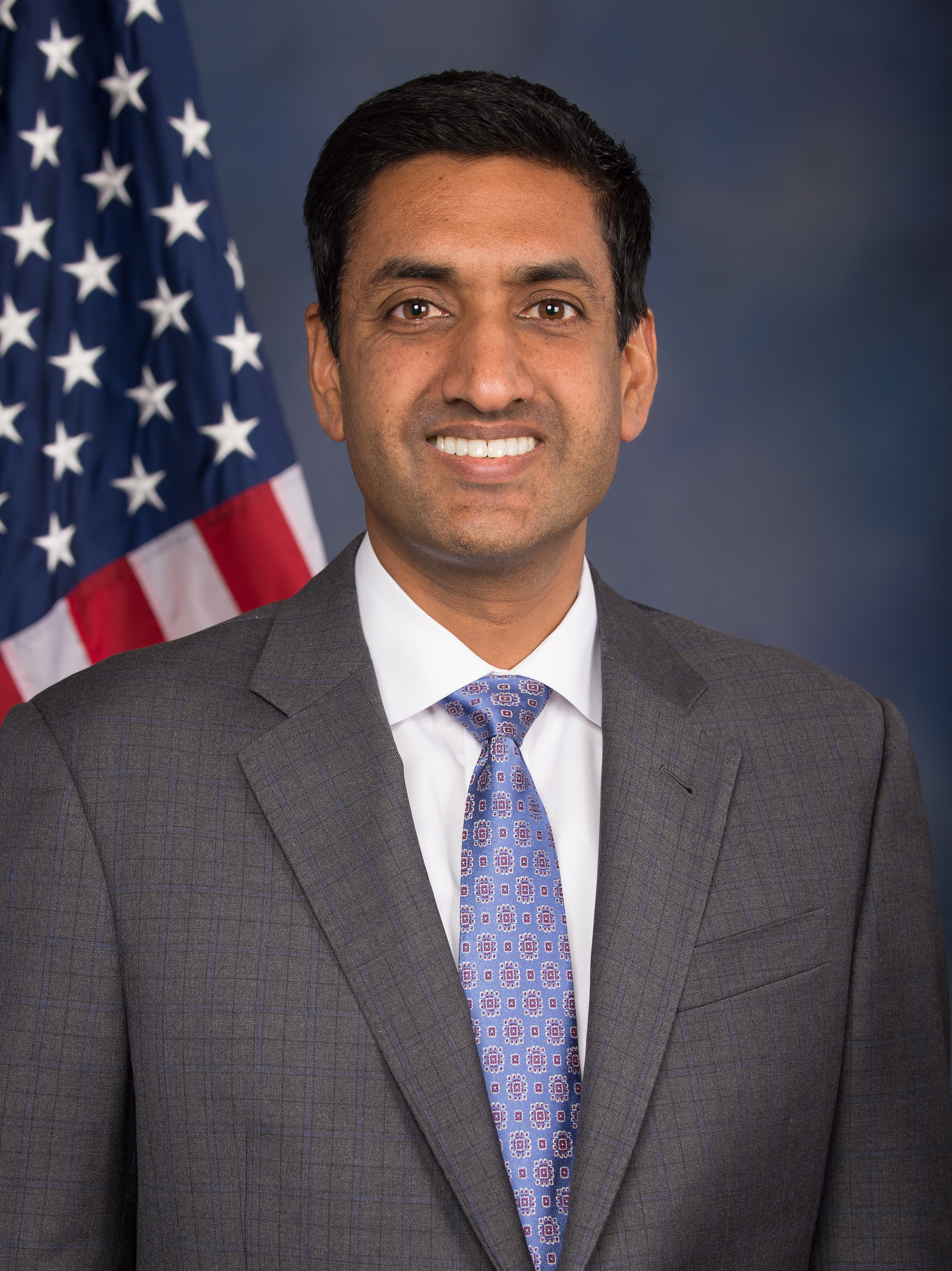
- Official portrait, 2016

Member of the U.S. House of Representatives from California's 17th district
- Incumbent
- Assumed office January 3, 2017
- Preceded by: Mike Honda

Personal details
- Born: Rohit Khanna; September 13, 1976 (age 50) Philadelphia, Pennsylvania, U.S.
- Party: Democratic
- Spouse: Ritu Ahuja (m. 2015)
- Children: 2
- Relatives: Amarnath Vidyalankar (grandfather)
- Education: University of Chicago (BA); Yale University (JD)
- Website: House website Campaign website
- Khanna's voice Khanna supporting his amendment to block military action against Iran without congressional approval. Recorded January 30, 2020

Rohit Khanna (Note: /ˈkɑːnə/ KAH-nə) (born September 13, 1976) is an American politician and attorney serving as the U.S. representative from California's 17th congressional district since 2017. A member of the Democratic Party, he defeated eight-term incumbent Democratic representative Mike Honda in the 2016 general election, after first running for the same seat in 2014. Khanna also served as the deputy assistant secretary in the United States Department of Commerce under President Barack Obama from 2009 to 2011.

Khanna was born in Philadelphia to Indian parents. A self-described "progressive capitalist", Khanna has called for a "new economic patriotism" as a governing philosophy. Khanna has championed the abundance agenda. Khanna is a multimillionaire with a net worth estimated variously between $27 million and over $340 million in 2026.

Khanna endorsed Bernie Sanders for president of the United States in 2016 and co-chaired Sanders' 2020 presidential campaign. He is a member of the bipartisan Congressional YIMBY Caucus, which advocates increasing housing supply to address housing affordability challenges. He founded and co-chairs the Congressional Antitrust Caucus, and has advocated stricter antitrust scrutiny of dominant technology firms and major mergers involving the tech sector.

In 2025 and 2026 Khanna drew broader national attention through town halls in Republican-held districts and appearances in early-voting presidential states, leading several national outlets to describe him as a potential contender for the Democratic presidential nomination in the 2028 United States presidential election.

== Early life and education ==
Rohit Khanna was born in Philadelphia, Pennsylvania, on September 13, 1976, into an Indian family. His parents immigrated to the United States from the Indian state of Punjab in 1968. His father is a chemical engineer who is a graduate of the Indian Institute of Technology and of the University of Michigan, while his mother is a former schoolteacher. Khanna's maternal grandfather, Amarnath Vidyalankar, was a politician, social worker, and journalist. Born in Bhera, in the Shahpur District of British Punjab (later Punjab, Pakistan), he was part of the Indian independence movement and spent two years in jail in the pursuit of Dominion status for India.

Raised in Bucks County, Pennsylvania, Khanna has said that his parents impressed on him the obligations of being a first-generation American-born citizen. He has also said that summer visits to New Delhi helped shape his connection to his Indian heritage and that conversations with his maternal grandfather were formative. Khanna is a graduate of Council Rock High School, a public school in Newtown, in 1994. Later profile coverage described him as the valedictorian of his class. By high school, he had already developed an interest in politics; in a 2022 interview, Khanna said that his first published writing was a letter to the editor of a local Bucks County newspaper opposing U.S. involvement in the Gulf War.

He then received a Bachelor of Arts degree with honors in economics from the University of Chicago in 1998, where he was a member of Phi Beta Kappa. In a 2022 interview, Khanna said that the university's Core Curriculum and his study of political philosophy helped instill what he described as "intellectual humility" and shaped his thinking about pluralism and the American political tradition. He received a Juris Doctor (JD) from Yale Law School in 2001.

== Political, legal, and academic career ==
As a student at the University of Chicago, Khanna worked for William D. Burns walking precincts during Barack Obama's first campaign for the Illinois Senate in 1996. Khanna interned for Jack Quinn when Quinn served as the chief of staff for Vice President Al Gore. As a sophomore, he interned at former president Jimmy Carter's Carter Center.

After graduating from law school, Khanna clerked for federal appeals judge Morris S. Arnold in Little Rock, Arkansas. In private practice, he specialized in intellectual property law.

In 2009, President Barack Obama appointed Khanna deputy assistant secretary of the United States Department of Commerce. In that role, Khanna led international trade missions and worked to increase United States exports. He was later appointed to the White House Business Council.

Khanna left the Department of Commerce in August 2011 to join Wilson Sonsini Goodrich & Rosati, a law firm in Silicon Valley.

As part of a pro bono legal team, Khanna filed an amicus brief on behalf of 13 of the country's leading social scientists in the Supreme Court case Fisher v. University of Texas (2016). That brief included research on how a diverse educational environment benefits students and cited studies showing that race-conscious admissions policies (known as affirmative action) used by institutions such as the University of Texas result in a more diverse student body.

Khanna was a visiting lecturer of economics at Stanford University from 2012 to 2016, taught law at the Santa Clara University School of Law, and taught American jurisprudence at San Francisco State University. In 2012, he published a book on American competitiveness in business, Entrepreneurial Nation: Why Manufacturing is Still Key to America's Future. Governor Jerry Brown appointed Khanna to the California Workforce Investment Board in 2012. Khanna served on the board of Planned Parenthood Mar Monte from 2006 until 2013 while on leave from the Obama Administration.

In 2014, Khanna left Wilson Sonsini for his first campaign for California's 17th congressional district seat. Khanna finished second in the top-two primary behind seven-term incumbent and fellow Democrat Mike Honda. He lost a close general election to Honda, but garnered substantial support from the Silicon Valley tech industry. Khanna then took a job as vice president of strategic initiatives at Smart Utility Systems.

In 2016, Khanna challenged Honda again. Former President Carter made a rare primary endorsement supporting Khanna's Congressional campaign in 2016. He narrowly finished first in the top-two primary over Honda, then defeated him in the general election by a nearly 2-to-1 margin, with significant support from venture capital firms and tech companies. Khanna was reelected in 2018, 2020, 2022, and 2024.

As of August 2025, Khanna was working with YouTubers "Schlep" and "KreekCraft" to exercise Roblox's child safety after "Schlep" was terminated and sent a cease and desist letter for catching child predators on the site.

== U.S. House of Representatives ==
=== Elections ===
==== 2004 ====
Khanna ran one of the nation's first anti-Iraq war campaigns for the United States House of Representatives in the 2004 elections, unsuccessfully challenging Tom Lantos in the Democratic primary in California's 12th congressional district. He received endorsements from prominent officials, including Matt Gonzalez, and newspapers, including the San Mateo County Times, but lost.

California's 12th congressional district Democratic primary election, 2004
Primary election
Party	Candidate	Votes	%
Democratic	Tom Lantos (incumbent)	63,323	73.53%
Democratic	Ro Khanna	17,107	19.87%
Democratic	Maad Abu-Ghazalah	5,678	6.59%
Democratic	Norma Bureau Elias (withdrawn)	5	0.01%
Total votes		86,113	100.00%

==== 2012 ====
Khanna intended to run for the House in California's 15th congressional district in the 2012 election, hoping to succeed Democrat Pete Stark after Stark's eventual retirement, although stating he would not challenge Stark directly. He raised $1.2 million, receiving support from Governor Brown, House Minority Leader Nancy Pelosi, former Secretary of Transportation Norman Mineta, Representatives Zoe Lofgren and Anna Eshoo, and businessmen Vinod Khosla and John W. Thompson. Khanna's fundraising total for the fourth quarter of 2011 exceeded that of all but two House candidates nationwide. Eric Swalwell defeated Stark in 2012.

==== 2014 ====
United States House of Representatives elections, 2014
Primary election
Party	Candidate	Votes	%
Democratic	Mike Honda (incumbent)	43,607	48.18%
Democratic	Ro Khanna	25,384	28.05%
Republican	Vanila Singh	15,359	16.97%
Republican	Joel Van Landingham	6,154	6.80%
Total votes		90,504	100.00%
General election
Democratic	Mike Honda (incumbent)	69,561	51.75%
Democratic	Ro Khanna	64,847	48.25%
Total votes		134,408	100.00%
Democratic hold			

On April 2, 2013, Khanna announced that he would challenge Mike Honda in California's 17th congressional district in the 2014 midterm elections. He assembled a campaign team composed of top members of President Barack Obama's reelection team, including Jeremy Bird, Obama's 2012 national field director, and Steve Spinner, one of Obama's top three fundraisers. Khanna was backed by executives at Google, Facebook, Yahoo! and other tech companies, and by the editorial boards of the San Jose Mercury News, the San Francisco Chronicle, the Oakland Tribune, and the Contra Costa Times. He earned the endorsement of San Jose Mayor Chuck Reed, and also won the endorsement of the San Jose Silicon Valley Chamber of Commerce.

A lawsuit was filed before the Sacramento County Superior Court alleging that Khanna had recruited candidates with similar names to enter the race as Republicans to split the Republican vote three ways. On March 28, 2014, the Court disqualified one of the candidates and ruled that Khanna had no connection with the incident.

On November 4, 2014, incumbent congressman Honda defeated Khanna 69,561 (51.8%) votes to 64,847 (48.2%). Khanna's campaign was funded by many of the technology industry's biggest names, including Yahoo! chief executive Marissa Mayer, Facebook executive Sheryl Sandberg, Google Chairman Eric Schmidt, Napster founder Sean Parker, investor Marc Andreessen, and venture capitalist Steve Westly.

==== 2016 ====
California's 17th congressional district primary election, 2016
Primary election
Party	Candidate	Votes	%
Democratic	Ro Khanna	52,059	39.08%
Democratic	Mike Honda (incumbent)	49,823	37.40%
Republican	Peter Kuo	12,224	9.18%
Republican	Ron Cohen	10,448	7.84%
Democratic	Pierluigi C. Oliverio	5,533	4.15%
Libertarian	Kennita Watson	3,125	2.35%
Total votes		133,212	100.00%
General election
Democratic	Ro Khanna	142,262	61.01%
Democratic	Mike Honda (incumbent)	90,919	38.99%
Total votes		233,181	100.00%
Democratic hold			

In June 2015, Khanna announced his intention to run again for the House in California's 17th congressional district. He took no donations from PACs or corporations for his 2016 campaign. Khanna raised $480,500 from individuals associated with the securities and investment industry and $170,752 from individuals associated with the electronics manufacturing industry. All these donations were subject to the $2,700 individual contributions cap. On June 7, 2016, Khanna won the primary with 52,059 (39.1%) votes. Honda came in second with 49,823 (37.4%) votes. The two Democrats advanced to the general election on November 8, 2016. Khanna became the Representative-elect on November 8 after defeating Honda, 61% to 39%. According to the East Bay Times, Khanna won with a campaign platform focused on "moving the Democratic Party to a more progressive stance." He held his first town hall as a congressman on February 22, 2017, at Ohlone College.

During his successful campaign for Congress, Khanna endorsed Bernie Sanders for president of the United States in 2016.

On May 10, 2017, Khanna officially joined the Justice Democrats. He is a member of the Congressional Progressive Caucus and the Congressional Asian Pacific American Caucus.

Peter Thiel supported Khanna's candidacy in 2016. He had twice supported Khanna previously (in 2011 and 2013). Other supporters of Khanna in 2016 included Eric Schmidt, Marissa Mayer, Sheryl Sandberg and Sean Parker.

==== 2018 ====
Khanna won reelection, defeating Republican Ron Cohen in the 2018 general election, by a margin of 72.5% to 27.5%.

California's 17th congressional district election, 2018
Primary election
Party	Candidate	Votes	%
Democratic	Ro Khanna (incumbent)	72,676	61.98%
Republican	Ron Cohen	26,865	22.91%
Democratic	Khanh Tran	8,455	7.21%
Democratic	Stephen Forbes	6,259	5.34%
Libertarian	Kennita Watson	2,997	2.56%
Total votes		117,252	100.00%
General election
Democratic	Ro Khanna (incumbent)	159,105	75.35%
Republican	Ron Cohen	52,057	24.65%
Total votes		211,162	100.00%
Democratic hold			

==== 2020 ====
Khanna was reelected, defeating Republican Ritesh Tandon in the general election with 71.3% of the vote.

California's 17th congressional district, 2020
Primary election
Party	Candidate	Votes	%
Democratic	Ro Khanna (incumbent)	107,638	68.65%
Republican	Ritesh Tandon	33,527	21.38%
Democratic	Stephen Forbes	12,110	7.72%
Libertarian	Joe Dehn	3,523	2.25%
Total votes		156,798	100.00%
General election
Democratic	Ro Khanna (incumbent)	212,137	71.35%
Republican	Ritesh Tandon	85,199	28.65%
Total votes		297,336	100.00%
Democratic hold			

Khanna co-chaired the Bernie Sanders 2020 presidential campaign.

==== 2022 ====
California's 17th congressional district, 2022
Primary election
Party	Candidate	Votes	%
Democratic	Ro Khanna (incumbent)	74,892	65.96%
Republican	Ritesh Tandon	28,730	25.35%
Democratic	Stephen Forbes	5,694	5.01%
Democratic	Rao Ravul	2,394	2.11%
Libertarian	Joe Dehn	1,836	1.62%
Total votes		113,546	100.00%
General election
Democratic	Ro Khanna (incumbent)	127,853	70.93%
Republican	Ritesh Tandon	52,400	29.07%
Total votes		180,253	100.00%
Democratic hold			

==== 2024 ====
California's 17th congressional district, 2024
Primary election
Party	Candidate	Votes	%
Democratic	Ro Khanna (incumbent)	74,004	62.90%
Republican	Anita Chen	31,568	26.83%
Democratic	Ritesh Tandon	5,738	4.87%
Democratic	Mario Ramirez	4,498	3.82%
Libertarian	Joe Dehn	1,839	1.56%
Total votes		117,647	100.00%
General election
Democratic	Ro Khanna (incumbent)	172,462	67.66%
Republican	Anita Chen	82,415	32.34%
Total votes		254,877	100.00%
Democratic hold			

=== Committee assignments ===
For the 119th Congress:

- Committee on Armed Services
  - Subcommittee on Cyber, Information Technologies, and Innovation (Ranking Member)
  - Subcommittee on Seapower and Projection Forces
- Committee on Oversight and Government Reform
  - Subcommittee on Cybersecurity, Information Technology, and Government Innovation
  - Subcommittee on Economic Growth, Energy Policy, and Regulatory Affairs
- Select Committee on Strategic Competition between the United States and the Chinese Communist Party

=== Caucus memberships ===
- Climate Solutions Caucus
- NOPAC Caucus
- India Caucus
- Pakistan Caucus
- Vietnam Caucus
- Black Maternal Health Caucus
- Congressional Antitrust Caucus
- Congressional Progressive Caucus
- Medicare for All Caucus
- Congressional Blockchain Caucus
- Congressional Equality Caucus
- Congressional Caucus for the Equal Rights Amendment
- Rare Disease Caucus
- BIOTech Caucus

== Political positions ==
=== Climate change ===
As chair of the House Oversight Subcommittee on the Environment, Khanna presided over the "Big Oil hearing", bringing the CEOs of ExxonMobil, Chevron, Shell, and BP to appear before Congress under oath to investigate their spreading of disinformation about climate change. The hearing took place on October 28, 2021. As late as 2000, Exxon advertised in The New York Times that "scientists have been unable to confirm" that burning fossil fuels causes climate change. The Big Oil hearings were the first time oil executives were compelled to answer questions under oath about whether their corporations misled the public about the effects burning oil, gas, and coal have on raising the Earth's temperature and extreme weather patterns such as intensifying storms, deadlier wildfires, and worsening droughts. During the hearing, Khanna called on the executives to "Spare us the spin today. We have no interest in it... Spin doesn't work under oath." In an interview with Yahoo Finance, Khanna described the oil industry's role in obfuscating climate science: "We will have scores of evidence that these big oil companies misrepresented to the American public the threat of climate change. They cast doubt and uncertainty, even though they had scientists in their own company telling them that climate change and climate crisis was going to be catastrophic. And that they continue to engage in a pattern of deception." Khanna led the House Committee on Oversight and Reform's two-year investigation, which uncovered documents showing how Big Oil continues to mislead the public about its commitment to climate goals.

Khanna played a key role in year-long negotiations with Senator Joe Manchin to secure the $369 billion climate investment in the Inflation Reduction Act and bring House progressives and environmental groups on board.

Khanna criticized oil executives for increasing their oil production on October 28, 2021; conversely, in March 2022, he called for an increase in production after gas prices increased. In a Wall Street Journal piece, Khanna laid out a comprehensive strategy to increase production and supply in the short term to dramatically lower prices for the working class and to have a "moonshot" in renewable energy for the long run to diversify energy sources and stabilize prices. In a New York Times piece, Khanna called on President Joe Biden to do "way more" to lower gas prices by having the Strategic Petroleum Reserve buy and sell oil cheaply to stabilize prices.

Khanna called climate activist Greta Thunberg to testify in a hearing on eliminating fossil fuel subsidies and worked with executive director of Greenpeace Annie Leonard to lead the campaign to stop new fossil fuel permitting in California.

In 2018, Khanna signed on to then Representative-elect Alexandria Ocasio-Cortez's "Green New Deal" proposal, which seeks to form a climate change plan with a goal of a 100% renewable energy economy.

In March 2019, Khanna was one of 14 members of the House to cosponsor the PFAS Detection Act, legislation intended to provide $45 million (~$55.8 million in 2025) to the U.S. Geological Survey for the purpose of developing advanced technologies that can detect PFAS and afterward conduct nationwide sampling for PFAS in the environment.

In a December 2019, New York Times op-ed, Khanna and former Secretary of State John Kerry laid out a plan for how America should win the "green energy race", analogizing it to the space race. Khanna and Kerry called for expanding the electric vehicle tax credit to make it fully refundable at the time of purchase. This would mean that a person would receive money back immediately when buying an electric vehicle rather than waiting a year for a tax refund. They also called for an exponential increase in the Advanced Research Projects Agency's budget and for doubling the budgets for the Energy Department's Office of Energy Efficiency and Renewable Energy and Office of Science, which they say would support renewable energy research to foster the sort of innovation necessary to meet the scale and urgency of the climate challenge. Kerry and Khanna also called for the creation of an infrastructure bank to finance a high-speed rail system to relieve congestion, reduce pollution, increase energy efficiency, and provide alternatives to regional air travel. Finally, Khanna and Kerry called for the U.S. to match China's annual investment in public-private partnerships, noting that China spent $126 billion on renewable energy investments in 2016, while the U.S. spent just over $40 billion.

Khanna has said that creating a select committee in the House of Representatives that is specifically dedicated to a Green New Deal would be a "very commonsense idea", based on the recent example of the Select Committee on Energy Independence and Global Warming (2007–2011), which proved effective in developing a 2009 bill for cap-and-trade legislation.

=== Internet Bill of Rights ===
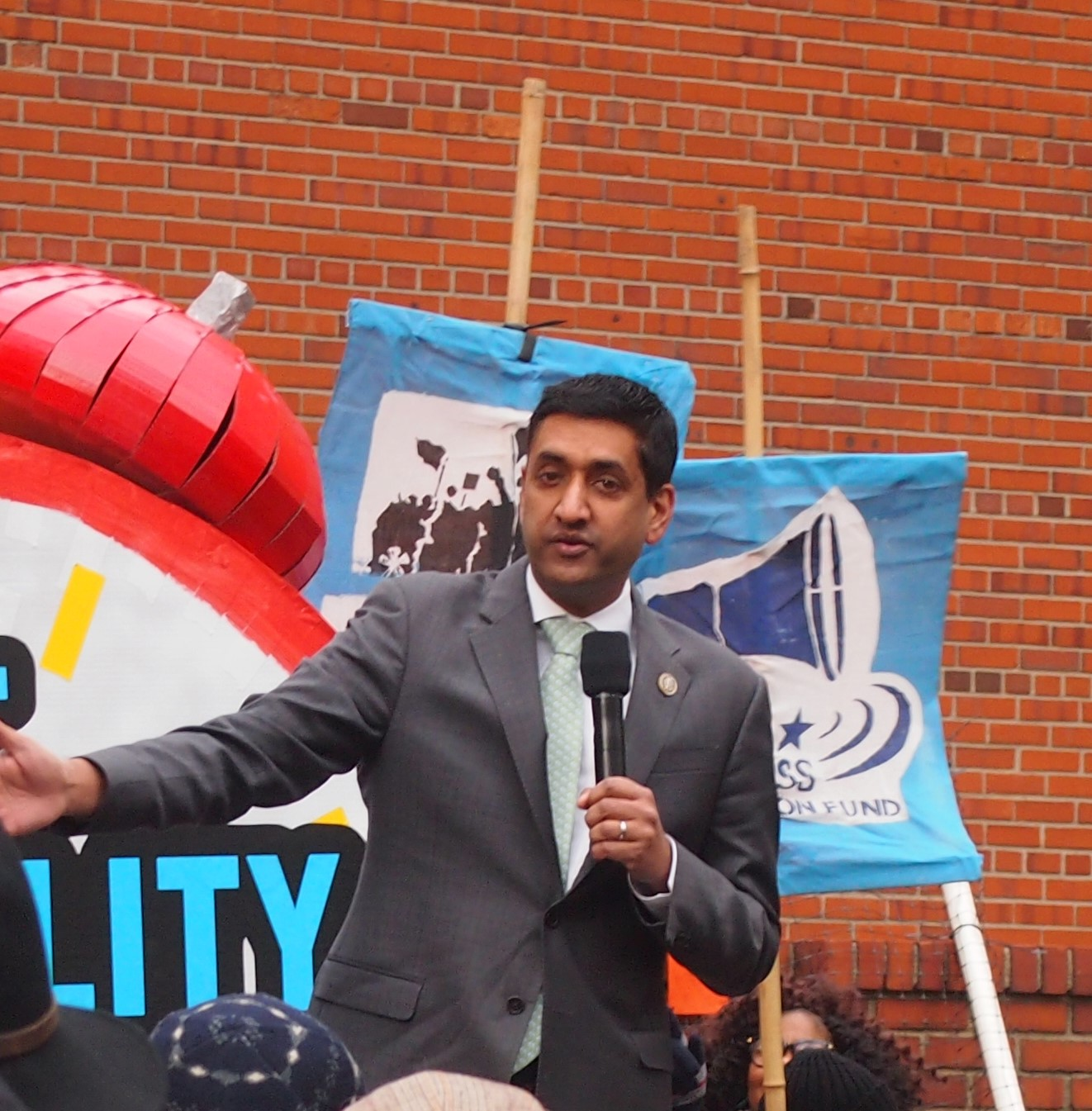
Khanna at a Net Neutrality demonstration in Washington, D.C.

In April 2018, Nancy Pelosi asked Khanna to draft the Internet Bill of Rights in wake of Cambridge Analytica's breach and Mark Zuckerberg's testimony to Congress. In October 2018, Khanna released a set of principles for an Internet Bill of Rights, including the right of U.S. citizens to have full knowledge of and control over their personal online data, the right to be notified and consent when an entity seeks to collect or sell one's personal data, and the guarantee of net neutrality.

The inventor of the World Wide Web, Tim Berners-Lee, has endorsed Khanna's principles for the Internet Bill of Rights, saying, "This bill of rights provides a set of principles that are about giving users more control of their online lives while creating a healthier internet economy."

Former Secretary of State Hillary Clinton praised the efforts to establish an Internet Bill of Rights in her keynote speech at Mansfield College, Oxford, saying, "it is past time to demand that all nations and corporations respect the right of individuals to control their own data... There is important work now being done by technologists like Tim Berners-Lee, the inventor of the World Wide Web, and Ro Khanna, the U.S. Congressman representing Silicon Valley. They are trying to develop guidelines for how this could work."

=== Technology and manufacturing jobs ===
Khanna, Senate Majority Leader Chuck Schumer, Senator Todd Young, and Representative Mike Gallagher coauthored the Endless Frontier Act, a massive increase in science funding that creates technology hubs across the nation.

The White House invited Khanna to be on stage with President Biden when he signed the Chips and Science bill. This law is based on Khanna's Endless Frontiers bill and is one of the largest investments in science and in chip manufacturing in American history.

Khanna's Valor Act passed both the House and the Senate and was signed by President Donald Trump on November 21, 2017. The legislation makes it easier for companies to offer apprenticeships to veterans.

Trump signed Khanna's second bill, the IDEA Act, into law on December 20, 2018. It requires all federal agencies to modernize their websites to the standard of the private sector.

In a New York Times op-ed, Khanna laid out his vision for bringing technology jobs to rural and small-town America. He called for additional funds to existing community colleges and land grant universities to create technology institutes, endorsed an $80 billion investment in high-speed fiber internet throughout the country, and called for federal incentives for government hiring of rural-based software development companies. Khanna also led a delegation of Silicon Valley executives to Jefferson, Iowa, where they partnered with local community colleges and Pillar Technology to create software designer jobs paying $65,000 a year.

Khanna spearheaded a joint effort with Google, community colleges, HBCUs, and HSIs to establish a public-private partnership aimed at offering financial assistance, skills training, and access to high-paying positions in the technology sector to more than 100 students. This initiative was implemented at eight colleges, in Pennsylvania, Iowa, South Carolina, Mississippi, Illinois, New York, New Hampshire, and Nevada. Each participant received a $5,000 stipend and an 18-month credential.

Khanna has argued that Silicon Valley should share its economic success with the rest of the U.S. He has also been a longtime supporter of bringing advanced manufacturing jobs across America, the topic of his book, Entrepreneurial Nation: Why Manufacturing is Still Key to America's Future.

In March 2017, Khanna traveled to Paintsville, Kentucky, also known as "Silicon Holler", with a bipartisan delegation from Congress, to lend support to TechHire Eastern Kentucky, a program that trains Kentuckians in fields such as computer technology and coding. He expressed support for a broad technology apprenticeship program that could help areas of the United States such as Appalachia by giving blue-collar workers the skills they need to launch careers in the technology sector. The press has called Khanna the "Ambassador of Silicon Valley".

In May 2017, Khanna stood up for the Appalachian Regional Commission and Manufacturing Externship Partnership, a Reagan-era policy, when Trump's proposed 2018 budget zeroed out its funding. Khanna called for quadrupling the program budget.

Khanna passed his first legislative initiative as the lead Democrat with Majority Leader Kevin McCarthy to enable veterans to use GI funding for tech training programs.

Khanna called on Silicon Valley executives and technology companies to do more nationwide to create tech jobs and diversify their recruiting efforts by making sure to recruit the next generation of tech workers from not just Ivy League institutions but also state schools and historically black colleges and universities. In a Washington Post op-ed, Khanna wrote, "Tech companies must offer an aspirational vision of how all Americans, regardless of geography, can benefit from a tech-driven economy. This means making investments not just in California, Massachusetts, and New York, but also in start-ups and entrepreneurs in cities and rural communities across the nation."

In February 2018, Khanna and Representative Tim Ryan led a tour of venture capitalists encouraging them to invest in middle America.

Khanna has been called an "unconventional ambassador" for the Democratic Party in bringing technology and innovation across America.

In 2022, Khanna was appointed to the National Security Commission on Emerging Biotechnology, a bipartisan commission charged with making policy recommendations to Congress and the Executive Branch.

=== Trade policy ===
Khanna has argued that trade policy should focus on rebuilding domestic manufacturing capacity and reducing trade imbalances in strategically important sectors. In a 2022 essay for Foreign Affairs, he wrote that trade liberalization with China after the granting of permanent normal trade relations and China's entry into the World Trade Organization accelerated U.S. deindustrialization, and called for "economic patriotism" centered on expanding domestic production, targeted tariffs, export promotion, and industrial policy.

At the same time, Khanna has criticized across-the-board tariffs as inflationary and ineffective when not paired with public investment in workforce development and production. In April 2025, he said blanket tariffs on electronics would raise prices for consumers and shift production to countries such as Malaysia and Vietnam rather than return manufacturing to the United States, adding that tariffs could be useful only as part of a broader industrial policy.

In September 2025, Khanna and Republican representative Don Bacon introduced bipartisan legislation to exempt coffee from tariffs imposed after January 19, 2025, arguing that the duties were increasing prices for American consumers on a product not produced domestically at scale.

=== Economics ===
Khanna has called on his colleagues to adopt a more progressive economic platform. He is an original co-sponsor of Senator Bernie Sanders's College For All Act, legislation aiming to make public colleges tuition-free. He also has proposed $1 trillion expansion of the earned income tax credit (EITC), financed by a financial transaction tax, to help working families across America.

In the Budget Committee, Khanna pointed out that Trump was for a single-payer healthcare system in 2000. Khanna now supports a House bill to provide "Medicare for All".

Fred Hiatt, the editor of The Washington Post editorial page, has suggested that Khanna is a thoughtful and new economic voice for the Democratic Party.

Khanna has co-sponsored the Reward Work Act of 2018, to reform U.S. labor law and corporate law by guaranteeing the right of employees in listed companies to elect one third of the board of directors.

Khanna supports the unionization of Starbucks and Maximus, and urged California lawmakers and Governor Gavin Newsom to enact AB257, which sets workplace standards covering the state fast-food industry, including wages, working hours, health and safety, and training. Khanna led Congress in writing a letter to Howard Schultz to stand up for Starbucks workers' right to unionize.

In 2025, Khanna co-sponsored the Protecting the Right to Organize Act, a proposal to expand protections for labor union organizing and strengthen enforcement of the National Labor Relations Act.

In 2025, Khanna was an original co-sponsor of the Raise the Wage Act of 2025, which would raise the federal minimum wage to $17 and phase out subminimum wages for tipped workers, youth workers, and workers with disabilities.

=== LGBT rights ===
Khanna led the legislation to implement a gender-inclusive "X" identifier on U.S. passports that served as a basis for the action on the issue by the State Department.

=== NO PAC caucus ===
In 2017, Khanna co-founded the NO PAC Caucus in the House with two other members, Beto O'Rourke and Jared Polis. Three more U.S. Representatives subsequently chose to refuse all contributions from political action committees: Phil Roe, Francis Rooney, and John Sarbanes. These members would not fill out questionnaires or pledge positions to political action committees in exchange for contributions. Khanna and O'Rourke also introduced a bill to ban PACs from contributing to members of Congress.

In December 2018, Khanna, constitutional scholar Bruce Ackerman and Senator Russ Feingold proposed a plan for "Democracy Dollars". Under the proposal, every American citizen would get $50 to spend on federal elections. Khanna has also worked with Republican Representative Mike Gallagher of Wisconsin on reform proposals.

Khanna has said he believes the Democratic Party needs to rethink its political program by running on progressive issues like free college, Medicare for all, and the removal of corporate influence and money from politics.

Khanna introduced a five-point reform ban to ban stock trading for members and spouses, to ban all PAC and lobbyist money, to have term limits for members of Congress and Supreme Court Justices, to ban Members of Congress from ever becoming lobbyists, and to have a judicial code of ethics for the Supreme Court.

=== Childcare ===
In 2024, Khanna introduced a universal childcare bill modeled after Canada's system. The legislation caps childcare costs for families making under $250,000 annually at $10 per day and mandates a minimum wage of $24 for childcare workers. The bill, with an estimated cost of $780 billion over 10 years, allows families to choose between private, public, neighborhood, or home-based childcare options. Stay-at-home parents are also supported through the program. Providers have the option to participate in the $10 a Day program and receive grant incentives. Nothing is mandatory.

=== Constituent services and office culture ===
Khanna was honored as one of two offices out of 435 for having the best workplace culture by the Congressional Management Foundation in 2023 and for best constituent services in 2019.

=== Reforming H1B abuse ===
Khanna co-sponsored H.R.1303, a bipartisan companion bill to the H-1B and L-1 Visa Reform Act of 2017 designed to prevent the exploitation of foreign workers while still recognizing the contributions immigrants make to the US economy. The bill would overhaul the H-1B and L-1 visa programs to protect American workers and crack down on the outsourcing of American jobs abroad.

=== Safety for sex workers ===
Khanna partnered with Senator Elizabeth Warren to study the impact of FOSTA/SESTA, including increased violence and sexual assault, on sex workers.

=== Monopolistic behavior ===
Khanna founded and co-chairs the Antitrust Caucus in the House. He has called for a reorientation of antitrust policy to consider the impact on jobs, wages, small business, and innovation, and for scrutiny of the Whole Foods/Amazon merger.

In 2018, along with Senator Bernie Sanders, Khanna proposed the Stop BEZOS Act, which would tax firms for every dollar that employees earn in government health care benefits or food stamps. The law would also make it illegal for any large company to investigate whether or not a potential employee receives federal assistance. Khanna's rationale for the legislation was that it would force corporations to increase salaries for workers or pay for the welfare programs their employees rely on. Economists at the Center on Budget and Policy Priorities published an analysis of the bill finding that it would hurt low-wage workers by giving corporations incentives not to hire workers that rely on federal assistance programs. Khanna challenged Amazon CEO Jeff Bezos directly, saying that if Bezos "announced that [he] would pay everyone at least a $15 minimum wage and reliable hours, [he] could set the standard." In response to Sanders's and Khanna's legislation and criticism, on October 2, 2018, Bezos announced that Amazon would raise wages of all employees to $15 an hour, effective November 2018.

Khanna wrote a letter to the inspector general of the Department of Defense requesting that he look into TransDigm Group, an aviation parts manufacturer, and supplier of companies like Boeing. In his letter, Khanna said TransDigm may be bypassing rules that protect U.S. taxpayers since the manufacturer conducts business with the Pentagon. He said he wants to make sure the TransDigm Group is not adding unnecessary costs to the U.S. taxpayer and is not contributing to the $54 billion increase in defense spending proposed by the Trump administration. TransDigm agreed to refund $16.1 million to the Defense Department.

In November 2018, Khanna and Sanders introduced the Stop WALMART Act, intended to ban large companies from buying back their own stock unless the company has a minimum hourly wage of $15 (~$19.00 in 2025) for all employees, allows employees to earn up to seven days of paid sick leave, and pays the company's CEO or highest-paid employee no more than 150 times the median pay for employees.

=== Pharmaceuticals ===
On November 20, 2018, Khanna and Sanders unveiled a bill intended to abolish monopolies on pharmaceuticals, regardless of any patents, and authorize companies to make cheaper generic versions of a drug if its price is higher than the median price in Canada, the United Kingdom, Germany, France, and Japan. Sanders said in a statement that the United States was the only country in the world that allowed "pharmaceutical companies to charge any price they want for any reason they want" and that the "greed of the prescription drug industry is literally killing Americans".

=== Foreign policy ===
A supporter of a more non-interventionist foreign policy, Khanna wrote an op-ed for the Los Angeles Times with Senator Rand Paul on June 1, 2017, making the case against military interventions when US security is not at risk. They argued that the nation is weary of perpetual war since 2001, and that calls for regime change abroad have been a mistake. In 2019, Khanna was one of eight lawmakers to sign a pledge stating their intent "to fight to reclaim Congress's constitutional authority to conduct oversight of U.S. foreign policy and independently debate whether to authorize each new use of military force" and to bring "the Forever War to a responsible and expedient conclusion" after 17 years of U.S. military conflict.

==== Afghanistan ====
In 2019, Khanna and Senator Rand Paul led a bipartisan group of lawmakers in signing a letter to Trump asserting that it is "long past time to rein in the use of force that goes beyond congressional authorization" and they hoped this would "serve as a model for ending hostilities in the future—in particular, as you and your administration seek a political solution to our involvement in Afghanistan." In a statement, Khanna said, "The president cannot pursue a foreign policy agenda without the advice and consent, let alone the support, of the Congress" and thanked Paul for helping him "in bringing an end to these wars", citing the Constitution as not being partisan.

==== Brazil ====
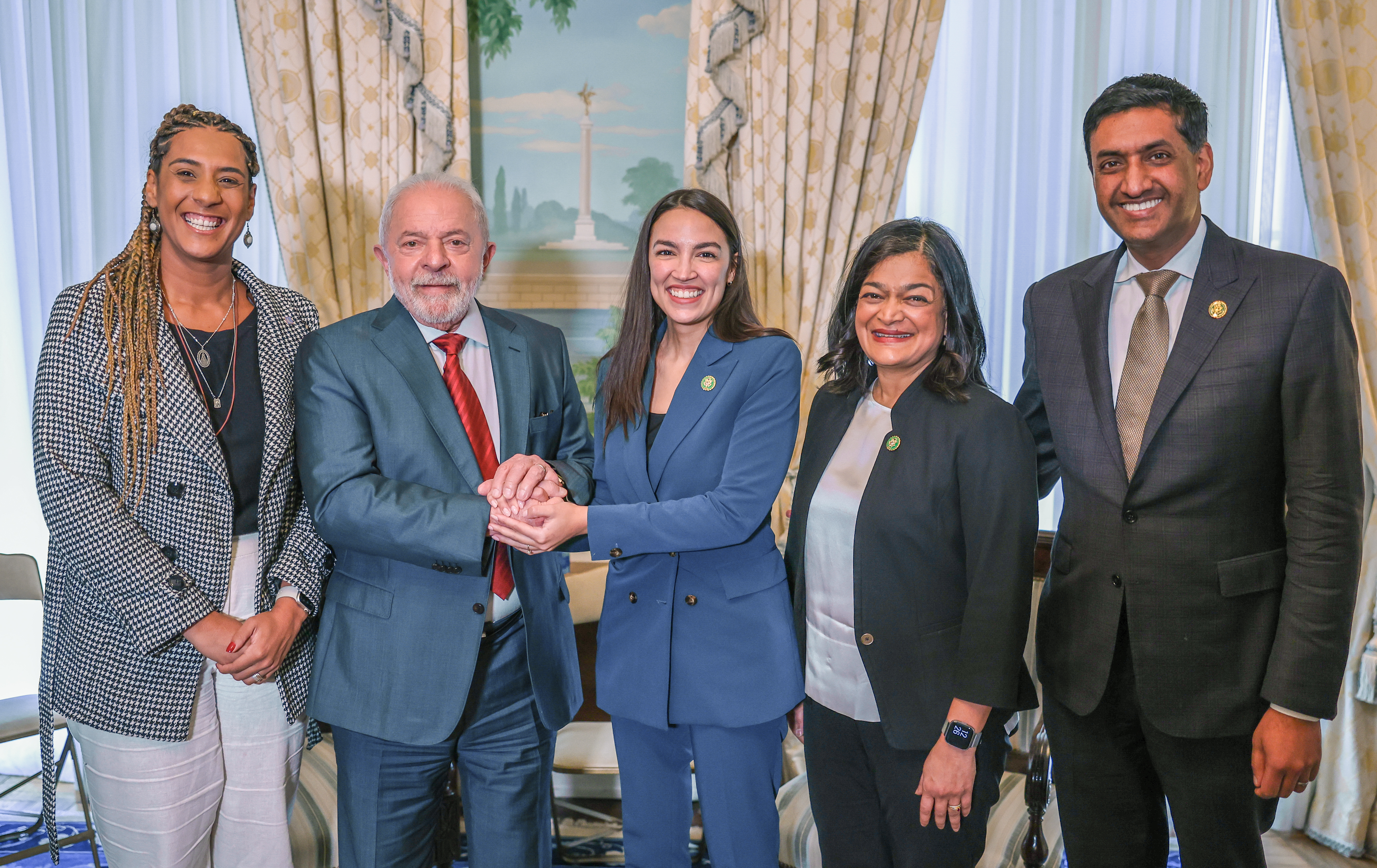
Khanna with Alexandria Ocasio-Cortez, Pramila Jayapal and Brazilian president Luiz Inácio Lula da Silva, February 2, 2023

Khanna has been critical of Brazil's former president Jair Bolsonaro, a far-right politician criticized for misogynistic, homophobic, and anti-immigrant views who has been embraced by the Trump administration as an ally and partner. In March 2019 Khanna and 29 other Democratic lawmakers wrote a letter to Secretary of State Mike Pompeo that read in part, "Since the election of far-right candidate Jair Bolsonaro as president, we have been particularly alarmed by the threat Bolsonaro's agenda poses to the LGBT community and other minority communities, women, labor activists, and political dissidents in Brazil. We are deeply concerned that, by targeting hard-won political and social rights, Bolsonaro is endangering Brazil's long-term democratic future". Khanna also asked the Trump administration to investigate the case that imprisoned former Brazilian president Luiz Inácio Lula da Silva on corruption charges, following The Intercept's exposé that showed Judge Sergio Moro plotted with prosecutors to convict Lula and prevent the Workers' Party from returning to power.

==== China ====
House Democratic Leader Hakeem Jeffries appointed Khanna to the House Select Committee on Strategic Competition between the United States and the Chinese Communist Party. Khanna is pushing for rebalancing the U.S. relationship with China on trade and shoring manufacturing. He is also the ranking member on the House Armed Services Subcommittee for Cybersecurity, Innovation Technology, and Information Systems. In September 2025, Khanna visited China as part of a bipartisan delegation, where he met Premier Li Qiang, Foreign Minister Wang Yi, Defense Minister Dong Jun and other high-ranking Chinese officials. Khanna has called for the United States to not view China as an existential adversary but as a competitor to be managed, and said that he had discussed "the importance of peaceful coexistence" with Wang. On 5 January 2026, he replaced Raja Krishnamoorthi as the ranking Democratic member of the House China Committee.

==== Israeli–Palestinian conflict ====
In December 2017, Khanna criticized Trump's decision to recognize Jerusalem as the capital of Israel, saying, "The United States and Israel share similar values of peace, democracy, and entrepreneurship. We should always look for ways to strengthen the relationship and address Israel's legitimate security concerns. The President's decision to move the U.S. embassy to Jerusalem, however, is misguided and does not advance peace."

During the Gaza war, Khanna called for a permanent ceasefire in Gaza and said Congress should more closely scrutinize U.S. arms transfers to Israel. In March 2024, after reports that the Biden administration had approved more than 100 foreign military sales to Israel since the war began, he called for hearings in the House Armed Services Committee on the legal basis for the transfers and whether they complied with the administration's human rights policy.

In June 2024, Khanna said he would not attend Israeli prime minister Benjamin Netanyahu's address to Congress, saying he did not want to sit through a "one-way lecture"; he was among the more than 60 Democrats who boycotted the speech the following month.

On July 31, 2025, Jewish Insider reported that Khanna, along with fellow progressives in the U.S. House, was circulating a letter advocating for a two-state solution in the Middle East. The proposed framework would condition recognition of a Palestinian state on full recognition of Israel and the disarmament of Hamas, and came amid renewed international discussion of Palestinian statehood ahead of a United Nations meeting in September.

In September 2025, Khanna led 47 House colleagues in a letter urging President Donald Trump and Secretary of State Marco Rubio to have the United States formally recognize a Palestinian state. Reporting at the time linked the House effort to a Senate proposal calling for recognition of a demilitarized Palestinian state based on pre-1967 borders and governed by the Palestinian Authority.

In November 2025, Khanna was one of 20 Democratic members of Congress who cosponsored a resolution introduced by Representative Rashida Tlaib to officially recognize Israel's conduct in the Israel-Hamas war as a genocide.

In January 2026, Khanna and Senator Peter Welch led 74 lawmakers in urging the Trump administration to oppose Israeli annexation efforts in the West Bank and to preserve the possibility of a negotiated two-state solution. That June, he received the endorsement of Track AIPAC after signing its PEACE pledge.

===== Detention in Khirbet Zanuta =====
In July 2026, Khanna was detained at gunpoint by Israeli settlers for over an hour during a visit to Khirbet Zanuta, a depopulated Palestinian village in the West Bank. Journalist Jasper Nathaniel had invited Khanna to visit the West Bank and connected his group with local Palestinian residents.

An IDF military source told The Jerusalem Post that they immediately dispersed the settlers who "unlawfully detained and harassed Khanna and his group". Khanna responded to an inquiry by The Jerusalem Post saying, "The Israeli government is lying to cover up for four IDF soldiers who aided violent settlers brandishing M4 guns and threatening American lives. I am calling for their arrest and prosecution." Khanna also told NBC News that one of the soldiers told his translator that they are "on the side of the settlers", and that the IDF further detained him after their arrival. The incident was documented on social media by Cameron Kasky, Khanna's aide.

An editorial in Haaretz covering the incident was published with the title "Ro Khanna Got the VIP Version of What West Bank Palestinians Face Every Day". The editorial stated, "Had he been a Palestinian, or even an Israeli human rights activist, the situation would have looked very different. His car might have been smashed to pieces, or blood might even have been shed." Israeli Ambassador to the US Yechiel Leiter accused Khanna of performing a "staged provocation". He told CBS News that Khanna's visit to the West Bank was a "political stunt" meant to distract from domestic issues.

==== Iran ====
In 2025, Khanna and Representative Thomas Massie backed a bipartisan War Powers Resolution effort aimed at requiring congressional authorization before U.S. involvement in hostilities with Iran.

In February 2026, after U.S. strikes on Iran, Khanna and Representative Thomas Massie again pressed a bipartisan War Powers Resolution aimed at requiring congressional authorization for further hostilities. The House rejected the measure in March 2026. Khanna has made statements in support of the Islamabad Memorandum to end the conflict, arguing that Democrats who were against starting the war should also support efforts to end the war.

==== North Korea ====
Khanna worked with former president Jimmy Carter, who had agreed to travel to North Korea to meet with Kim Jong Un; in 1994, Carter met with Kim's grandfather, Kim Il Sung.

On January 18, 2018, Khanna organized a group of 33 House members to sign a letter urging Trump to reestablish military-to-military communications with North Korea. He also called for two other steps that should be taken to alleviate tension with the DPRK. He reintroduced a bill explicitly stating that the president of the United States should not be allowed to launch a nuclear strike without congressional approval, and called upon Trump to send a bipartisan team to negotiate directly with the North Koreans.

In February 2019, Khanna introduced a resolution to end the Korean War while leaving American troops in Korea that urged the Trump administration to give "a clear roadmap for achieving a permanent peace regime and the peaceful denuclearization of the Korean peninsula." In a statement, Khanna said diplomacy between North and South Korea had "created a once-in-a-generation opportunity to formally end this war" and advocated that Trump "work hand in hand with our ally, South Korean President Moon Jae-in, to bring the war to a close and advance toward the denuclearization of the peninsula."

==== Syria ====
Khanna has been critical of the strikes on Syria. On December 22, 2018, Khanna laid out the progressive case for withdrawal of military forces from Syria and Afghanistan, noting that Congress never authorized the involvement of U.S. troops in the Syrian civil war.

In 2023, Khanna was among 56 Democrats to vote in favor of H.Con.Res. 21, which directed President Joe Biden to remove U.S. troops from Syria within 180 days.

==== Yemen ====
On November 13, 2017, the House of Representatives passed a resolution condemning civilian deaths, starvation and the spread of disease in Yemen, admitting that much of the responsibility for that humanitarian crisis rests with the U.S. because of its support for a Saudi-led military intervention, and noting that the war has allowed al Qaeda, ISIL, and other groups to thrive. Khanna, along with Representative Jim McGovern, co-sponsored the resolution on the House floor. The resolution passed with a bipartisan majority of 366–30.

On September 27, 2017, Khanna and Representatives Thomas Massie, Mark Pocan, and Walter B. Jones Jr. submitted a bipartisan bill on the floor of the House that would halt U.S. military assistance to the Saudi-led campaign in Yemen on the grounds that Congress never approved the American role in the war. In a joint statement with Pocan, Khanna said, "we aim to restore Congress as the constitutionally mandated branch of government that may declare war and retain oversight over it." In an op-ed for The New York Times detailing the human cost of the continued war in Yemen, Khanna, Pocan, and Jones wrote, "We believe that the American people, if presented with the facts of this conflict, will oppose the use of their tax dollars to bomb and starve civilians in order to further the Saudi monarchy's regional goals."

In November 2018, after American and Saudi officials announced that the Trump administration had halted its inflight refueling support for the Saudi-led coalition aircraft engaged in Yemen, Khanna called the decision "a major victory" while asserting the need for Congress to pass a resolution ensuring all American involvement was ended. In February 2019, the House Foreign Affairs Committee advanced a bill ending American support for the Saudi intervention in Yemen. Khanna noted that more than "14 million Yemenis—half the country—are on the brink of famine, and at least 85,000 children have already died from hunger and disease as a result of the war" and called on Congress to "end American complicity in the atrocities in Yemen." On February 13, after the House voted to withdraw support for the Saudis in Yemen, Khanna called the day "historic" and said he was "encouraged by the direction people are pushing our party to take on foreign policy, promoting restraint and human rights and with the sense they want Congress to play a much larger role."

=== Civil rights ===
Khanna led efforts in the House to make the standard for the use of force only as a last resort. This was adopted in the George Floyd Justice in Policing Act, which passed the House. Khanna has also been a vocal advocate of abolishing the filibuster and passing voting rights legislation, as when, in 2021, a Senate battle over a proposed voter rights bill was under discussion.

=== Combating antisemitism ===
Khanna led a bipartisan resolution to tackle antisemitism on college campuses that provides funding for education about the Holocaust, ongoing antisemitism, and World War II.

On April 25, 2018, 57 members of the House of Representatives, led by Khanna, released a condemnation of Holocaust distortion in Ukraine and Poland. They criticized Poland's new Holocaust law and Ukraine's 2015 memory laws glorifying Ukrainian Insurgent Army (UPA) and its leaders, such as Roman Shukhevych. The condemnation came in an open bipartisan letter to Deputy Secretary of State John J. Sullivan. Andrzej Pawluszek, an adviser to Polish prime minister Mateusz Morawiecki, called the claims in Congress's letter "irresponsible and shocking". The Association of Jewish Organizations and Communities of Ukraine (Vaad of Ukraine) also rebuked the letter, calling it "anti-Ukrainian defamation" like that used by Russian propaganda during the war in Ukraine.

=== Rejecting Hindutva ===
Varghese K. George of The Hindu called Khanna "an unequivocal and strong supporter of a pluralist America, and India-U.S. ties," who "for the same reason rejects Hindutva and its exclusive nationalism." In a statement targeted at Tulsi Gabbard, Khanna said, "it is the duty of every American politician of Hindu faith to stand for pluralism, reject Hindutva, and speak for equal rights for Hindus, Muslims, Sikhs, Buddhists, and Christians", a statement that was criticized in a letter published by the Hindu American Foundation (HAF) and signed by what was described as "a record number of 230 Indian-American organisations in the U.S.", who also objected to Khanna's membership in the Congressional Caucus on Pakistan.

In 2026, Khanna signed a pledge to reject donations from the Rashtriya Swayamsevak Sangh and affiliated Hindu nationalist groups.

=== Biden administration ===
As of October 2021, Khanna had voted in line with Joe Biden's stated position 100% of the time.

Khanna remained an ally of Biden during the 2024 presidential campaign and served as a campaign surrogate. After Biden's poor performance in the June 2024 presidential debate, Khanna publicly defended Biden's decision to remain in the race, said that Democrats should unite behind the nominee, and argued that the decision whether to continue belonged to Biden himself. Biden withdrew from the race on July 21, 2024, after weeks of pressure from fellow Democrats following the debate.

=== Abortion ===
Khanna opposed the overturning of Roe v. Wade, calling it "heartbreaking". He said the decision "strips Americans of their basic freedom and endangers the health and safety of millions. It strips women of the right to make their own decisions about their bodies and their futures", especially low-income women, women of color, and women living in rural areas.

=== Supreme Court ===
Khanna has led a bill to limit the terms of Supreme Court justices. In 2022, he called the Court's recent conservative decisions anti-egalitarian and anti-democratic.

=== Free speech ===
Khanna is an advocate of free speech. In 2022, the publication of the Twitter Files highlighted his efforts to stop the former Twitter administration from censoring the New York Post's reporting on the Hunter Biden laptop controversy.

=== Roblox child safety ===
In August 2025, Khanna advocated for transparency regarding Roblox's safety issues. He has opened up a website where people can sign up and help contribute to this cause.

=== Epstein Files Transparency Act ===
In late 2025, Khanna partnered with Representative Thomas Massie (R-KY) to pass the Epstein Files Transparency Act, which was signed into law by President Trump on November 19, 2025, and led to the subsequent release of millions of documents. The legislation has been characterized as the most significant Democratic legislative achievement of the Trump term and noted for splitting the MAGA base, while serving as a critical step for justice for survivors.

Following the rollout of these documents, in February 2026, Khanna used his time on the U.S. House floor to publicly read the names of six individuals that he stated had been redacted from the Department of Justice's files. Khanna and Massie, who reviewed the unredacted documents, criticized the DOJ for withholding the names without clear justification, while noting that inclusion in the files does not itself imply criminal wrongdoing. The names Khanna read into the Congressional Record included Leslie Wexner and Sultan Ahmed bin Sulayem.

Khanna stated, "Now my question is: why did it take Thomas Massie and me going to the Justice Department to get these six men's identities to become public? And if we found six men that they were hiding in two hours, imagine how many men they are covering up for in those three million files."

According to The Guardian, "the Department of Justice said that four of the men Khanna named have no apparent connection to Epstein whatsoever, but rather appeared in a photo lineup assembled by the southern district of New York (SDNY)."

== Personal life ==
Khanna resides in Fremont, California, with his wife Ritu Khanna (née Ahuja), a fellow Indian American, and their two children, Zara and Soren. Khanna and Ahuja married in Cleveland in August 2015. At the time of their marriage, Ritu Khanna had worked in marketing for the Italian jewelry company Bulgari. Ritu's father is Monte Ahuja, who in 1975 founded Transtar, an automotive transmission parts supply company in Solon, Ohio. The Monte Ahuja College of Business is named after Ahuja.

As of 2016, Khanna was a vice president for strategic initiatives at Smart Utility Systems, an energy efficiency company with an office in Santa Clara. Smart Utility Systems produces software for water conservation and for reducing electricity consumption.

Upon entering Congress in 2017, Khanna had a minimum net worth of $27 million, the fourth richest member of Congress, due to his wife's holdings. By 2025, Khanna had a median net worth of $232 million. Khanna's family made 4,284 stock trades with a volume of over $59 million in 2025. It was reported in 2026 that his net worth was over $340 million.

Khanna is a practicing Hindu who has described his faith as "Gandhian Hinduism". In a 2019 op-ed, he wrote that summer visits to his grandparents in New Delhi shaped his connection to his Indian heritage and that his family's values were deeply influenced by his grandfather's Gandhian worldview.

In 2025, the newsletter Chaotic Era reported that Khanna made 53 appearances on podcasts and YouTube shows between January and September of that year.

== Electoral history ==
Electoral history of Ro Khanna
Year	Office		Party	Primary			General			Result	Swing	Ref.
Year	Office		Party	Total	%	P.	Total	%	P.	Result	Swing	Ref.
2004	U.S. House	12th	Democratic	17,107	19.87	2nd				Lost	Hold	
2014	U.S. House	17th	Democratic	25,384	28.05	2nd	64,847	48.25	2nd	Lost	Hold	
2016	U.S. House	17th	Democratic	52,059	39.08	1st	142,262	61.01	1st	Won	Hold	
2018	U.S. House	17th	Democratic	72,676	61.98	1st	159,105	75.35	1st	Won	Hold	
2020	U.S. House	17th	Democratic	107,638	68.65	1st	212,137	71.35	1st	Won	Hold	
2022	U.S. House	17th	Democratic	74,892	65.96	1st	127,853	70.93	1st	Won	Hold	
2024	U.S. House	17th	Democratic	74,004	62.90	1st	172,462	67.66	1st	Won	Hold	
2026	U.S. House	17th	Democratic	83,051	62.30	1st	TBD					
Source: Secretary of State of California | Statewide Election Results

== Works ==
- Khanna, Ro (2012). Entrepreneurial Nation: Why Manufacturing is Still Key to America's Future. McGraw Hill Professional. ISBN 9780071802000.
- Khanna, Ro (2022). Dignity in a Digital Age: Making Tech Work for All of US. Simon & Schuster. ISBN 978-1982163341.
- Khanna, Ro (2022). Progressive Capitalism: How to Make Tech Work for All of Us. Simon & Schuster. ISBN 9781982163365.

== See also ==
- Congressional Asian Pacific American Caucus
- List of Asian Americans and Pacific Islands Americans in the United States Congress
- List of United States representatives from California
- List of politicians of Indian descent § United States
- Politics of California

== Notes ==
U.S. House of Representatives
Preceded by Mike Honda	Member of the U.S. House of Representatives from California's 17th congressional district 2017–present	Incumbent
U.S. order of precedence (ceremonial)
Preceded by Mike Johnson	United States representatives by seniority 170th	Succeeded by Raja Krishnamoorthi
