= Stephen Macedo =

American academic

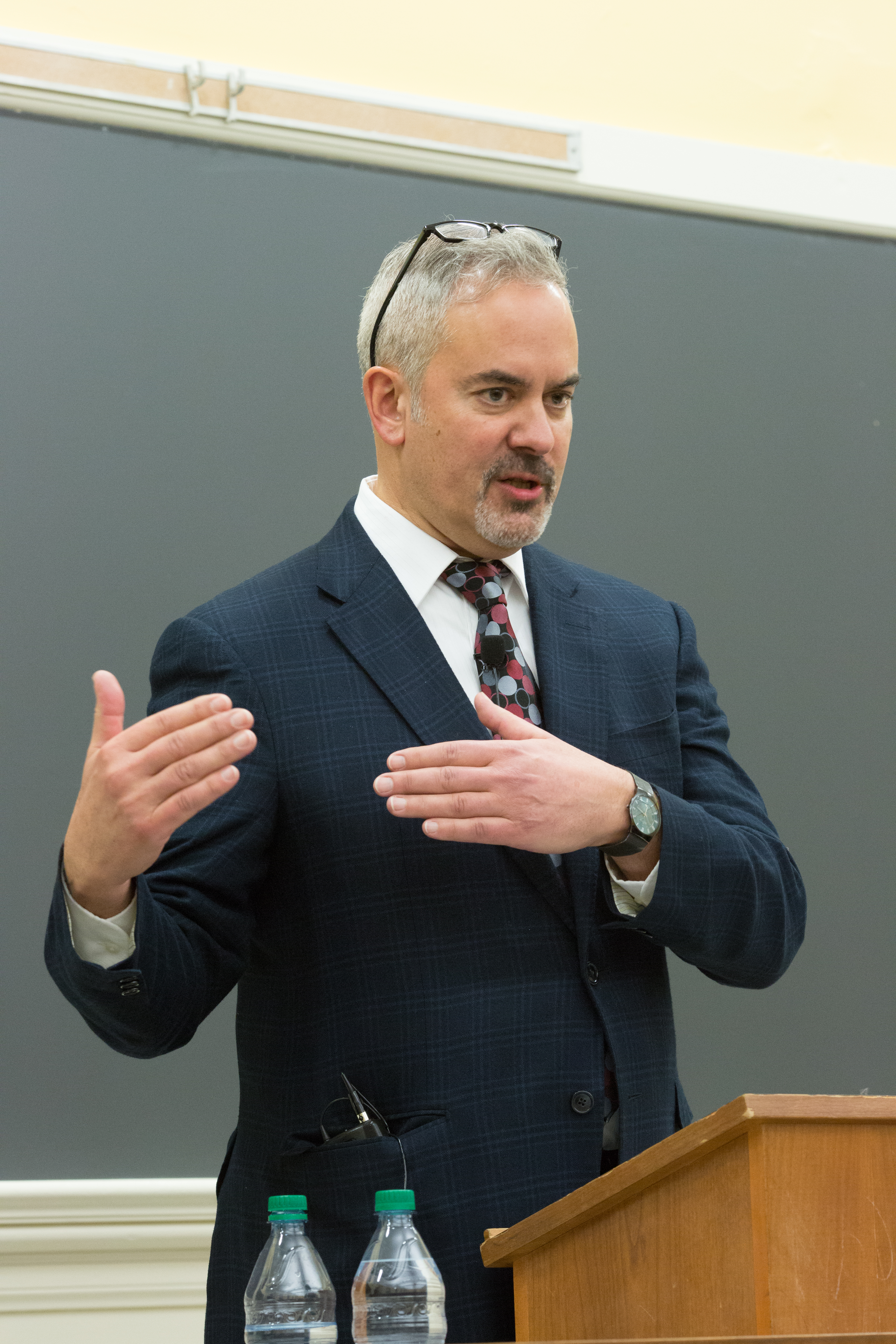
- Macedo in 2016
- Born: August 1, 1957 (age 69)
- Title: Laurance S. Rockefeller Professor of Politics

Academic background
- Education: College of William & Mary (BA); London School of Economics (MSc); Princeton University (MA, PhD); Balliol College, Oxford (MLitt)

Academic work
- Discipline: Political science
- Institutions: Harvard University; Syracuse University; Princeton University
- Website: Official website

Stephen Macedo (born in August 1957) is an American political scientist who serves as the Laurance S. Rockefeller Professor of Politics at Princeton University, where he was the former director at the University Center for Human Values. Macedo served as the president of the American Society for Political and Legal Philosophy from 2018 until 2021.

== Education ==
Macedo matriculated at the College of William & Mary, earning a Bachelor of Arts, magna cum laude, in 1979 with Phi Beta Kappa membership. Afterwards, he obtained a Master of Science at the London School of Economics in 1980 and a Master of Arts in politics from Princeton University in 1984. In 1985, Macedo earned a Master of Letters at Balliol College, Oxford, where was an early member of the Oxford Hayek Society. Afterwards, he returned to Princeton to earn a PhD in politics.

== Academic career ==
Macedo began his teaching career with the Harvard University Government Department. Next, he held the Michael O. Sawyer chair at the Maxwell School of Citizenship and Public Affairs of Syracuse University, before taking the position he currently holds at Princeton University.

He writes and teaches on political theory, ethics, American constitutionalism, and public policy, with an emphasis on liberalism, justice, and the roles of schools, civil society, and public policy in promoting citizenship. He served as founding director of Princeton's Program in Law and Public Affairs (1999–2001). He recently served as vice president of the American Political Science Association and chair of its first standing committee on Civic Education and Engagement, and in this capacity he is principal co-author of Democracy at Risk: Public Policy and the Renewal of American Citizenship.

== Awards and honors ==
In 2014, Macedo was elected to the American Academy of Arts and Sciences.

== Selected bibliography ==
=== Books ===
- Macedo, Stephen (1991). Liberal virtues: citizenship, virtue, and community in liberal constitutionalism. Oxford New York: Clarendon Press Oxford University Press. ISBN 9780198278726.
- Macedo, Stephen (2000). Diversity and distrust: civic education in a multicultural democracy. Cambridge, Massachusetts: Harvard University Press. ISBN 9780674011236.
- Macedo, Stephen; Young, Iris Marion (2003). Child, family, and state. New York: New York University Press. ISBN 9780814756829. (Conference proceedings)
- Macedo, Stephen; Wolf, Patrick J. (2004). Educating citizens international perspectives on civic values and school choice. Washington, D.C.: Brookings Institution Press. ISBN 9780815795179.
- Macedo, Stephen (2006). Universal jurisdiction: National courts and the prosecution of serious crimes under international law. Philadelphia: University of Pennsylvania Press. ISBN 9780812219500.
- Macedo, Stephen; Murphy, Walter F.; Fleming, James E.; Barber, Sotirios A. (2014). American constitutional interpretation (5th ed.). St. Paul, Minnesota: Foundation Press. ISBN 9781609301422.
- Macedo, Stephen; Lee, Frances (2025). In Covid's Wake: How Our Politics Failed Us. Princeton University Press. ISBN 0691267138.
