= Sizing Up the Senate =

1999 book by Frances E. Lee and Bruce I. Oppenheimer

Sizing Up the Senate: The Unequal Consequences of Equal Representation
- Author: Frances E. Lee, Bruce I. Oppenheimer
- Language: English
- Genre: Non-fiction
- Publisher: University of Chicago Press
- Publication date: 1999
- Publication place: United States
- ISBN: 0-226-47006-7

Sizing Up the Senate: The Unequal Consequences of Equal Representation, by Frances E. Lee and Bruce I. Oppenheimer, is a 1999 book that analyzes the behavior of US senators based on the size of the states that they represent.

It demonstrates that small-state senators are much more likely to engage in pork barrel politics than large-state senators and are much more likely to have leadership positions. Sizing Up the Senate also empirically demonstrates that small states receive more money per capita from the federal government by the spending formula for block grants.

It is a political science book, but its first chapter deals with the history of the creation of the Senate and argues that the Senate was created not by federalist theory but out of the refusal of small states to go along with the US Constitution unless they were granted equal representation in one body of the national legislature. Upon publication, it was awarded the D.B. Hardeman Prize for the best book on Congress. Since 1999, the book has grown in popularity and is well known among congressional scholars, having been cited over 250 times in contemporary political science.

== Reviews ==
The book received reviews in publications including the American Political Science Review, Political Science Quarterly, and The American Prospect.

== Contemporary applications ==
Since 2018, the authors' findings have been applied to a variety of issue topics in the mainstream media. CNN cited the book in an article concerning smaller states' influence of appointees to the Supreme Court of the United States. The Washington Post also used its findings in article addressing civility across the country.

== See also ==
- Connecticut Compromise
- History of the United States Senate
- How Democratic Is the American Constitution? (2001), by Robert A. Dahl
- Reform of the Senate

== Publication data ==
Sizing Up the Senate: The Unequal Consequences of Equal Representation (1999). Frances E. Lee and Bruce I. Oppenheimer, University of Chicago Press, ISBN 0-226-47006-7
