= Securities Investor Protection Corporation =

American financial non-profit

- Abbreviation: S.I.P.C.
- Formation: 1970
- Tax ID no.: 52-0910763
- Legal status: 501(c)(6) membership corporation
- Headquarters: 1667 K Street NW, Suite 1000, Washington, D.C. 20006, United States
- President & CEO: Michael L. Post
- General Counsel & Secretary: Marsha C. Massey
- Vice President - Operations: Karen L. Saperstein
- Revenue: $335,525,137 (2017)
- Expenses: $67,218,040 (2017)
- Employees: 39 (2017)
- Website: http://www.sipc.org/

The Securities Investor Protection Corporation (SIPC) is a non-profit, member-funded, United States government corporation created under the Securities Investor Protection Act (SIPA) of 1970 that most US-registered broker-dealers are required to join. Although created by federal legislation and overseen by the Securities and Exchange Commission, the SIPC is neither a government agency nor a regulator of broker-dealers. The purpose of the SIPC is to expedite the recovery and return of missing customer cash and assets during the liquidation of a failed investment firm.

== Board of Directors ==
The SIPC has a Board of Directors which determines the policies that govern the operations of the SIPC. The board consists of seven members. All members serve for terms of three years. Two members of the board are appointed by the Secretary of the Treasury and the Federal Reserve Board from among the officers and employees of the Department of the Treasury and from among the officers and employees of the Federal Reserve Board, respectively. The remaining five members are appointed by the President, by and with the advice and consent of the Senate. Of these five members, three shall be selected from among persons who are associated with, and representative of different aspects of, the securities industry, not all of whom shall be from the same geographical area of the United States. The other two members shall be selected from the general public from among persons who are not associated with a broker or dealer or associated with a member of a national securities exchange, or similarly associated with any self-regulatory organization or other securities industry group, and who have not had any such association during the two years preceding appointment.

A director may serve after the expiration of their term until their successor has taken office.

The President designates a chairman and vice chairman from among those directors selected from the general public.

=== Board members ===
The current members of the board, as of May 18, 2026:

Position	Name	State	Group	Confirmed	Term expires
Chair	Claudia Slacik	New York	The general public	February 3, 2022	December 31, 2026
Vice chair	Glen S. Fukushima	California	The general public	April 6, 2022	December 31, 2024
Director	William S. Jasien	Virginia	The securities industry	July 23, 2007	December 31, 2009
Director	William J. Brodsky	Illinois	The securities industry	May 18, 2022	December 31, 2026
Director	Alan Patricof	New York	The securities industry	December 20, 2022	December 31, 2025
Director	W. Moses Kim	—	Department of the Treasury	—	—
Director	Elizabeth K. Kiser	—	Federal Reserve Board	—	—

== History ==
=== Enactment ===
In response to the near collapse of the financial markets in 1970, Congress chose to enact legislation that could prevent an escalation of brokerage firm insolvencies and help stabilize the financial markets. In December 1970, Senator Edmund Muskie pushed forward a bill to create a Federal Broker Dealer Insurance Corporation. A compromise with the House resulted in the SIPA, which President Richard Nixon signed into law at the end of the month. Excerpts from the President's statement made clear the goals of the legislation:

I AM SIGNING today the Securities Investor Protection Act of 1970. This legislation establishes the Securities Investor Protection Corporation (SIPC), a private nonprofit corporation, which will insure the securities and cash left with brokerage firms by investors against loss from financial difficulties or failure of such firms. ... I urged the formation of a corporation to afford protection to small investors. ... Just as the Federal Deposit Insurance Corporation protects the user of banking services from the danger of bank failure, so will the Securities Investor Protection Corporation protect the user of investment services from the danger of brokerage firm failure. This act protects the customer, not the broker, since only the customer is paid in the event of firm failure. It does not cover the equity risk that is always present in stock market investment, but it will assure the investor that the solvency of the individual firm with which he deals will not be cause for concern. It protects the small investor, not the large investor, since there is a limit on reimbursable losses. And it assures that the widow, the retired couple, the small investor who have invested their life savings in securities will not suffer loss because of an operating failure in the mechanisms of the marketplace.

=== The Paperwork Crunch and financial crisis ===
The SIPC was born in the shadow of the "Paperwork Crunch" of 1968–70 as a means to restore confidence in the U.S. securities market. During this period,

An explosion in the volume of trading had occurred. A system designed to handle an average three million share trading day was incapable of dealing with the thirteen million share trading day common in the late 1960s. The resultant breakdown in the securities processing mechanism caused chaos as the number of errors in recording transactions multiplied. ... In December 1968, member firms of the New York Stock Exchange had $4.4 billion in "fails to deliver" and $4.7 billion in "fails to receive." Brokers and dealers were finding it difficult, if not impossible, to ascertain their own financial condition. ... This operational and financial crisis forced more than one hundred brokerage firms into liquidation causing thousands of customers to be seriously disadvantaged.

In response, the Securities Investor Protection Act of 1970 was enacted as a way to quell investor insecurity and save the securities market from a financial crisis. In his introduction of the Securities Investor Protection Act to the floor of the Senate, Senator Edmund Muskie stated:

The economic function of the securities markets is to channel individual institutional savings to private industry and thereby contribute to the growth of capital investment. Without strong capital markets it would be difficult for our national economy to sustain continued growth. ... Securities brokers support the proper functioning of these markets by maintaining a constant flow of debt and equity instruments. The continued financial wellbeing of the economy thus depends, in part, on public willingness to entrust assets to the securities industry.

== Functions ==
The SIPC serves two primary roles in the event that a broker-dealer fails. First, the SIPC acts to organize the distribution of customer cash and securities to investors. SIPC protects against the loss of cash and securities held by a customer at a financially troubled SIPC-member brokerage firm, up to $500,000 per customer, including a $250,000 limit for cash. In most cases where a brokerage firm has failed or is on the brink of failure, SIPC first seeks to transfer customer accounts to another brokerage firm. Should that process fail, the insolvent firm will be liquidated. In order to state a claim, the investor is required to show that their economic loss arose because of the insolvency of their broker-dealer and not because of fraud, misrepresentation, or bad investment decisions. In certain circumstances, securities or cash may not exist in full based upon a customer's statement. In this case, protection is also extended to investors whose "securities may have been lost, improperly hypothecated, misappropriated, never purchased, or even stolen".

While customers' cash and most types of securities - such as notes, stocks, bonds and certificates of deposit - are protected, other items such as commodity or futures contracts are not covered. Investment contracts, certificates of interest, participations in profit-sharing agreements, and oil, gas, or mineral royalties or leases are not covered unless registered with the Securities and Exchange Commission.

== Coverage ==
=== Limits ===
The SIPC may be liable from its fund for up to $500,000 in asset value per customer, of which up to $250,000 may be for investment cash. These limits apply after the SIPC has pursued recovery from the broker/dealer's liquidation estate or other related parties, although it can make advances for customers facing hardship, as it did in the Madoff case.

If an investor has multiple accounts at a failing brokerage, the $500,000 limit is not strictly applied per account, instead, the notion of "capacity" is used by the SIPC, and the $500,000 (or $250,000) limit is applied per capacity. Multiple accounts are aggregated into capacities. The list of capacities is:

- Individual account
- Joint account
- Corporate account
- Trust created under state law
- IRAs
- Roth IRAs
- Executor of an estate
- Guardian of a ward

For example, if an investor had two Roth IRAS of $400,000 each, and an individual (non-IRA) account with $500,000, the two Roth IRAs would be considered a single "capacity" and the $800,000 sum would only be covered to the $500,000 limit (so $300,000 would be lost). The individual account is a distinct capacity and would be covered for its full $500,000 value.

=== Recovery in kind ===
Although modeled loosely on the Federal Deposit Insurance Corporation (FDIC) which protects bank customers, the SIPC has wider discretion in satisfying customer claims. When securities are missing, it can arrange to provide either replacement securities of the same kind, or their cash value on the date that its trustee was appointed to the case. The SIPC does not protect investors against any loss in the value of their securities, nor does it assume responsibility for any promises about investment performance. Unregistered securities, annuities and commodity contracts are not covered by the SIPC, even when brokered by a member firm. Account disputes with a brokerage that remains in business are not handled by the SIPC, but typically by the Financial Industry Regulatory Authority (FINRA) and the Commodity Futures Trading Commission (CFTC).

Inasmuch as SIPC does not insure the underlying value of the financial asset it protects, investors bear the risk of the market. In addition, investors also bear any losses of account value that exceed the current amount of SIPC protection, namely $500,000 for securities. For example, if an investor buys 100 shares of XYZ company from a brokerage firm and the firm declares bankruptcy or merges with another, the 100 shares of XYZ still belong to the investor and should be recoverable. However, if the value of XYZ declines, SIPC does not insure the difference. In other words, the $500,000 limit is to protect against broker malfeasance, not poor investment decisions and changes in the market value of securities. In addition, SIPC may protect investors against unauthorized trades in their account, while the failure to execute a trade is not covered. Again, this only pertains to an insolvent broker or dealer.

=== SIPC application in unusual situations ===
The limitations of SIPC protection caused significant confusion among a number of investors following the collapse of Bear Stearns and Lehman Brothers and perhaps, most prominently, following the exposure of Bernard Madoff's and Allen Stanford's and the Stanford Financial Group's ponzi scheme frauds.

In the Madoff fraud, where securities had allegedly not actually been purchased, SIPC and the SIPC Trustee challenged and disposed of the claims of approximately one-half of customers of the Madoff firm, arguing that over the course of time those investors had withdrawn more funds than had been invested, resulting in a negative "net equity", and, therefore, not eligible for SIPC protection.

If the brokerage becomes insolvent, there are some situations where the investors assets may be recovered beyond the $500,000 insurance limit, for example, if the investor's specific assets can be identified and recovered. Under rules of the regulatory SRO governing brokers and dealers—the Financial Industry Regulatory Authority (FINRA), the investors' and the brokerage firms' assets must be segregated; they may not be commingled. It could be a civil or criminal violation if an investor's assets were inappropriately commingled. If the firm files for bankruptcy, provided the assets have been appropriately segregated, the investor's assets may be recoverable beyond SIPC's protection limit if the assets are recoverable.

== Lawsuit ==
A civil lawsuit was filed on October 11, 2023 in The District of Columbia Federal District Court (Case 1:23-cv-02994) alleging improper, irresponsible and unethical behavior on the part of certain employees, officers and directors of SIPC during the creation and development of SIPC’s recently implemented broker-dealer portal. The suit contends that flawed design and inappropriate implementation within the project gave rise to conflicts of interest, suspected vendor fraud, and possible violations of the Securities Investor Protection Act of 1970. On January 27, 2025, the Court dismissed all claims against all defendants on the merits, and ordered the suit dismissed in its entirety.

== See also ==
- Financial Industry Regulatory Authority (FINRA)
- Municipal Securities Rulemaking Board (MSRB)
- Portfolio insurance
- Recovery of funds from the Madoff investment scandal
- Canadian Investor Protection Fund (Canadian counterpart)
