= Legislative Studies Quarterly =

- Discipline: Political science
- Language: English
- Edited by: Michelle Taylor-Robinson, Thad Kousser, Frances E. Lee

Publication details
- History: 1976-present
- Publisher: Wiley-Blackwell on behalf of the Department of Political Science at Washington University in St. Louis (United States)
- Frequency: Quarterly
- Impact factor: 1.655 (2018)

Standard abbreviations
- ISO 4: Legis. Stud. Q.

Indexing
- ISSN: 0362-9805 (print); 1939-9162 (web)
- LCCN: 76644733
- JSTOR: 03629805
- OCLC no.: 243419269

Links
- Journal homepage; Online access; Online archive; Ingentaconnect archive

Legislative Studies Quarterly is a quarterly peer-reviewed academic journal published by Wiley-Blackwell and is the official journal of the Legislative Studies Section of the American Political Science Association. The journal was established in 1976 and the current Co-Editors are Tiffany Barnes, Justin Kirkland, Jason M. Roberts, Jonathan Slapin, Sarah Treul. The executive editor is Brian Crisp (Washington University in St. Louis). The journal publishes articles on legislative systems, processes, and behavior, including parliaments and legislatures, their relations to other political institutions, their functions in the political system, and the activities of their members both within the institution and outside.

According to the Journal Citation Reports, the journal has a 2015 impact factor of 0.810, ranking it 80th out of 163 journals in the category "Political Science". In 2020, the impact factor has raised to 2.159 (Clarivate Analytics), ranking it 82nd out of 183 in the category of "Political Science".

== See also ==
- List of political science journals
