= Twitter Files =

Content moderation files published since 2022

The Twitter Files
- Description: Internal Twitter documents released by Elon Musk
- Date: December 2022 – March 2023
- Publishers: Matt Taibbi, Bari Weiss, Lee Fang, Michael Shellenberger, David Zweig

The Twitter Files are a series of releases of select internal Twitter, Inc. documents published from December 2022 through March 2023 on Twitter. CEO Elon Musk gave the documents to journalists Matt Taibbi, Bari Weiss, Lee Fang, and authors Michael Shellenberger, David Zweig, Alex Berenson, and Paul D. Thacker shortly after he acquired Twitter on October 27, 2022. Taibbi and Weiss coordinated the publication of the documents with Musk, releasing details of the files as a series of Twitter threads.

After the first set of files was published, various technology and media journalists said that the reported evidence demonstrated little more than Twitter's policy team struggling with difficult decisions, but resolving such matters swiftly. Some conservatives said that the documents demonstrated what they called Twitter's liberal bias.

A major aspect of the examination surrounded false assertions by Musk and others that Twitter had been ordered by the government to help presidential candidate Joe Biden in the coming election by suppressing an October 2020 New York Post story about Hunter Biden's laptop. Author and Podcaster Matt Taibbi found no evidence of government involvement in Twitter's decision to initially withhold the story.

In a June 2023 court filing, Twitter attorneys strongly denied that the Files showed the government had coerced the company to censor content, as Musk and many Republicans claimed. Former Twitter employees asserted that Republican officials also made takedown requests so often that Twitter had to keep a database tracking them.

Internal Twitter emails showed the company allowed accounts operated by the U.S. military to run a Middle East influence campaign; some accounts were kept on the platform for years before being taken down.

The releases prompted debate over the nature of blacklisting, vows for congressional investigation, calls for the full release of all documents for the sake of transparency, and calls to improve content moderation processes at Twitter.

== Background ==
The inner workings of Twitter's content moderation systems were not well known to the public, on the basis that knowledge of the details could enable manipulation. But American conservatives had long contended that Twitter used its moderation policies to muzzle conservative views. On November 28, 2022, a month after Musk officially acquired Twitter, Musk announced that he planned to release a portion of Twitter's internal documents related to "free speech suppression", adding, "The public deserves to know what really happened" under Twitter's prior leadership.

Musk subsequently gave a series of internal Twitter documents—including screenshots, emails, and chat logs—to freelance journalists Matt Taibbi and Bari Weiss. Taibbi noted that "in exchange for the opportunity to cover a unique and explosive story, I had to agree to certain conditions" that he did not disclose. Weiss stated that the only condition she and her reporting team agreed to was that the material would be first published on Twitter. Musk later stated he had not read the documents before their release to Taibbi and Weiss.

On December 6, Musk fired James Baker, deputy general counsel at Twitter, for allegedly vetting the information before it was passed on to Taibbi and Weiss and providing an explanation that Musk found "unconvincing." Taibbi said that the planned publication of Twitter's internal documents related to its handling of the Hunter Biden laptop story had been delayed because of Baker's vetting. Baker had previously been general counsel for the FBI and investigated Russian interference into the 2016 election.

== Topics ==
In his prelude, Taibbi stated that the files told a "Frankenstein tale of a human-built mechanism"—"one of the world's largest and most influential social media platforms"—"grown out [of] the control of its designer". Taibbi wrote that these documents, as well as the assessment of "multiple current and former high-level executives", demonstrate how, although external requests for moderation from both political parties were received and honored, an overwhelmingly left-wing employee base at Twitter facilitated a left-leaning bias.

The first installment included content related to Twitter's moderation process regarding a New York Post article on the Hunter Biden laptop story. The second installment addressed what Musk and others have described as the shadow banning of some users. The third installment highlighted events within Twitter leading to President Donald Trump's suspension from Twitter. The fourth installment covered how Twitter employees reacted to the January 6 United States Capitol attack and the conflict within Twitter on how to moderate tweets and users supporting the attack. The fifth installment covered how Twitter employees influenced the decision to ban Trump from the platform. The sixth installment described how the FBI contacted Twitter to suggest that action be taken against several accounts for allegedly spreading election disinformation. The seventh installment showed Twitter's interaction with the intelligence community around the New York Post story on Hunter Biden's laptop. The eighth installment showed the Twitter Site Integrity Team whitelisted accounts from United States Central Command (CENTCOM) used to run online influence campaigns in other countries.

=== No. 1: Content moderation of New York Post story ===
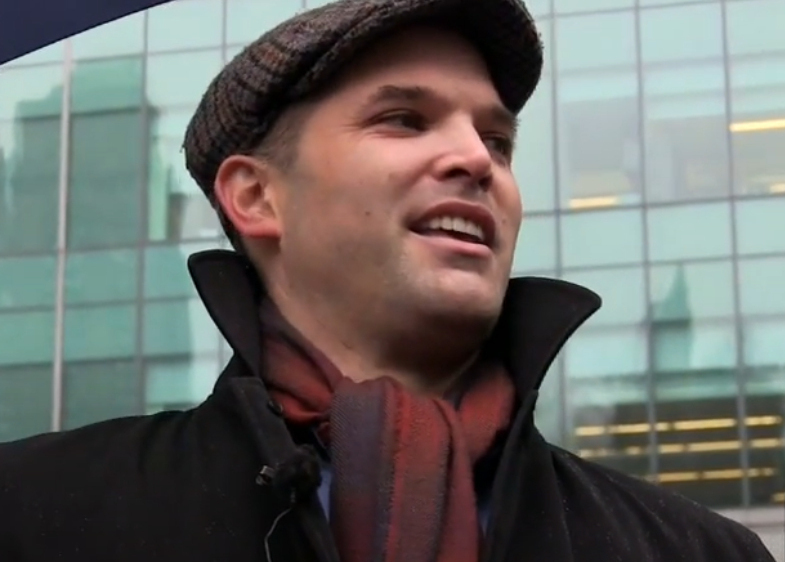
Journalist Matt Taibbi, who published the first installment of the documents

On December 2, 2022, Taibbi posted a lengthy Twitter thread reporting on the first installment of the Twitter Files, which he illustrated with images of some of the files. Taibbi's installment attracted thousands of retweets. Some documents described Twitter's internal deliberations regarding the decision to moderate content relating to the Hunter Biden laptop controversy, while others contained information on how Twitter treated tweets that were flagged for removal at the request of the 2020 Biden campaign team and the first Trump White House. He also shared communications between California Democrat Ro Khanna and then-Twitter head of legal Vijaya Gadde, in which Khanna warned about the free-speech implications and possible political backlash that would result from censorship.

The laptop controversy related to a 2020 New York Post article that presented allegations concerning a laptop computer of Hunter Biden, son of then-presidential candidate Joe Biden. Twitter, along with Facebook, implemented measures to block its users from sharing links to the story, and Twitter further imposed a temporary lock on the accounts of the New York Post and White House Press Secretary Kayleigh McEnany, citing violations of its rules against posting hacked content. The Washington Post reported that this was a result of the company's scenario-planning exercises to combat disinformation campaigns, which included potential "hack and leak" situations like what had transpired during the Russian interference in the 2016 United States elections. The decision generated an outcry from then-President Trump and conservatives who saw it as politically motivated. Yoel Roth, then Twitter's Head of Trust and Safety, later said he had not been in favor of withholding the story and acknowledged that it was a "mistake" to censor it.

The installment shed light on an internal debate on whether Twitter should prevent the story from being shared, with leadership arguing that it fell under the company's prohibition on hacked materials. According to Taibbi, then-CEO Dorsey was unaware of the decision to suppress the content when it was made. Days later, Dorsey reversed the decision, calling it a "mistake", and Twitter updated its hacked materials policy to state that news stories about hacked materials would be permitted, but with a contextual warning. Taibbi also shared a screenshot of what appeared to be a request from the Biden campaign asking for a review of five tweets, along with the Twitter moderation team's reply, "Handled these." Taibbi did not disclose the content of those tweets, but four were later found from internet archives to contain nude images of Hunter Biden, which violated Twitter policy and California law as revenge porn; the content of the fifth deleted tweet is unknown.

Musk tweeted that Twitter had acted "under orders from the government", though Taibbi reported that he found no evidence of government involvement in the laptop story, tweeting, "Although several sources recalled hearing about a 'general' warning from federal law enforcement that summer about possible foreign hacks, there's no evidence—that I've seen—of any government involvement in the laptop story." His reporting seemed to undermine a key narrative promoted by Musk and Republicans that the FBI pressured social media companies to suppress the Hunter Biden laptop stories.

=== No. 2: Visibility filtering ===
Weiss published the second installment on December 8, covering "visibility filtering." Twitter "rank[s]" tweets and search results, promoting some tweets for "timely relevance" and limiting the exposure of others. The company uses the term "visibility filtering" to refer to these practices as well as user-generated filtering—such as when one user blocks or mutes another account. One goal of visibility filtering is to reduce the reach of accounts that violate Twitter rules without committing violations egregious enough to warrant suspension.

Weiss contended that "visibility filtering" was merely Twitter's in-house term for "shadow banning". She posted screenshots of employee views of user accounts with tags indicating visibility filtering, and wrote that politically sensitive decisions were made by the Site Integrity Policy, Policy Escalation Support (SIP-PES) team, which included the chief legal officer, head of trust and safety, and CEO. She posted screenshots of the accounts of Stanford professor Jay Bhattacharya (an opponent of COVID-19 lockdowns), conservative radio host Dan Bongino, and conservative activist Charlie Kirk, which were respectively tagged with "Trends Blacklist", "Search Blacklist", and "Do Not Amplify". She also said that the SIP-PES team was responsible for the multiple suspensions of the anti-LGBT account Libs of TikTok, which had been tagged with "Do Not Take Action on User Without Consulting With SIP-PES". She noted that Twitter had not taken down a tweet containing the address of the account's owner, Chaya Raichik.

Weiss characterized these practices as censorship and as evidence of shadow banning, which Twitter disputed, largely on the basis of its different definition of "shadow ban". Twitter distinguished visibility filtering from shadow banning, which it defined as making "content undiscoverable to everyone except the person who posted it."

The documents Weiss discussed focused on individuals popular with the right-wing and suggested the moderation practices were politically motivated—a long-standing claim among American conservatives, which Twitter has denied. An internal study Twitter conducted in 2018 found its algorithms favored the political right. Wired and Slate described the policy by which moderators were unable to act on high-profile conservative accounts without first escalating to high-level management as "preferential treatment", since this effectively limited Twitter's enforcement of their content policies on these accounts. Weiss did not reveal how many accounts overall were de-amplified nor the politics of those who were, and this lack of context made it difficult to glean any conclusions on the matter. Kayvon Beykpour, the former head of product at Twitter, called the installment "deliberately misleading"; in the interest of transparency, Dorsey called for all of the Twitter Files to be released, tweeting to Musk, "Make everything public now."

=== Nos. 3–5: Attack on the Capitol and suspension of Donald Trump ===
The third installment was published by Taibbi on December 9, highlighting the events within the company that led up to Trump's suspension from Twitter. Two days after the January 6, 2021, United States Capitol attack, Trump made two tweets: one praised his voters, calling them "American Patriots" who will "not be disrespected or treated unfairly in any way, shape or form!!!" and the other stated that he would not be attending Joe Biden's inauguration. Twitter permanently suspended Trump's account on the same day, citing the two tweets as a violation of the "glorification of violence" policy. Taibbi reported that on October 8, 2020, Twitter executives created a channel entitled "us2020_xfn_enforcement" as a hub to discuss content removal that pertained to the then-upcoming 2020 United States presidential election. Twitter's moderation process was, according to Taibbi, based on guesswork, "gut calls", and Google searches, including moderation of then-President Trump's tweets. As previously reported by The New York Times in 2020, Taibbi said that then-head of Trust and Safety for Twitter, Yoel Roth, met regularly with agencies such as the FBI to discuss potential attempts by foreign and domestic actors to manipulate the 2020 election. Following the suspension of Trump's Twitter account, Taibbi reported that it set a precedent for the suspension of future presidents' accounts, which he claimed to violate Twitter's own policies. Taibbi wrote that he was told that the Trump administration and Republicans had made requests to moderate tweets but did not find any evidence of these requests in the election enforcement Slack chat.

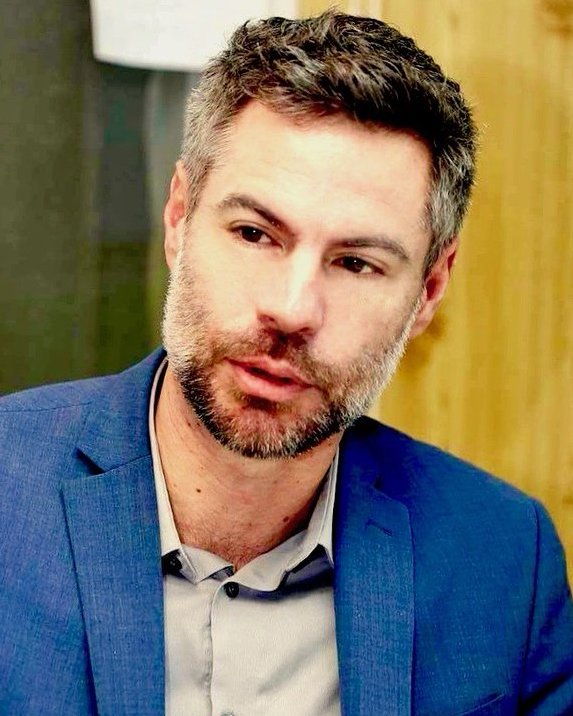
Author Michael Shellenberger, who published the fourth and seventh installments

The fourth installment was published on December 10 by Shellenberger. It covered how Twitter employees reacted to the January 6 United States Capitol attack and the conflict within the company about how to take action against tweets and Twitter users who were supporting the attack without a specific policy as backing, due to the unprecedented nature of Trump's false claims of winning the 2020 United States presidential election. Shellenberger shared screenshots of Roth asking a coworker to blacklist the terms "stopthesteal" and "kraken", both of which were associated with supporters of the January 6 attack. He also said that pressure from the company's employees appeared to influence Dorsey to approve a "repeat offender" policy for permanent suspension. After receiving five strikes as per the new policy, Trump's personal Twitter account was permanently suspended on January 8. Shellenberger's installment also provided screenshots suggesting that there were instances when employees flagged tweets and applied strikes at their own discretion without specific policy guidance, which according to Shellenberger, are examples of a frequent occurrence.

The fifth installment was published on December 12 by Weiss. It covered the conflict between Twitter employees and how it influenced the decision regarding Trump's ban from the platform. Those communications include requests from the FBI and other agencies to determine if a particular tweet violated policies against election manipulation. Weiss reported that two tweets Trump made on the morning of January 8, 2021, were used as a foundation for his suspension. She said that the two tweets were initially cleared as having no indication of incitement of violence, to the agreement of multiple employees. According to Weiss, former head of Legal, Policy, and Trust Vijaya Gadde dissented, suggesting that the tweets were dog whistles for future political violence. Weiss reported that Twitter's "scaled enforcement" team engaged and agreed with Gadde, suggesting that the tweets violated the "glorification of violence" policy and that the term "American Patriots" Trump used in a tweet was code for the Capitol rioters. She also said that one team member referred to Trump as a "leader of a terrorist group responsible for violence/deaths comparable to the Christchurch shooter or Hitler". Weiss reported that after a 30-minute all-staffer meeting, Dorsey asked Roth to simplify the language of the document for Trump's suspension. One hour later, Trump's account was suspended "due to the risk of further incitement of violence".

=== Nos. 6–7: FBI communications with Twitter Trust and Safety Team ===
The sixth installment, published by Taibbi on December 16, described how the FBI reported several accounts to Twitter's Trust and Safety Team for allegedly spreading election misinformation. According to Taibbi, many of the accounts reported had small numbers of followers and were making tweets seemingly satirical in nature, such as user Claire Foster who had tweeted "I'm a ballot counter in my state. If you're not wearing a mask, I'm not counting your vote. #safetyfirst" and "For every negative comment on this post I'm adding another vote for the democrats". He also reported that Twitter did not always take action against tweets and accounts flagged by the FBI. Taibbi wrote that a high-ranking staff member referred to the company's relationship with the FBI as "government-industry sync" due to the frequency of emails and meetings with the agency.

The seventh installment was published by Shellenberger on December 19, 2022. It described the FBI's involvement in moderating the Hunter Biden laptop story. Shellenberger reported that the FBI's and the DHS' warnings about potential foreign interference in the 2020 presidential election influenced Twitter to moderate the Hunter Biden laptop story. Roth wrote in an internal discussion about the Post story that due to "the SEVERE risks here and lessons of 2016", Twitter should apply a warning to the story and prevent it from "being amplified". Shellenberger shared screenshots of an email from 2021, which included a communication from Twitter's Safety, Content, & Law Enforcement (SCALE) team that Twitter had received $3,415,323 from a 2019 program designed to meet the "statutory right of reimbursement" for the cost of processing requests from the FBI. Musk claimed in a tweet that this payment is proof of the U.S. government bribing the company "to censor info from the public", despite such payments being commonplace for processing legal requests. Twitter's guidelines under law enforcement state that "Twitter may seek reimbursement for costs associated with information produced pursuant to legal process and as permitted by law (e.g., under 18 U.S.C. §2706)". Alex Stamos, former chief security officer at Facebook and partner at cyber consulting firm Krebs Stamos Group, wrote that the reimbursements from the FBI have "absolutely nothing to do with content moderation".

=== Nos. 8–9: Relationship with the U.S. government ===
The eighth installment by Lee Fang on December 20, 2022, reported documents that showed the Twitter Site Integrity Team whitelisted accounts from United States Central Command (CENTCOM) used to run online influence campaigns in other countries, including Yemen, Syria, and Kuwait. This whitelisting prevented the accounts from being flagged. Many of the accounts did not disclose their affiliation with the military, and instead posed as ordinary users.

The ninth tranche of "Twitter Files" by Taibbi relates to the CIA and FBI's alleged involvement in Twitter content moderation.

=== No. 10: Moderation of COVID-19 content ===
The tenth installment was published on December 26, 2022, by David Zweig, which alleges that the U.S. government was involved in moderating COVID-19 content on Twitter.

=== No. 15: Hamilton 68 Dashboard ===
On January 27, 2023, Taibbi published the fifteenth installment, which discusses the Hamilton 68 Dashboard maintained by the Alliance for Securing Democracy (ASD). Taibbi wrote, "News outlets for years cited Watts and Hamilton 68 when claiming Russian bots were 'amplifying an endless parade of social media causes – against strikes in Syria, in support of Fox host Laura Ingraham, the campaigns of both Donald Trump and Bernie Sanders."

The ASD pushed back against Taibbi's claims by publishing a fact sheet "repeating its methodology in the Hamilton 68 project" and by fact-checking Taibbi's "major allegations in that day's 'Twitter Files'". The ASD described how the media often failed to "include the appropriate context when using the dashboard's data".

Jackson Sinnenberg of The National Desk critiqued Taibbi's release, describing Taibbi's allegations and the response of the Alliance for Securing Democracy. Taibbi called ASD's work a "mix of digital McCarthyism and fraud [that] did great damage to American politics and culture". Sinnenberg noted that in 2018 the ASD had already explained how, contrary to media reports, they did not track bots. He describes how neither Twitter, Taibbi, or most media outlets "noted the specific disclaimers...at the end of the methodology guide". He sums up by noting that although Hamilton 68 was "an imperfect tool...calling it McCarthyism or fraudulent seems hyperbolic on Taibbi's part".

=== No. 16: Insults directed to and from Donald Trump and other Republicans ===
Republican politicians also lobbied Twitter to moderate or not moderate certain content to benefit their political interests. Twitter removed "go back to where you came from" from its anti-immigrant hate speech policy after a 2019 Donald Trump tweet used a similar phrase to insult (mainly U.S.-born) Democratic congresswomen. The White House asked Twitter to remove a tweet by TV personality Chrissy Teigen that insulted President Trump, but Twitter declined to do so.

=== No. 17: Global Engagement Center ===
On March 2, 2023, Taibbi published seventeenth installment, "New Knowledge, the Global Engagement Center, and State-Sponsored Blacklists" which focused on the Global Engagement Center established by the Countering Foreign Propaganda and Disinformation Act as an inter-agency effort to combat foreign propaganda.

=== No. 19: The Virality Project ===
The nineteenth installment of the Twitter Files, published March 17, 2023, dealt with how, according to Reason magazine, Stanford University's "Virality Project", in cooperation with several nonprofits, "worked with social media platforms to flag and suppress commentary on COVID vaccines, science, and policy that contradicted public health officials' stances, even when that commentary was true." The object was to police alleged COVID misinformation that included true information being misused to favor misinformation tropes: "While individual true stories about negative vaccine side effects were not treated as misinformation or disinformation, they could be labeled 'malinformation' if they exaggerated or misled people, said researchers." Other examples of flagged posts included criticism of vaccine passports, and discussion of breakthrough infections. ZDNet tech reporter Dan Patterson wrote: "At the beginning of the vaccine, there was a lot of misinformation about how these vaccines worked, and what they were trying to do is find out what's real, and then make sure that false information doesn't get accidentally amplified."

== Reactions ==
=== Congressional committee investigations ===
Republican House members Jim Jordan and James Comer launched complementary investigations in January 2023. Former Twitter employees and members of the Twitter Files team provided testimony. Both committees concluded their investigations in 2024.

=== Politicians ===
In a Fox News interview, Republican House Minority Leader Kevin McCarthy defended Taibbi's reporting and said of Elon Musk that his critics are "trying to discredit a person for telling the truth."

Democratic House Representative Ro Khanna confirmed the authenticity of his email to Twitter criticizing the suppression of the New York Post's story as a violation of First Amendment principles. He also said that Twitter should implement "clear and public criteria" of removal or non-promotion of content, make such decisions in a transparent way, and give users a way to appeal the decisions. House Republicans have stated their intention to investigate the exchange between Khanna and Twitter.

Donald Trump referred to the first release of Twitter Files as proof of "Big Tech companies, the DNC, & the Democrat Party" rigging the 2020 United States presidential election against him, declaring that "the termination of all rules, regulations, and articles, even those found in the Constitution" was necessary. He asked whether the "rightful winner" should be declared or a new election should be held. White House Deputy Press Secretary Andrew Bates condemned Trump's comments, writing that the U.S. Constitution is a "sacrosanct document" that unites the country "regardless of party" and that calling for its termination is an attack against "the soul of our nation". Musk tweeted, "The Constitution is greater than any President. End of story."

=== FBI ===
On December 21, 2022, the FBI responded to accusations made against them in the Twitter Files, releasing the following statement:

The correspondence between the FBI and Twitter show nothing more than examples of our traditional, longstanding and ongoing federal government and private sector engagements, which involve numerous companies over multiple sectors and industries. As evidenced in the correspondence, the FBI provides critical information to the private sector in an effort to allow them to protect themselves and their customers. The men and women of the FBI work every day to protect the American public. It is unfortunate that conspiracy theorists and others are feeding the American public misinformation with the sole purpose of attempting to discredit the agency.

An FBI agent at the center of the controversy stated in sworn testimony that the bureau did not give a directive to Twitter about the Hunter Biden laptop story. A former agent who helped lead the bureau's work with social media companies said, "We would never go to a company to say you need to squelch this story."

=== Legal scholars ===
Musk claimed that Twitter's content moderation violated the First Amendment. Some legal experts refuted the idea that content moderation by a private company violates the First Amendment, as it only restricts government actors. David Loy, legal director for the First Amendment Coalition, said that Twitter is legally able to choose what speech is allowed on their site, noting that both the Biden campaign, which was not part of the government, and the Trump White House could request specific content moderation actions.

Other experts disagreed, with a former Deputy Attorney General of Ohio opining that "the government can't enlist a private citizen or corporation to undertake what the Constitution precludes it from doing."

Evidence from Twitter and other social media platforms was reviewed by courts during 2023 in Murthy v. Missouri (originally Missouri v. Biden). The federal district court and United States Court of Appeals for the Fifth Circuit validated concerns raised in the investigation by ruling that several federal government agencies, including the White House, had likely violated First Amendment protections by using "intimidating messages and threats of adverse consequences" to coerce social media platforms into suppressing content. The original injunction was reduced on appeal, though the appeal court expanded the agencies involved.

The Supreme Court of the United States reversed the injunction in 2024 on procedural grounds that the plaintiffs lacked standing. However, dissent authored by Justice Samuel Alito and joined by Justices Clarence Thomas and Neil Gorsuch argued that the record demonstrated the federal government had used "unconstitutional coercion" to control social media that was "[...] more subtle than the ham-handed censorship found to be unconstitutional in Vullo, but it was no less coercive."

=== Privacy and security ===
Taibbi was criticized for not redacting email addresses from published screenshots; Yoel Roth, Twitter's former head of Trust and Safety, called it "fundamentally unacceptable", and Musk conceded that the email addresses should have been redacted. Though Musk was supportive of Roth while he was employed by Twitter, after his resignation he began publicly criticizing him and endorsing tweets making false accusations. This included an accusation that he was sexualizing children, which Donie O'Sullivan of CNN said is a "common trope used by conspiracy theorists to attack people online". Roth subsequently faced a wave of threats of violence serious enough for him to flee his home.

Musk directed his new head of Trust and Safety, Ella Irwin, to give screenshots of internal views of users' accounts to Weiss, which she posted online. The publication of the screenshots, and a statement by Musk that writers working on the files would have unfettered access, raised concerns that people could access sensitive user data in violation of a 2022 privacy agreement between Twitter and the Federal Trade Commission.

On December 10, 2022, Musk threatened to sue any Twitter employee who leaked information to the press, despite his claims to be a "free speech absolutist," and having released internal messages and emails to selected journalists. This threat was expressed in an all-hands, with Twitter employees given a pledge to sign indicating that they understood.

The Federal Trade Commission had conducted an investigation into the information released as part of the Twitter Files in late 2022, and ruled in February 2024 that no data privacy violations had occurred as Twitter engineers had "[taken] appropriate measures to protect consumers’ private information".

=== Former Twitter CEO ===
Twitter's former CEO and co-founder Jack Dorsey urged Musk to release all the internal documents "without filter" at once, including all of Twitter's discussions around current and future actions on content moderation. Dorsey later criticized Musk for only allowing the internal documents to be accessed by select people, suggesting that the files should have been made publicly available "Wikileaks-style" so that there were "many more eyes and interpretations to consider". Dorsey conceded that "mistakes were made" at Twitter but stated his belief that there was "no ill intent or hidden agendas" in the company. He also condemned the harassment campaigns waged against former Twitter employees, saying that it is "dangerous" and "doesn't solve anything".

=== Journalists ===
After the first set of Files was published, an assortment of technology and media journalists said that the reported evidence demonstrated little more than Twitter's policy team struggling with difficult decisions, but resolving such matters swiftly; while conservative journalists characterized the documents as confirmation of Twitter's liberal bias. Former Twitter employees and Trump White House officials confirmed that Republicans also made takedown requests so often that Twitter had to keep a database of them.

Forbes reported on Taibbi's posts regarding the New York Post story that "Twitter staff took 'extraordinary steps' to suppress an October 2020 New York Post story" and appeared to indicate "no government involvement in the laptop story," contradicting a conspiracy theory that claimed the FBI was involved. Mehdi Hasan of MSNBC criticized Taibbi on Twitter for the appearance of performing public relations for Musk; Taibbi responded by asking how many of his critics "have run stories for anonymous sources at the FBI, CIA, the Pentagon, [and] White House."

Miranda Devine, a columnist with the New York Post who was among the first to write about the laptop, told Fox News host Tucker Carlson that the presentation regarding the story wasn't the "smoking gun we'd hoped for". Jim Geraghty of National Review wrote that "the files paint an ugly portrait of a social-media company's management unilaterally deciding that its role was to keep breaking news away from the public instead of letting people see the reporting and drawing their own conclusions."

Intelligencer wrote that the first two installments contained "a couple [of] genuinely concerning findings" but were "saturated in hyperbole, marred by omissions of context, and discredited by instances of outright mendacity" and thus "best understood as an egregious example of the very phenomenon it purports to condemn — that of social-media managers leveraging their platforms for partisan ends."

Charlie Warzel of The Atlantic characterized the initial two threads as "sloppy, anecdotal, devoid of context, and...old news," but wrote that the files demonstrated the "immense power" possessed by Big Tech platforms as a result of "[outsourcing] broad swaths of our political discourse and news consumption to corporate platforms." He also suggested that Musk's core goal is to "anger liberals" and appeal to the political right, citing him allowing the documents to only be accessed by select people "who've expressed alignment with his pet issues" and telling his followers to vote Republican in the 2022 midterm elections.

After the first Weiss thread, Caleb Ecarma of Vanity Fair wrote it was still unknown how many accounts had been "shadow banned," how they had been selected, and what their political persuasions were. He noted that several prominent leftist and anti-fascist users had been banned under Musk, while he had reinstated several banned prominent right-leaning users.

Katherine Cross of Wired portrayed Weiss' and Taibbi's threads as "transparency theater", writing that Musk's ulterior motive is to achieve "freedom from any accountability" and "a world where no one tells him 'no'". Cross said that the word "shadowban" has become "whatever people want it to mean", comparing it to the use of the word "woke" by the political right. She also asked why Musk had not been transparent about his own decision-making, suggesting that "everything they have falsely accused Twitter of doing is what they seek to do to their many ideological enemies".

The Editorial Board at The Wall Street Journal praised the release for exposing "a form of political corruption" where current and former U.S. intelligence officials have an influence on elections. Gerard Baker of The Wall Street Journal wrote that the Twitter Files "exposed how a powerful class of like-minded people control and limit the flow of information to advantage their monolithically progressive agenda" and added that they "tell us nothing new", and that it does not contain any "shocking revelation" regarding government censorship or manipulation by political campaigns. Baker added that the Files "bring to the surface the internal deliberations of a company dealing with complex issues in ways consistent with its values." Ted Rall of the Wall Street Journal asked: "Can't both sides back free speech?"

Oliver Darcy of CNN commented on the fact multiple news organizations were not reporting on the Twitter Files, saying that this is because "the releases have largely not contained any revelatory information", for the Files only demonstrate "how messy content moderation can be—especially when under immense pressure and dealing with the former President of the United States." However, he noted news outlets not covering the Files allows for "dishonest actors in right-wing media" to hijack the narrative with "warped interpretation[s]", thus creating complications for laypeople trying to research the Files. CNN interviewed six technology executives and senior managers, as well as multiple federal officials familiar with the matter, all of whom said the FBI had not given Twitter any directive to suppress the Hunter Biden laptop story.

Following the sixth release of Files, Robby Soave of the libertarian magazine Reason wrote that "social media companies have every right to moderate jokes" but called the FBI's communications with the company "inappropriate" and a "free speech violation". He commented that it was "frankly disturbing" for tech companies and the federal government to be "working in tandem to crack down on dissent, contrarianism, and even humor". Elizabeth Brown of the magazine opined that the documents presented in the seventh installment were "interesting—though hardly the sort of smoking guns many on the right are making them out to be". She wrote that the documents were not proof of Twitter trying to rig the 2020 presidential election in Joe Biden's favor by suppressing the Post story but rather an "understandable mistake" done in reaction to accusations of the site aiding Russian trolls in 2016 and "pressure from government forces" such as the FBI and DHS, who she said were the "real villains here".

A year after the launch of the Twitter Files an article on their impact by Brittany Bernstein was published in the National Review. The article assesses national awareness of government censorship of social media and attributes Elon Musk's "shocking transparency" as a key factor leading to the "Fifth Circuit U.S. Court of Appeals ruling that the White House likely "coerced the platforms to make their moderation decisions by way of intimidating messages and threats of adverse consequences."

=== Wikipedia article ===
Musk accused Wikipedia of "non-trivial left-wing bias" after the Twitter Files article was considered for deletion, replying to screenshots of select users referring to it as "not notable" and a "nothing burger"; however, the final decision was to keep the article.

== Aftermath ==
In June 2023, lawyers working for Twitter contested many of the claims made in the Twitter Files in court. According to CNN, "the filing by Musk's own corporate lawyers represents a step-by-step refutation of some of the most explosive claims to come out of the Twitter Files and that in some cases have been promoted by Musk himself."

As a result of the Twitter Files, Renée DiResta, a misinformation researcher formerly at the Stanford Internet Observatory, became the center of a conspiracy theory that falsely claimed she was a CIA operative leading a large-scale censorship operation. DiResta confirmed she participated in a scholarship program with the CIA that ended in 2004 and denied any further involvement with the organization. In an interview with Taylor Lorenz, DiResta said that the Files also contained the unredacted names of her students, who then received death threats.

In 2024, after a hack of the Trump campaign which resulted in a release of opposition research on JD Vance, Twitter (now X) coordinated with the Trump campaign to suppress the story, including X banning journalists who linked to or mentioned the story. This drew comparisons to the Twitter Files.

== Missouri v. Biden ==
On March 24, 2026, the Trump administration reached a settlement agreement in Missouri v. Biden, promising that three federal agencies would no longer pressure companies to remove or suppress content. This resolves the lawsuit brought by Missouri and Louisiana and other plaintiffs that the Biden administration had threatened social media platforms' posts about the 2020 election, the Hunter Biden laptop controversy and COVID-19. The Twitter Files and congressional investigations showed extensive government–platform coordination on content moderation.
