= Congressional Antitrust Caucus =

Caucus in the US House of Representatives

- Co-Chairs (as of March 2023): Rep. Ken Buck (R-CO) and David Cicilline (D-RI)
- Political position: Bipartisan
- Seats in the House: 4 / 435

The Congressional Antitrust Caucus is a bipartisan congressional caucus in the United States House of Representatives formed in 2023. Co-founded by representatives David Cicilline (D-RI) and Ken Buck (R-CO), the caucus is composed of individuals supportive of reinvigorating antitrust enforcement. A caucus with the same name was established during the 115th United States Congress in October 2017.

== Background and history ==
According to Bloomberg, Buck and Cicilline founded the caucus in the 118th Congress in order to "keep a focus on reforming US antitrust laws to curb the power" of Amazon, Apple, Google, and Facebook parent company Meta Platforms. During the previous congressional session, a bipartisan effort championed by both members to rein in the market power of the four "Big Tech" ultimately did not pass.

In February 2023, co-chair Cicilline announced he would resign from Congress, effective June 1, 2023.

== Membership ==
=== 117th Congress ===
Membership of the Congressional Antitrust Caucus as of March 24, 2023:

- David Cicilline (D‑RI‑1) - co-chair and co-founder (note: Cicilline resigned from Congress on June 1, 2023)
- Ken Buck (R‑CO‑4) - co-chair and co-founder
- Pramila Jayapal (D‑WA‑7)
- Ro Khanna (D‑CA‑17)
- Mark Pocan (D‑WI‑2)
