= David Zweig (journalist) =

American journalist

David Zweig is an American journalist and author. He has written extensively on topics relating to COVID-19. He wrote the tenth installment of the Twitter Files focusing on Twitter and COVID-19. He has written for The Atlantic, New York Magazine's Intelligencer, The Free Press, The New York Times, and Wired.

== Career ==
=== Early career ===
David Zweig released two albums in the early 2000s, All Now With Wings and Keep Going, which were produced by Keith Cleversley.

=== Novels ===
Zweig is the author of three books. His novel "Swimming Inside the Sun" was notable for exploring the concept of depersonalization. He describes this perspective as follows: "Fiction Depersonalization Syndrome, a hypothesis that I have developed, posits that immersion in the Western world’s highly mediated environment ...leads to increased self-consciousness; the extreme endpoint of this phenomenon is depersonalization, a psychological disorder where one is literally watching oneself from afar, as if in a movie or a dream."

=== Journalism ===
Zweig is best known for his articles regarding the COVID-19 pandemic in the United States, authoring a series of investigative pieces challenging contemporary responses to the pandemic, particularly school closures, and the enforcement of various interventions, including mask mandates in schools and the evidence supporting such mandates. His articles "The Science of Masking Kids in School Remains Uncertain," and "The CDC's Flawed Case for Wearing Masks in School" proved to be influential works for critics of mask mandates in schools. Zweig was present at the Great Barrington Declaration.

He testified as an expert witness before the United States House of Representatives Early Childhood, Elementary, and Secondary Education Subcommittee Hearing “Back to School: Highlighting Best Practices For Safely Reopening School” on Wednesday, September 29, 2021, and at the House Oversight and Accountability Select Subcommittee on the Coronavirus Pandemic meeting on March 28, 2023.

== Bibliography ==
- Invisibles: The Power of Anonymous Work in an Age of Relentless Self-Promotion (2015)
- Swimming Inside the Sun (Second Guess Media, 2009)
- An Abundance of Caution: American Schools, the Virus, and a Story of Bad Decisions (MIT Press, 2025)
