= An Abundance of Caution =

2025 non-fiction book

An Abundance of Caution: American Schools, the Virus, and a Story of Bad Decisions is a 2025 book by David Zweig that examines the decisions and decision makers behind the extended closures of public schools during the COVID-19 pandemic in the United States.
