= Yoel Roth =

American social media executive

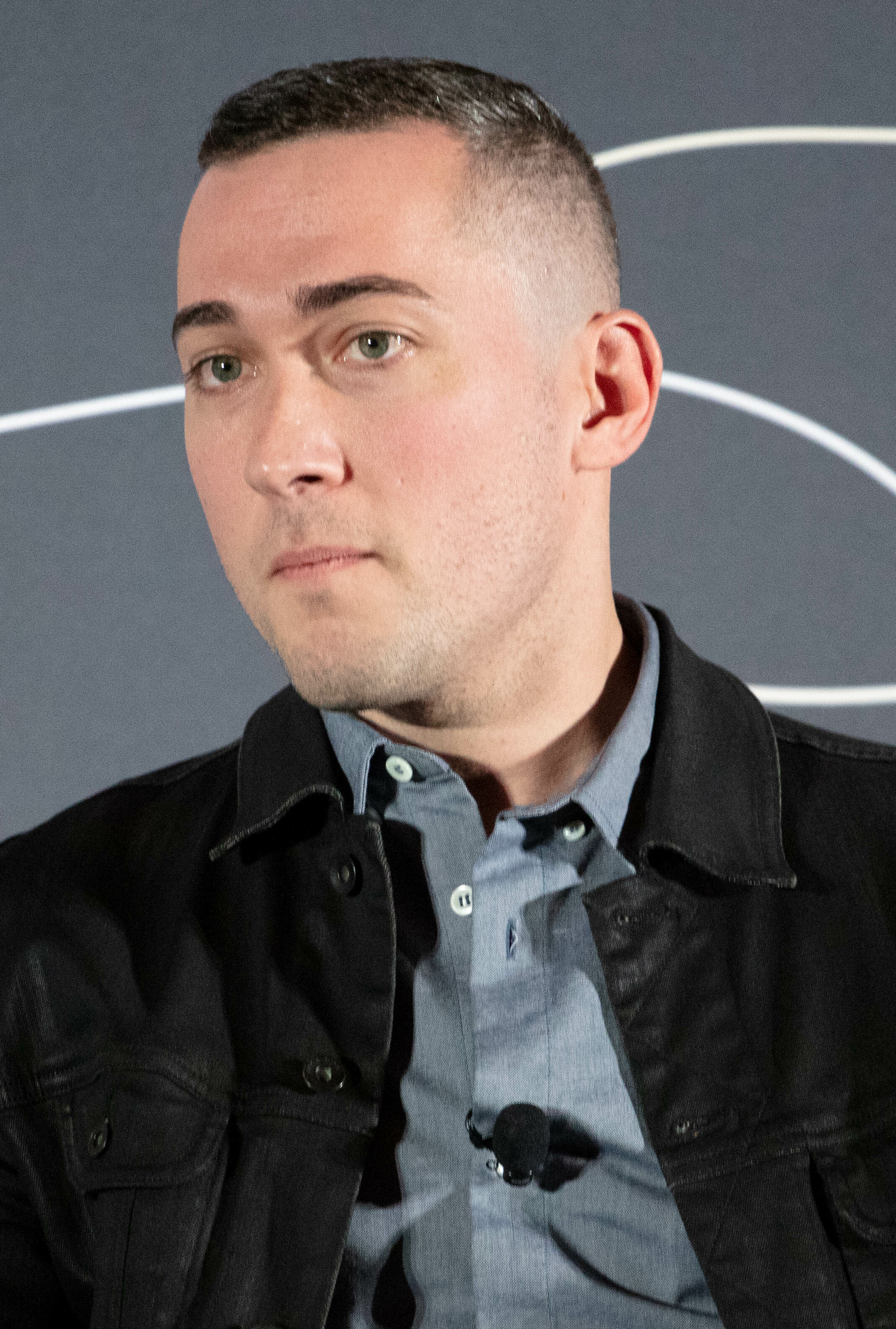
- Roth in 2022
- Born: 1987 (age 37–38); California, U.S.
- Education: Swarthmore College (BA); University of Pennsylvania (PhD)
- Title: Head of Trust and Safety at Twitter (2022)
- Spouse: Nicholas Madsen (m. 2019)
- Scientific career
- Fields: Communication studies
- Thesis: Gay Data (2016)
- Doctoral advisor: Sharrona Pearl

Yoel Roth (born 1987) is an American technology executive who is the head of trust and safety at Match Group. Roth served as the head of Twitter's trust and safety department, a position he stepped down from in November 2022, after Elon Musk's acquisition of Twitter. Roth is a technology policy fellow at the Goldman School of Public Policy at the University of California, Berkeley. In addition, he is a technical advisor on the Commission on Information Disorder at the Aspen Institute and a board member at Indiana University's Observatory on Social Media.

== Early life and education ==
Roth was born in California in 1987 and grew up in Boca Raton, Florida. Raised in a Jewish family, Roth is an atheist.

Roth attended Swarthmore College, graduating in 2011 with a Bachelor of Arts and high honors in political science, and a minor in film and media studies. At Swarthmore College, Roth was an editor of The Swarthmore Phoenix. He then enrolled in the Annenberg School for Communication at the University of Pennsylvania. Roth graduated in 2015 with a Ph.D. in communication. Roth's dissertation focused on location-based dating apps, particularly those of gay men. According to a Medium post he wrote in 2016, Roth's interest in safety was inspired by an incident in which he outed an athlete as gay, later feeling guilty. Speaking to journalist Casey Newton on This American Life, Roth recounted meeting a content moderator for the dating site Manhunt, inspiring him to write his dissertation. Roth was also a researcher at the Berkman Klein Center for Internet & Society at Harvard University before joining Twitter.

== Career ==
=== Twitter ===
Roth joined the social media site Twitter as an intern moderating content in 2014. In July 2015, he was promoted to senior program manager for product trust. His entrance at the company came as a memo written by then-CEO Dick Costolo was released admitting that Twitter's content moderation was lackluster. In 2018, he was promoted to head of site integrity. During his tenure at Twitter, Roth was involved in efforts to counter disinformation during the 2016 United States elections, including the Internet Research Agency's interference.

In May 2020, then president Donald Trump claimed that mail-in ballots were going to lead to fraud. Roth took direct action against the tweet by labeling it as inaccurate, citing Twitter's policy against electoral fraudhood, marking the first time a tweet from Trump had action taken against it. Concurrently, Twitter's communications team announced the decision. The label included a blog post signed by Roth; three days later, Kellyanne Conway, Counselor to the President, mentioned Roth on Fox & Friends and blamed him for censorship on Twitter as a whole. The New York Post included Roth on the cover of their next issue, with Trump holding up a copy as he announced an executive order against censorship by technology companies.

The release of the Twitter Files brought renewed attention to Roth. During a Twitter Spaces discussion involving Musk, a participant brought up Roth's dissertation at the University of Pennsylvania falsely suggesting he supported children accessing adult Internet sites, such as Grindr. Musk then claimed that Twitter "refused to take action on child exploitation for years", which founder and CEO Jack Dorsey disputed. Musk's tweet forced Roth and his family to leave their home as he received death threats. Musk's comments echoed rhetoric adjacent to the conspiracy theory QAnon.

Since leaving Twitter, Roth has spoken about the apprehension during the development of Birdwatch, now known as Community Notes, and how it was intended to complement rather than replace other means of moderating misinformation. Prior to the entire curation team being fired, Roth elaborated that "there was a belief amongst the Trust and Safety team that people would not do uncompensated labor at scale".

=== Match Group ===
In February 2024, Roth became the head of trust and safety at Match Group.

== Personal life ==
Roth is gay and married Nicholas Madsen in August 2019 at San Francisco City Hall. Roth met Madsen on a dating app.

In February 2023, Roth testified in a United States House Committee on Oversight and Accountability hearing on the Hunter Biden laptop controversy, following a letter from committee chairman James Comer. During the hearing, representative Marjorie Taylor Greene resurfaced Musk's claims of pedophilia. Roth's testimony was used by representative Stacey Plaskett to illustrate the impact of the Twitter Files.

=== Politics ===
During the 2016 United States presidential election, Roth donated to Hillary Clinton's campaign. He is opposed to the policies of then Senate Majority Leader Mitch McConnell and president Donald Trump.
