= Martin Gurri =

CIA analyst and writer

Martin Gurri (born April 17, 1949) is a former CIA analyst who writes about the relationship between politics and media. He is a visiting fellow at the Mercatus Center at George Mason University in Virginia and is a contributing writer to the center's Discourse magazine. He served at the Director of National Intelligence Open Source Center in various senior positions, including director of research. Gurri is the author of the book The Revolt of the Public and the Crisis of Authority in the New Millennium, which he self-published in 2014 and then updated in 2018, when Stripe Publishing re-issued it with his "extensive analysis of Donald Trump’s improbable rise to the presidency and the electoral triumphs of 'Brexit'".

In his blog, "The Fifth Wave," he states that "Information expands in great waves which sweep over the human landscape and leave little untouched. We stand at the earliest moment of what promises to be a cataclysmic expansion of information and communication technologies: the fifth wave."

Gurri was born in Cuba and came to the U.S. with his parents in the 1950s. He and his wife, Amy Tilson Gurri, have two sons, Adam and David, a daughter, Cati, and two grandsons.

== Books ==
- The Revolt of the Public and the Crisis of Authority in the New Millennium (2018)
