= Oxford Handbooks of Political Science =

The Oxford Handbooks of Political Science is a ten-volume set of reference books which provide critical overviews of the state of political science. Each volume focuses on a particular political science topic, with volumes on political methodology, public policy, political theory, political economy, comparative politics, contextual political analysis, international relations, law and politics, political behavior, and political institutions. The general editor of the series is Robert E. Goodin.
