= Michael O. Sawyer =

American constitutional law professor (1919–2002)

- Born: 1919; Syracuse, New York, US
- Died: December 24, 2002 (aged 83); Liverpool, New York, US
- Education: Syracuse University; George Washington University
- Scientific career
- Fields: constitutional law
- Workplaces: Syracuse University
- Thesis: Study of the activities of citizenship (A survey of two diverse communities). (1952)

Michael O. Sawyer (1919–2002) was an American university administrator and constitutional law professor who worked at the Maxwell School of Citizenship and Public Affairs at Syracuse University for over 42 years. He was known for his mentoring of thousands of students.

== Early life and education ==
Sawyer earned his BS (1941), MS (1947), & PhD (1957) from Syracuse University. He also earned a JD from the George Washington University (1962). His 1952 doctoral thesis was titled "Study of the activities of citizenship (A survey of two diverse communities)".

He was a Ford Foundation post-doctoral fellow, and was a scholar-in-residence for the United States Commission on Civil Rights.

== Career ==
Sawyer began his career as an instructor at the Maxwell School of Citizenship and Public Affairs in 1948 and was promoted to assistant professor (1952), associate professor (1957), and full professor in 1965. In 1970s, he began working with Syracuse chancellor Melvin Eggers in various administrative posts.

Sawyer published many articles, conference papers, and several books on public law, American studies. He held visiting lectureships at the University of Colorado, University of Delaware, University of Georgia, University of North Carolina, University of Notre Dame, and University of Oregon.

== Awards and honors ==
At Syracuse, He received several university awards, including the Outstanding Professor of Syracuse University (1986), Syracuse's highest alumni – honor the George Arents Pioneer Medal (1986), and the St. Thomas More Award (1987).

When he retired in 1990, the Maxwell school established The Michael O. Sawyer Chair of Constitutional Law and Politics in his honor. Some of the notable scholars to hold the chaired position are Stephen Macedo, Keith J. Bybee, and Thomas M. Keck. A student award was also named in his honor.

The Maxwell school hosts the Sawyer Law and Politics Program (SLAPP). It also hosts the Michael O. Sawyer Post-Doctoral Fellowship in Law and Politics.

== Death ==
Sawyer died at the age of 83 on December 24, 2002, in Liverpool, New York, due to complications from Alzheimer's disease.
