= Director of the National Institutes of Health =

Leading role in US federal department

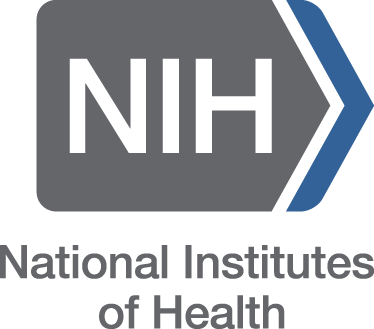

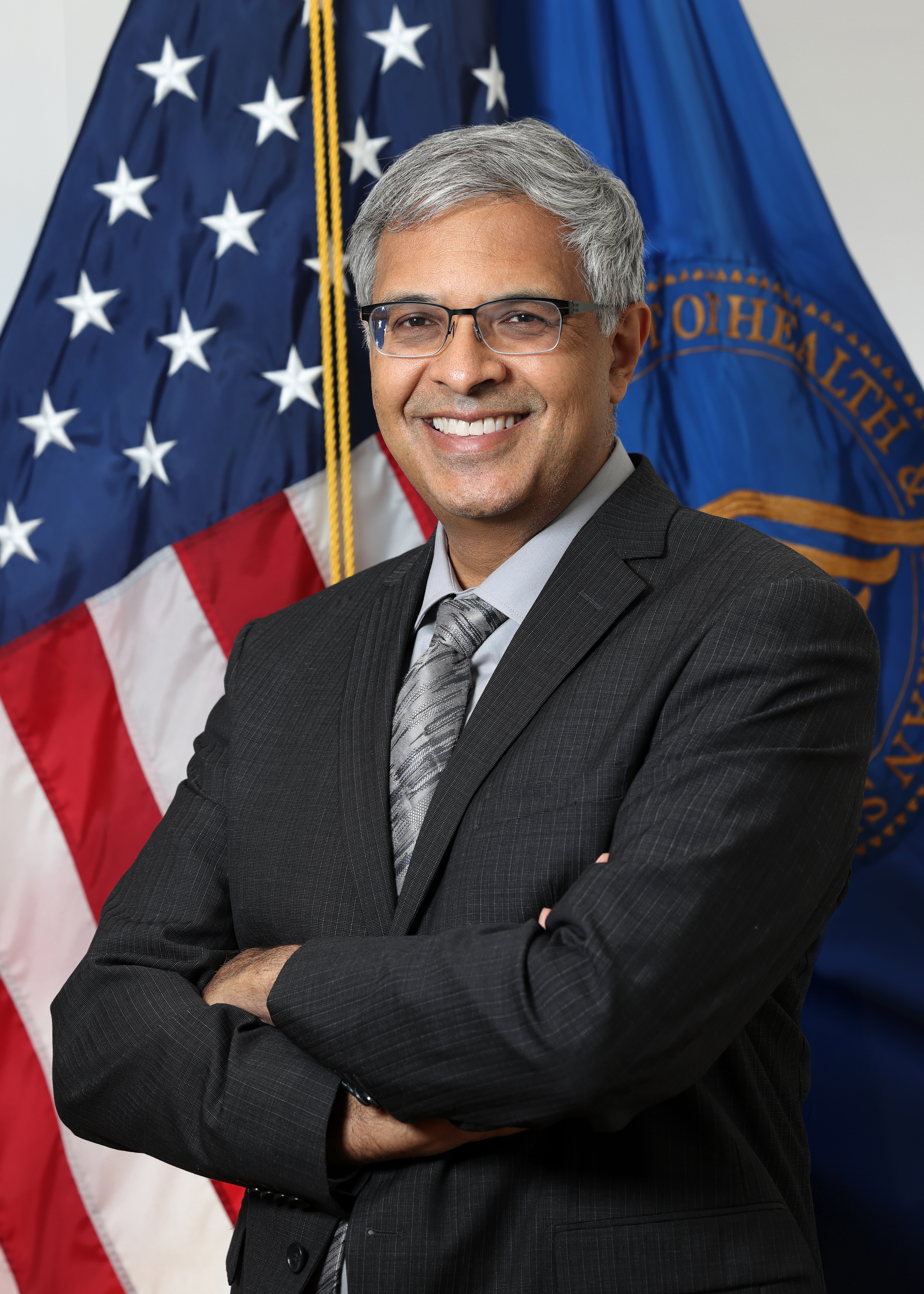
- Incumbent; Jay Bhattacharya since April 1, 2025
- Appointer: The president
- Formation: August 1887
- First holder: Joseph J. Kinyoun
- Website: Official website

In the United States, the National Institutes of Health (NIH) is the primary agency responsible for medical research. The director of the National Institutes of Health plays an active role in shaping the agency's activities and outlook. The director is responsible for providing leadership to the institutes and for constantly identifying needs and opportunities, especially for efforts that involve multiple institutes. The NIH director is responsible for advising the U.S. president on their annual budget request to Congress on the basis of extensive discussions with the institute directors.

== History ==
The position of the NIH director became presidentially appointed with the passage of the National Cancer Act of 1971 and Senate confirmed with the National Cancer Act Amendments of 1974. Prior to 1971, all NIH directors were appointed by the surgeon general, with the exception of Robert Q. Marston, who was appointed by the secretary of health, education, and welfare. Acting directors are selected by the secretary of health and human services and hold the position until the president nominates a new director who is confirmed by the Senate.

== List of directors ==
The following persons served as directors of the National Institutes of Health:

Unnumbered, colored rows indicate acting directors.

No.	Portrait	Name	Term start	Term end	Appointed by	Refs.
1		Joseph J. Kinyoun (Note: Kinyoun was appointed the first director of the U.S. Hygienic Laboratory by the Surgeon General in 1887.)	August 1887	April 30, 1899	John B. Hamilton	
2		Milton J. Rosenau	May 1, 1899	September 30, 1909	Walter Wyman	
3		John F. Anderson	October 1, 1909	November 19, 1915	Walter Wyman	
4		George W. McCoy (Note: The U.S. Hygienic Laboratory was renamed the National Institute of Health in 1930 under the Ransdell Act.)	November 20, 1915	January 31, 1937	Rupert Blue	
5		Lewis Ryers Thompson	February 1, 1937	January 31, 1942	Thomas Parran	
6		Rolla Dyer (Note: The National Institute of Health was renamed the National Institutes of Health in 1948 as part of reorganization that was authorized under the National Heart Act.)	February 1, 1942	September 30, 1950	Thomas Parran	
7		William H. Sebrell Jr.	October 1, 1950	July 31, 1955	Leonard A. Scheele	
8		James A. Shannon	August 1, 1955	August 31, 1968	Leonard A. Scheele	
9		Robert Q. Marston (Note: With the approval of President Johnson, Marston was appointed NIH director by HEW secretary Wilbur J. Cohen. Marston was head of another HEW department at the time of the appointment.) (Note: Starting in 1971, directors became presidential appointees serving at the pleasure of the commander in chief as a result of the passage of the National Cancer Act.)	September 1, 1968	January 21, 1973	Wilbur J. Cohen	
–		John F. Sherman (Note: NIH deputy director)	January 21, 1973	May 28, 1973	Elliot L. Richardson	
10		Robert Stone	May 29, 1973	January 31, 1975	Richard Nixon	
–		Ronald W. Lamont-Havers	February 1, 1975	June 30, 1975	Caspar Weinberger	
11		Donald S. Fredrickson	July 1, 1975	June 30, 1981	Jimmy Carter	
–		Thomas E. Malone	July 1, 1981	April 28, 1982	Richard S. Schweiker	
12		James Wyngaarden	April 29, 1982	July 31, 1989	Ronald Reagan	
–		William F. Raub	August 1, 1989	April 8, 1991	Louis Wade Sullivan	
13		Bernadine Healy	April 8, 1991	June 30, 1993	George H. W. Bush	
–		Ruth L. Kirschstein	July 1, 1993	November 22, 1993	Donna Shalala	
14		Harold E. Varmus	November 23, 1993	December 31, 1999	Bill Clinton	
–		Ruth L. Kirschstein	January 1, 2000	May 1, 2002	Donna Shalala	
15		Elias Zerhouni	May 2, 2002	October 31, 2008	George W. Bush	
–		Raynard S. Kington	November 1, 2008	August 16, 2009	Michael O. Leavitt	
16		Francis Collins	August 17, 2009	December 19, 2021	Barack Obama	
–		Lawrence A. Tabak (Note: NIH principal deputy director)	December 20, 2021	November 8, 2023	Xavier Becerra	
17		Monica Bertagnolli	November 9, 2023	January 17, 2025	Joe Biden	
–		Matthew Memoli (Note: Director of the Laboratory of Infectious Diseases (LID) Clinical Studies Unit, National Institute of Allergy and Infectious Diseases (NIAID))	January 22, 2025	March 31, 2025	Dorothy Fink	
18		Jay Bhattacharya	April 1, 2025	Present	Donald Trump	

Table notes:
