= Bernadine Healy =

American cardiologist and NIH director (1944–2011)

Bernardine Healy
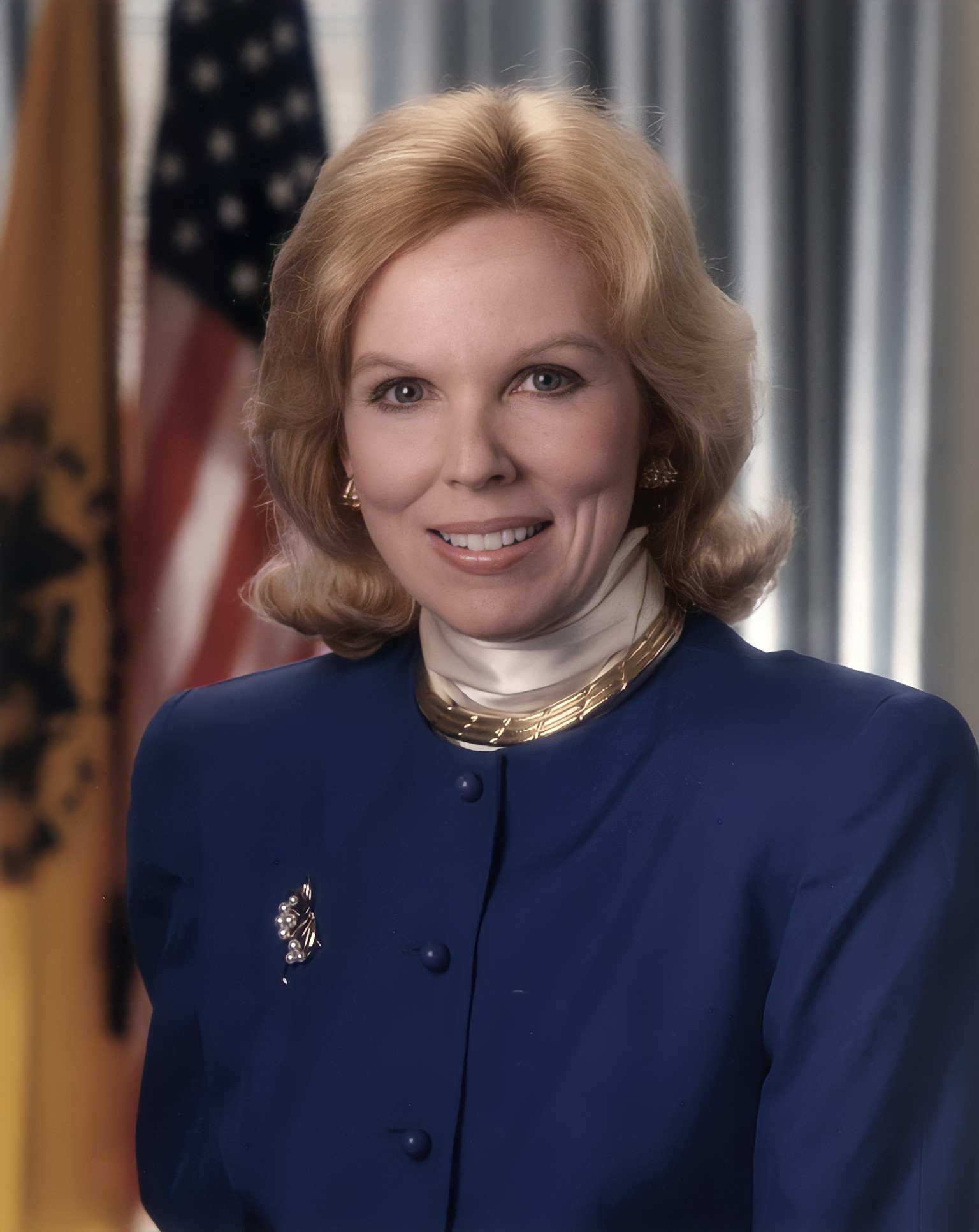

13th Director of the National Institutes of Health
- In office April 9, 1991 – June 30, 1993
- President: George H. W. Bush; Bill Clinton
- Preceded by: James Wyngaarden
- Succeeded by: Harold Varmus

Personal details
- Born: Bernadine Patricia Healy; August 4, 1944 New York City, U.S.
- Died: August 6, 2011 (aged 67) Gates Mills, Ohio, U.S.
- Education: Vassar College; Harvard Medical School
- Medical career
- Profession: Physician
- Field: Cardiology
- Institutions: Cleveland Clinic; National Institutes of Health; Johns Hopkins University; Ohio State University

Bernadine Patricia Healy (August 4, 1944 – August 6, 2011) was an American cardiologist and the first female director of the National Institutes of Health (NIH).

During her career, Healy held leadership positions at the Johns Hopkins University, the Cleveland Clinic, Ohio State University, and Harvard University. She was also president of both the American Red Cross and the American Heart Association. She was health editor and columnist for U.S. News & World Report and a well-known commentator in the news media on health issues.

== Early years and family ==
Healy was born on August 4, 1944, in New York City to Violet McGrath and Michael Healy, the second of their four daughters. She was raised in Long Island City, Queens. Her parents stressed the importance of education and she excelled at her studies. In 1962, she graduated top of her class at the Hunter College High School in Manhattan. With a full scholarship, she attended Vassar College, graduating summa cum laude in 1965 with a major in chemistry and a minor in philosophy. She was elected to Phi Beta Kappa. She then went on to Harvard Medical School, also on full scholarship, and was one of only ten women out of 120 students in her class. After graduating cum laude from Harvard Medical School in 1970, she completed her internship and residency in internal medicine and cardiology fellowship at the Johns Hopkins School of Medicine and Johns Hopkins Hospital. After finishing her post-doctoral training, she became the first woman to join its full-time faculty in cardiology and rose quickly to the rank of professor of medicine.

For eight years she headed the coronary care unit at the Johns Hopkins Hospital. At the medical school, she served as assistant dean for post-doctoral programs and faculty development. During that time she organized a nationally covered Mary Elizabeth Garrett symposium on women in medicine which examined the opportunities and hurdles faced by women physicians roughly 90 years after the founding of the medical school in 1893, and at the same time honored Garrett, the Victorian socialite and philanthropist who made sure that Johns Hopkins School of Medicine opened its admissions to women (the medical school opened its doors in October 1893; and three of the eighteen original candidates for the M.D. degree were women) and ultimately admitted women and men precisely on the same terms.

== Affiliations ==
While at Johns Hopkins, Healy held several leadership positions in organizations such as the American Federation of Clinical Research, the American College of Cardiology, and the American Heart Association, an organization she later led as its volunteer president, and served on advisory committees to the National Heart, Lung and Blood Institute.

The nonprofit Age of Autism named her 2008 Person of the Year for her publicly stated opinion that it had not been shown that vaccination is not a trigger or cause of autism, and for her vigorous insistence that adequate science be done to resolve the issue. The scientific consensus was and is that no association has been found between vaccines and autism.

== Cleveland Clinic ==
In 1985 Healy left Washington and moved to Cleveland where she became chair of the Cleveland Clinic Lerner Research Institute and also practiced cardiology. In addition to building major new programs in molecular biology, neuroscience, and cancer biology, she headed a large NIH-funded research program in hypertension, and was the lead investigator for the Cleveland Clinic's participation in a major clinical research study comparing angioplasty with coronary artery bypass surgery. She headed the NIH advisory board for another multi-center clinical study that showed that statins could slow the course of atherosclerosis in coronary artery bypass grafts. During this time she initiated a medical student program in alliance with Ohio State University that served as a precursor to the founding of the Cleveland Clinic Lerner College of Medicine in 2004.

== American Red Cross ==
Healy was recruited away from Ohio State to become president and CEO of the American Red Cross in late 1999, succeeding Elizabeth Dole. From the outset, she strove to unite the various services and volunteers under the banner "Together we can save a life."

Her tenure at the Red Cross was unsteady. In the spring of 2001, the FDA issued a record fine to the Red Cross for mishandling CMV infected blood products.

The American Red Cross was criticized in the news media, notably by Fox News Channel host Bill O'Reilly, New York State Attorney General Eliot Spitzer, and some in Congress for misleading donors by soliciting and receiving donations worth $564 million after the 9/11 attacks, after it was discovered that the majority of the received funds were put aside for the organization's long-term use rather than going to support victims and volunteers. The Red Cross was forced to change its policy.

Healy also advocated withholding dues from the International Federation of Red Cross and Red Crescent Societies for not allowing Israel's Red Cross society (Magen David Adom) to join the international body without adopting the cross or crescent as its symbol. The Red Cross Board of Directors hired her as a "change agent" but chafed at her steely managerial style and the board's "loss of control over day-to-day decision-making." The board forced her resignation in the wake of these disagreements and controversies. Healy departed the organization as president on December 31, 2001.

== Government service ==
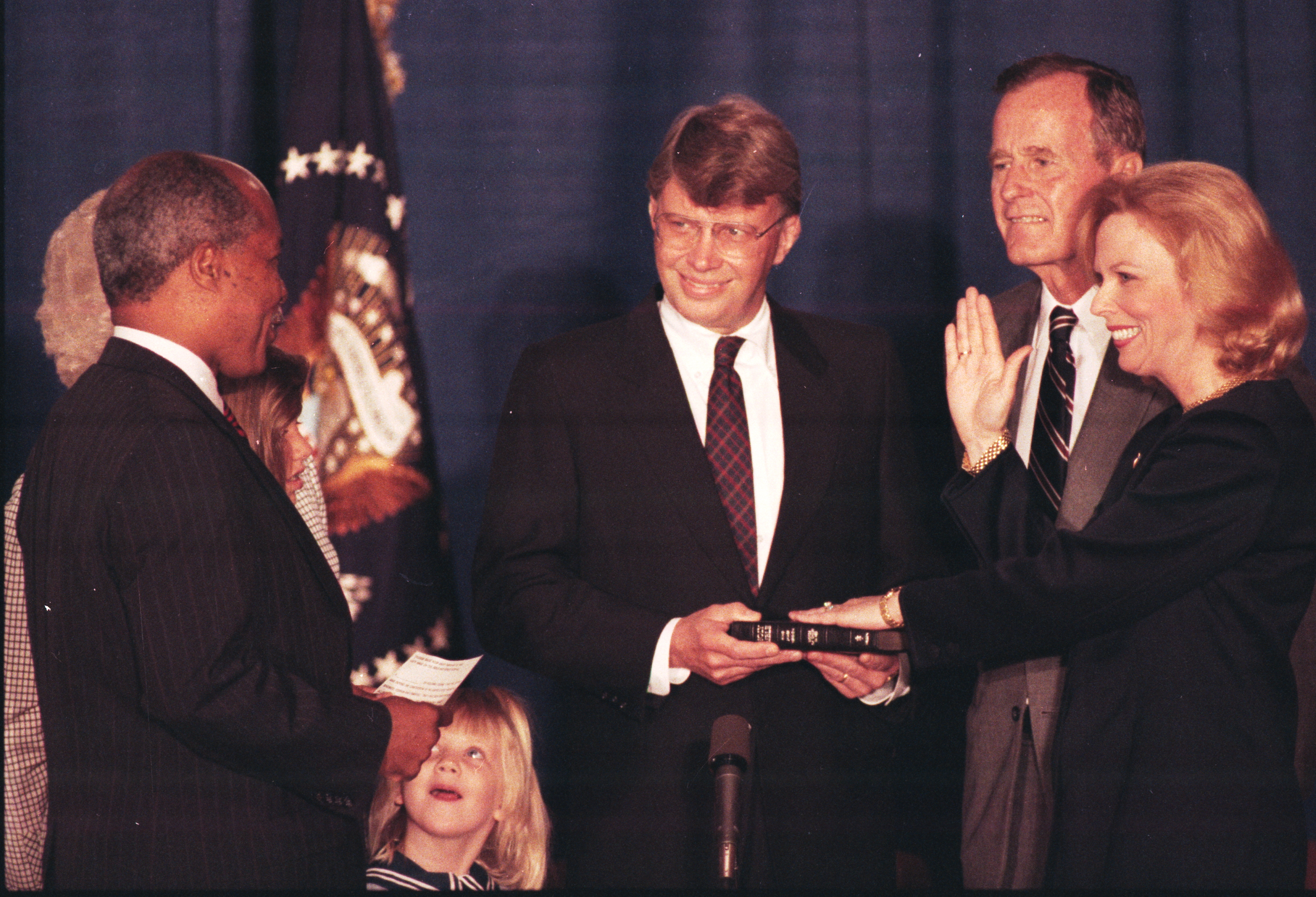
Healy (right) with President George H. W. Bush in 1991, being sworn in as director of the National Institutes of Health

=== Presidential Advisor ===
President Ronald Reagan appointed Healy deputy director of the White House Office of Science and Technology Policy. She served as chairman of the White House Cabinet Group on Biotechnology, executive secretary of the White House Science Council's Panel on the Health of Universities, and a member of several advisory groups on developing government-wide guidelines for research in human subjects and for the humane treatment of animals in research. She subsequently served on the President's Council of Advisers on Science and Technology during the administration of Presidents George H. W. Bush and George W. Bush.

=== National Institutes of Health ===
Healy was director of the Research Institute at the Cleveland Clinic Foundation when President George H. W. Bush tapped her in 1991 to become director of the NIH, its first female head. She took on many initiatives during her two years at the helm, including the development of a major intramural laboratory for human genomics; recruited a world-renowned team to head the Human Genome Project, including former NIH director Dr. Francis Collins; elevated nursing research to an independent NIH institute; and established a policy whereby the NIH would fund only those clinical trials that included both men and women when the condition being studied affects both sexes.

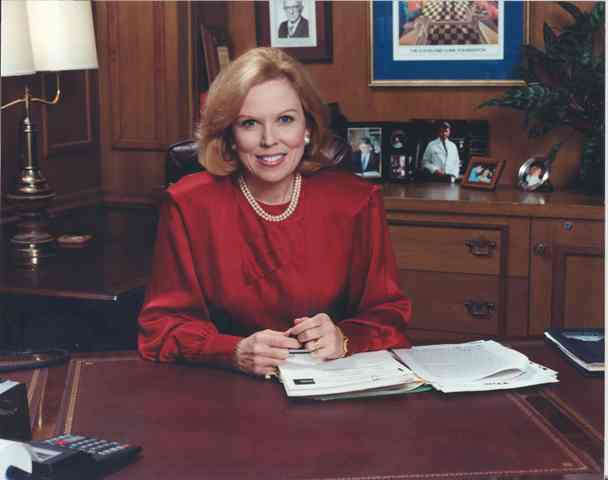
Healy served at NIH from 1991 to 1993.

According to Francis Collins, Healy was responsible for pressuring James Watson to retire as director of the Human Genome Project due to Watson's publicized belief that identified DNA gene sequences should be openly available for use to prevent disease instead of allowing DNA sequences to be patented, an idea which Watson characterized as crazy and insane, and an idea which Healy preferred.

== Women's Health Initiative ==
In 1991, she started the Women's Health Initiative studies. The WHI study was conceived and designed by Healy and remains the largest randomized clinical trial in history to involve only women, studying the effects of specific prevention strategies on major causes of death and disability in women after menopause.

== American Heart Association ==
As president of the American Heart Association from 1988 to 1989, she sought to convince both the public and medical community that heart disease is also a woman's disease, "not a man's disease in disguise." Appointed president of the American Red Cross in 1999, Healy worked to improve the safety and availability of the American blood supply while overseeing the development of a Weapons of Mass Destruction response program. In 2001 she led the organization's response to the September 11 attacks.

=== U.S. Senate candidate ===
In 1994, Healy was a Republican candidate to represent Ohio in the U.S. Senate. She ran in the GOP primary and came in second in a four-person race. Lt. Gov. Mike DeWine won and prevailed in the general election.

=== Ohio State University ===
Healy served as professor and dean of the College of Medicine from 1995 to 1999. During her tenure, the college expanded its public health programs to become a School of Public Health, re-christening the College of Medicine into a College of Medicine and Public Health.

Her efforts led to the medical school's designation as a National Center of Excellence in Women's Health. A new department of orthopaedics was created along with a planned development of a Musculoskeletal Institute. The James Cancer Center expanded its efforts in basic research with recruitment of Dr. Clara Bloomfield, an oncologist and leukemia researcher, and her husband Dr. Albert de la Chappelle, a world-famous geneticist: Together, they expanded the college's programs in cancer research and tumor genetics. Cardiovascular research and practice grew with the recruitment of Dr. Robert Michler of Columbia University, who helped to revitalize the thoracic surgery and heart transplantation programs and developed one of the earliest robotic heart surgery programs. Dr. Pascal Goldschmidt, a cardiologist and researcher, who was recruited from Johns Hopkins, helped create the Heart and Lung Institute.

=== Advisory boards ===
Healy served on numerous medical advisory committees and boards over her career. They included committees of the National Academy of Sciences' Institute of Medicine, of which she was a member, and the national Academy of Engineering; the Department of Energy, NASA, and the National Institutes of Health. She participated briefly on an advisory board of The Advancement of Sound Science Coalition (an organization later shown to have been funded by Philip Morris), and served on numerous advisory groups and boards of the American Heart Association and the American College of Cardiology, where she was an outspoken critic of smoking and its effects on the cardiovascular system.

=== Press ===
Over her career Healy served as a medical commentator and consultant for CBS, PBS and MSNBC, and made numerous appearances on CNN, C-SPAN and Fox News Channel. Healy authored a column, "On Health", for U.S. News & World Report beginning in 2003 on a wide array of medical topics from women's health to marijuana, coronary artery disease to cancer, tattoos to male circumcision, and medical preparedness to health reform.

Healy became the focus of controversy when she questioned the 2004 finding of the Institute of Medicine that the evidence refuting a link between childhood vaccinations and autism was conclusive. In a nationally televised CBS interview with Sharyl Attkisson, she alleged that the government has avoided studying whether there are any susceptible population sub-groups in which vaccination may result in autism, because of a fear that, if such a link were found between vaccines and autism, people would stop vaccinating.

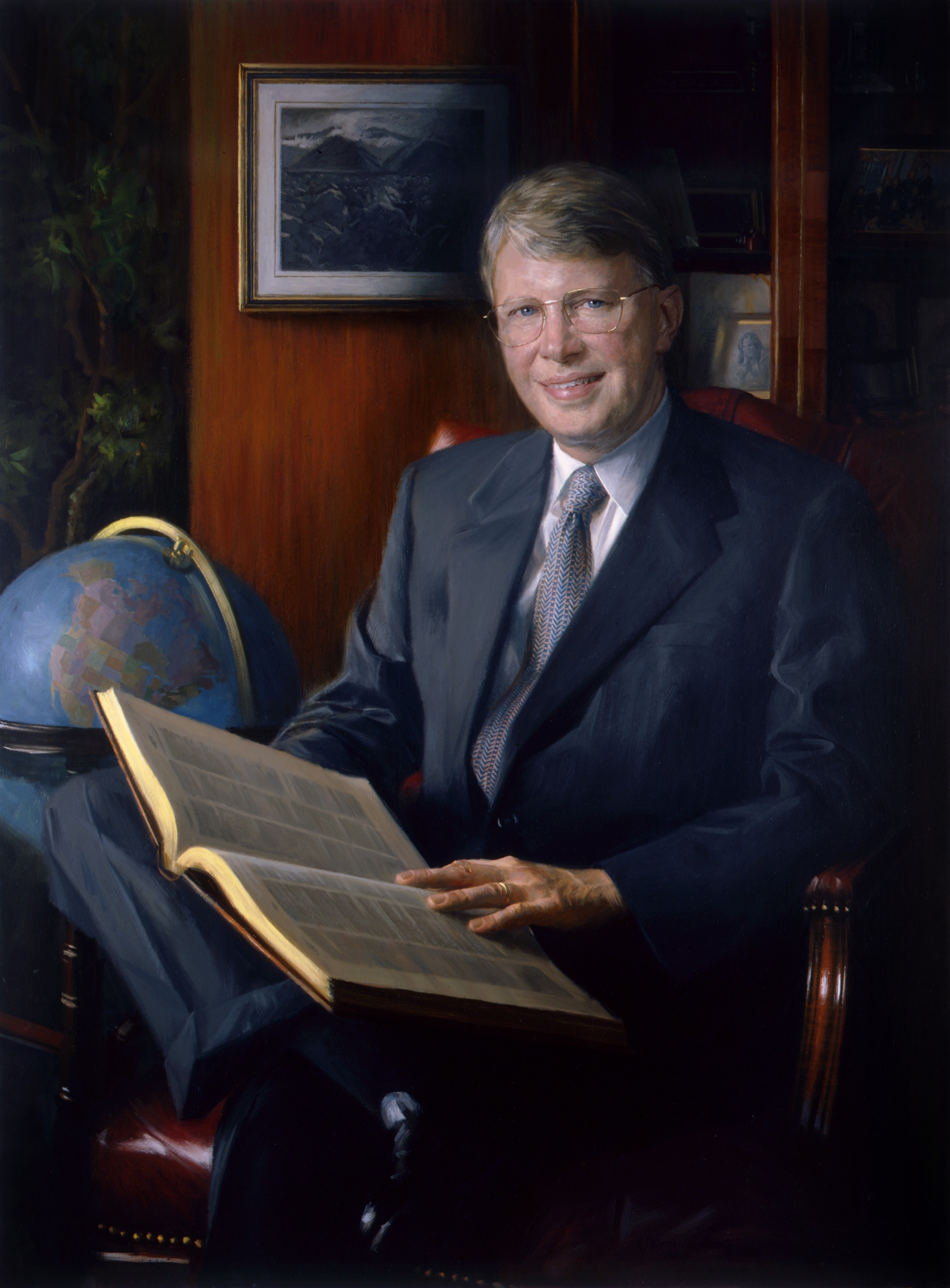
Dr. Floyd Loop official portrait painting at the Cleveland Clinic, 2003.

== Family ==
Healy was married to cardiac surgeon Floyd D. Loop, a former CEO of the Cleveland Clinic, Ohio. She and her husband had one daughter, Marie McGrath Loop. She had another daughter, Bartlett Bulkley, from her previous marriage.

== Death ==
Healy died on August 6, 2011, in Gates Mills, Ohio, ending a 13-year illness with brain cancer.

== Popular media ==
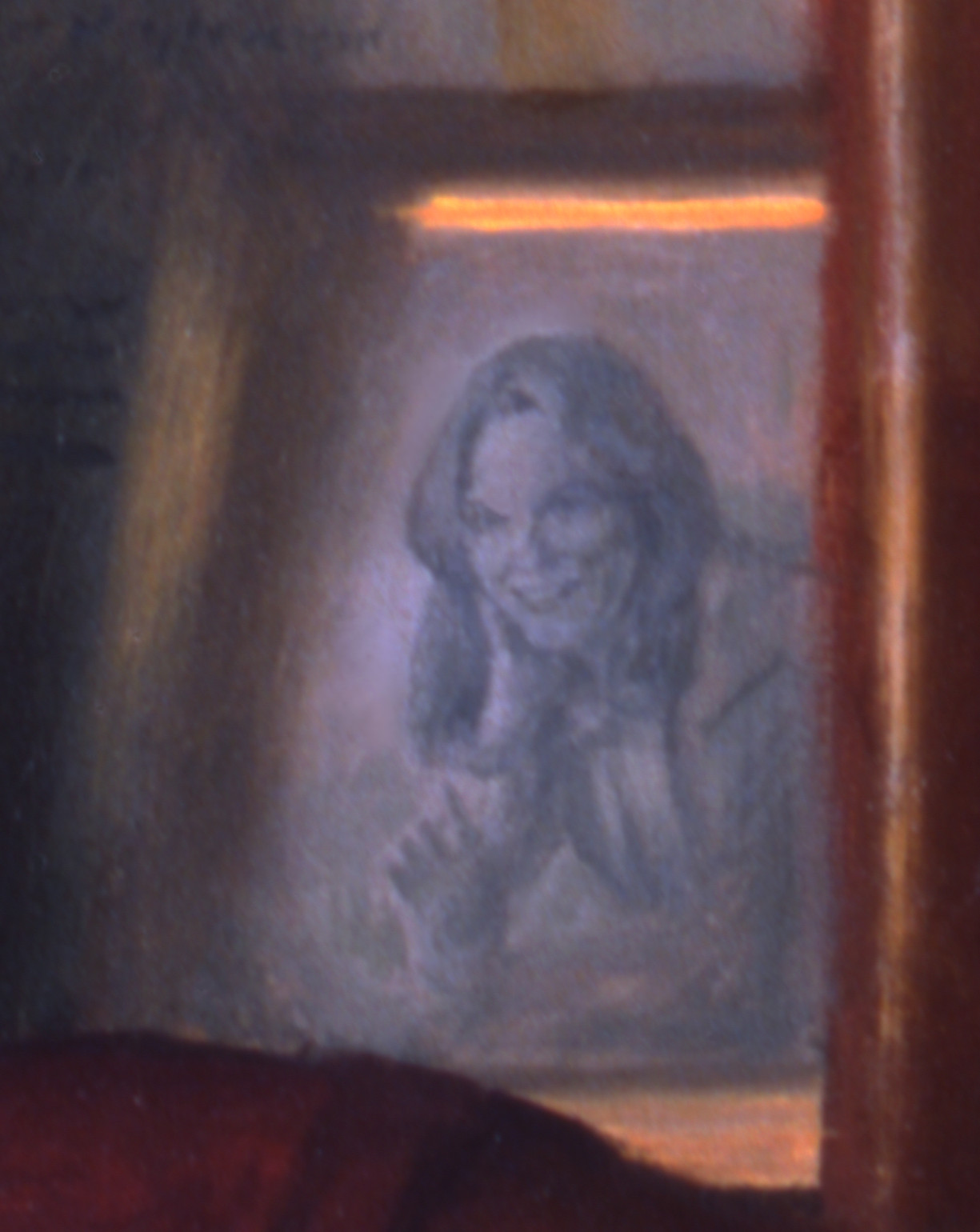
Dr. Bernadine Healy - detail from her husband's portrait, Dr. Floyd Loop, to the right of his face.

Healy is the subject of a 2018 episode of Canadian journalist Malcolm Gladwell's podcast "Revisionist History" : "Strong Verbs, Short Sentences", Season 3, Episode #9.

Government offices
Preceded by James Wyngaarden	13th Director of National Institutes of Health; 1991–1993	Succeeded by Harold Varmus
