= William H. Sebrell Jr. =

American nutritionist

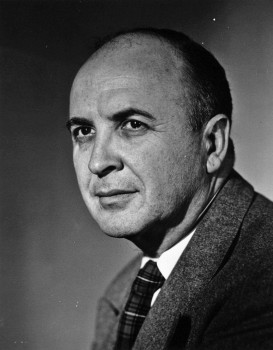

7th Director of the National Institutes of Health
- In office October 1, 1950 – July 31, 1955
- President: Harry S. Truman; Dwight D. Eisenhower
- Preceded by: Rolla Dyer
- Succeeded by: James Augustine Shannon

Personal details
- Born: September 11, 1901 Portsmouth, Virginia
- Died: September 29, 1992 (aged 91) Pompano Beach, Florida
- Education: University of Virginia

William H. Sebrell Jr. (September 11, 1901 – September 29, 1992) was an American nutritionist.

== Early years ==
Sebrell was born in Portsmouth, Virginia. He received a B.A. degree from the University of Virginia and then enrolled in the medical school, receiving his M.D. in 1925.

== Career ==
Sebrell joined the Public Health Service (PHS) in 1926. After completing an internship at the PHS Marine Hospital in New Orleans, Sebrell was assigned to the Hygienic Laboratory (as the National Institutes of Health was then known) in Washington, D.C.

A leading international authority on nutrition, Sebrell first recognized and described the dietary deficiency disease, ariboflavinosis, and made significant contributions to knowledge of dietary needs and deficiencies. He began his research career under Dr. Joseph Goldberger, who demonstrated that pellagra is a deficiency disease. During the 1930s, Sebrell made many contributions to knowledge of the anemias and the role of diet in cirrhosis.

During World War II, Sebrell was co-director of the National Nutrition Program, which coordinated activities of all state agencies working in nutrition. This program aided food production and the maintenance of civilian health during the war years. In 1948 he became director of the Experimental Biology and Medicine Institute, and on October 1, 1950, he was appointed director of NIH. He held this post until his resignation on July 31, 1955, amidst the Cutter Incident, a scandal relating to improper preparation of polio vaccines which resulted in children being injected with live polio virus.

Sebrell helped to formulate the first international standards of nutrition for the League of Nations and pioneered the growing acceptance of scientific nutrition as a regular function of modern state and local health departments.

Sebrell also organized Columbia University's Institute of Human Nutrition. In April 1971, he joined the staff of Weight Watchers.

== Death ==
On September 29, 1992, Sebrell died from cancer at his home town in Pompano Beach, Florida.

Government offices
Preceded by Rolla Dyer	7th Director of the National Institutes of Health; 1950 – 1955	Succeeded by James Augustine Shannon
