= Monica Bertagnolli =

American surgical oncologist (born 1959)

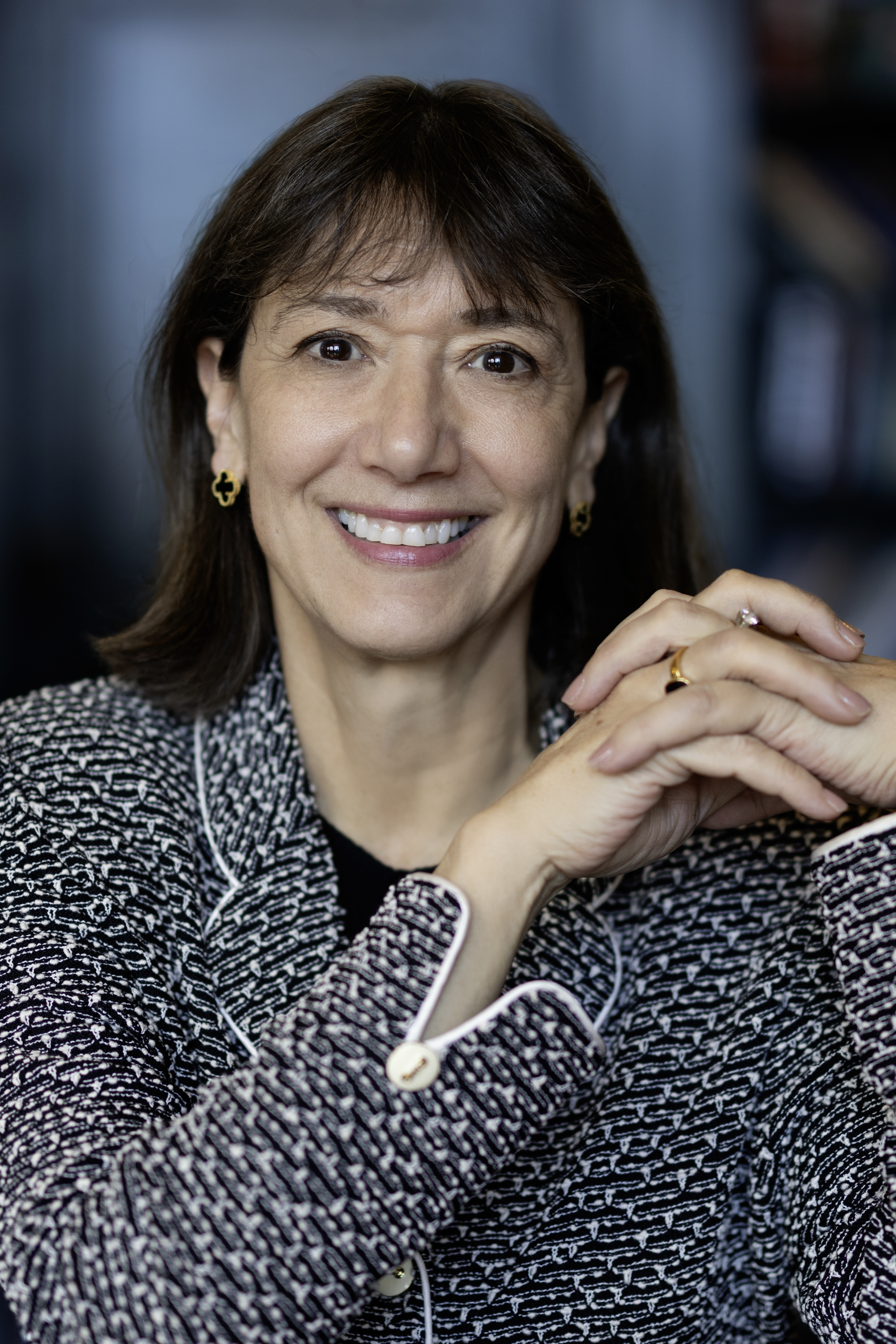
- Bertagnolli in 2026

President of the National Academy of Medicine

Personal details
- Born: 1959 (age 66–67)
- Education: Princeton University (BS); University of Utah (MD)
- Scientific career
- Fields: Surgical oncology Gastrointestinal cancer Adenomatous polyposis coli Colorectal cancer
- Workplaces: Dana–Farber Cancer Institute; Harvard Medical School; NewYork-Presbyterian Hospital

Monica M. Bertagnolli (born 1959) is an American surgical oncologist who is currently serving as president of the National Academy of Medicine. She was the 17th director of the National Institutes of Health. She previously served as the 16th director of the National Cancer Institute (NCI). Prior to her governmental positions, she worked at Brigham and Women's Hospital and Dana–Farber Cancer Institute and was the Richard E. Wilson Professor of Surgery at Harvard Medical School.

She has advocated for inclusion of rural communities in clinical studies and served as Chair of the Alliance for Clinical Trials in Oncology until her appointment to lead the NCI. Bertagnolli specializes in the treatment of tumors from gastrointestinal diseases and soft tissue sarcomas. She is the former President of the American Society of Clinical Oncology and was inducted into the National Academy of Medicine(NAM) in 2021. She was the first woman to be elected as president of the NAM. On July 1, 2026, Bertagnolli began a six-year term as president of the National Academy of Medicine, becoming the first women to hold the position.

== Early life and education ==
Bertagnolli grew up on a cattle ranch in Wyoming. Her parents were first generation Italian and French Basque immigrants. She earned a BSE in biochemical engineering from Princeton University. She studied medicine at the University of Utah School of Medicine and did her surgical residency at Brigham and Women's Hospital. She became board certified in 1993.

== Cancer research ==
In 1994, Bertagnolli began as an associate surgeon at the Strang Cancer Prevention Center and attending surgeon at NewYork-Presbyterian Hospital–Cornell. She joined the faculty at Harvard Medical School in 1999 and was appointed at Dana–Farber Cancer Institute in 2000. Bertagnolli specializes in the treatment of tumors from gastrointestinal diseases and is an expert in treating soft-tissue sarcoma. She became the Chief of Surgical Oncology at the Dana–Farber Cancer Institute in 2007, and was the first woman to hold such a position. Bertagnolli's laboratory at the Dana-Farber / Harvard Cancer Center studies the role of Adenomatous polyposis coli (APC) mutations in colorectal carcinogenesis through animal studies and human clinical trials.

=== Selected publications ===
- Sanford D Markowitz; Bertagnolli, Monica (2009). "Molecular origins of cancer: Molecular basis of colorectal cancer". The New England Journal of Medicine. 361 (25): 2449–60. doi:10.1056/nejmra0804588. PMC 2843693. PMID 20018966. Wikidata Q24617331.
- Solomon SD; McMurray JJ; Pfeffer MA; et al. (2005). "Cardiovascular risk associated with celecoxib in a clinical trial for colorectal adenoma prevention". The New England Journal of Medicine. 352 (11): 1071–80. doi:10.1056/nejmoa050405. PMID 15713944. Wikidata Q29620087.
- Itay Tirosh; Izar, Benjamin; Sanjay M Prakadan; et al. (2016). "Dissecting the multicellular ecosystem of metastatic melanoma by single-cell RNA-seq". Science. 352 (6282): 189–196. doi:10.1126/science.aad0501. PMC 4944528. PMID 27124452. Wikidata Q37094024.

== NIH director ==
In May 2023, President Biden nominated Bertagnolli to serve as the director of the National Institutes of Health. Dr. Bertagnolli was confirmed by the United States Senate on November 7, 2023. She was the second woman director of the NIH. She resigned at the end of President Biden's term.

== Awards and honors ==
Bertagnolli's awards and honors include:

- 2011 Partners Healthcare Partners in Excellence Award
- 2015 Cancer Charles H. Sanders Life Sciences Award
- 2018 Appointed President of the American Society of Clinical Oncology
- 2021 Elected to the National Academy of Medicine
- 2021 Appointed to the Board of Directors of American Cancer Society
- 2023 Recognized as one of the 100 Influential Women in Oncology by OncoDaily
- 2024 Golden Plate Award of the American Academy of Achievement

== Personal life ==
Bertagnolli is married and has two sons. After a routine mammogram, Bertagnolli received an early-stage breast cancer diagnosis in November 2022.

Government offices
Preceded by Lawrence A. Tabak; Acting	17th Director of the National Institutes of Health; 2023–2025	Succeeded by Matthew Memoli; Acting
