= Robert Stone (physician, born 1922) =

American physician

Robert S. Stone
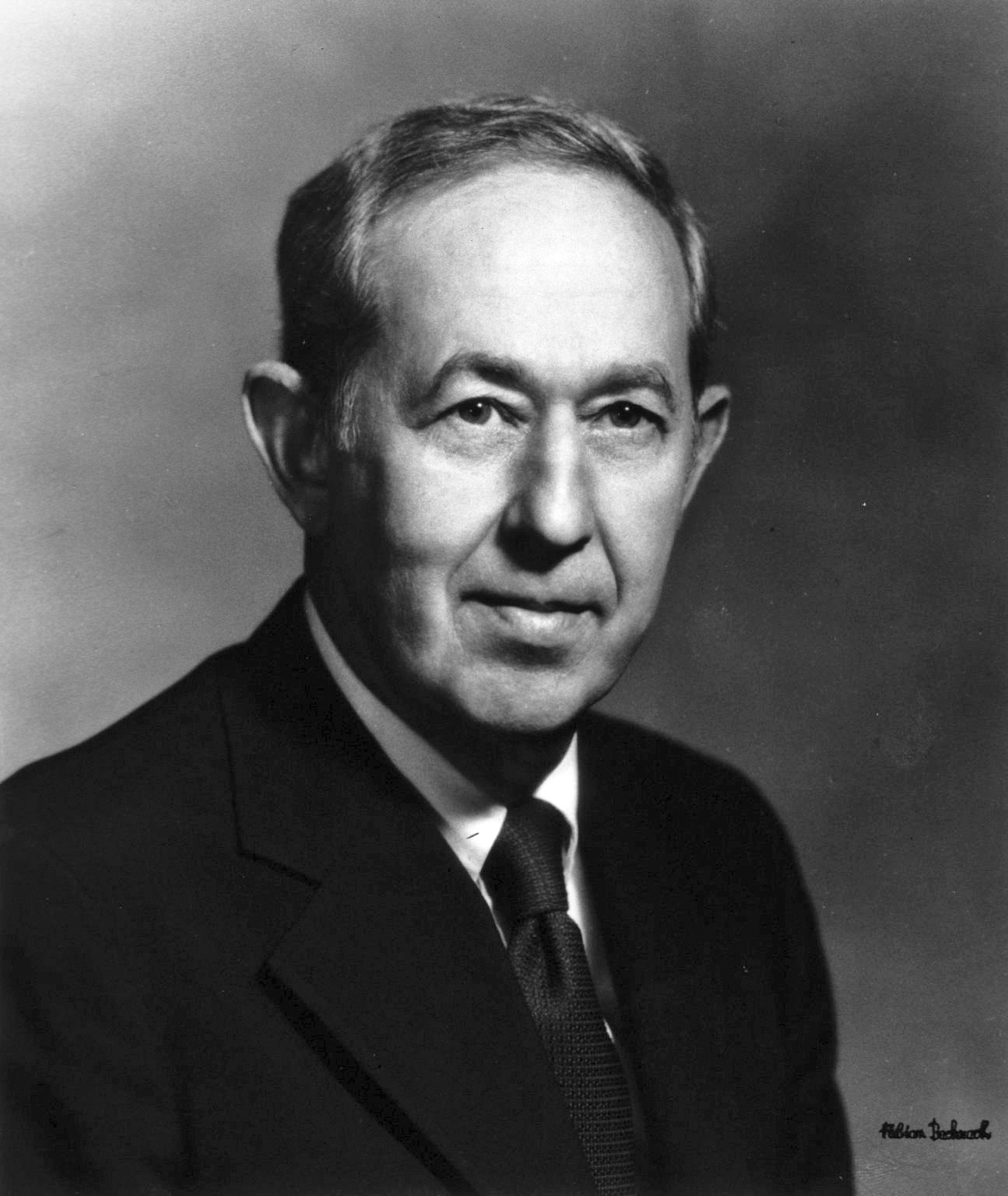

10th Director of the National Institutes of Health
- In office May 29, 1973 – January 31, 1975
- President: Richard Nixon; Gerald Ford
- Preceded by: Robert Q. Marston
- Succeeded by: Donald S. Fredrickson

Personal details
- Born: February 10, 1922 Manhattan, New York, U.S.
- Died: October 20, 2016 (aged 94) Cleveland, Ohio, U.S.
- Spouse: Mary Stone (m. 1949)
- Children: 1
- Scientific career
- Education: Brooklyn College; State University of New York Upstate Medical University
- Fields: Pathology
- Workplaces: UCLA Medical School; University of New Mexico School of Medicine; Oregon Health & Science University; Texas A&M Health Science Center College of Medicine; National Institutes of Health

Robert S. Stone (February 10, 1922 – October 20, 2016) was an American physician. He served as the Director of The National Institutes of Health from May 29, 1973, to January 31, 1975. Stone also served as the vice president for health services and dean of the school of medicine at the University of New Mexico, dean of the School of Medicine of the University of Oregon Health Sciences Center and vice president of the Health Sciences Center, and dean of the Texas A&M Health Science Center College of Medicine.

== Early years ==
Stone was born in Manhattan, New York on February 10, 1922. He received his B.A. in 1942 from Brooklyn College and his M.D. from the State University of New York Upstate Medical University in 1950.

=== Career ===
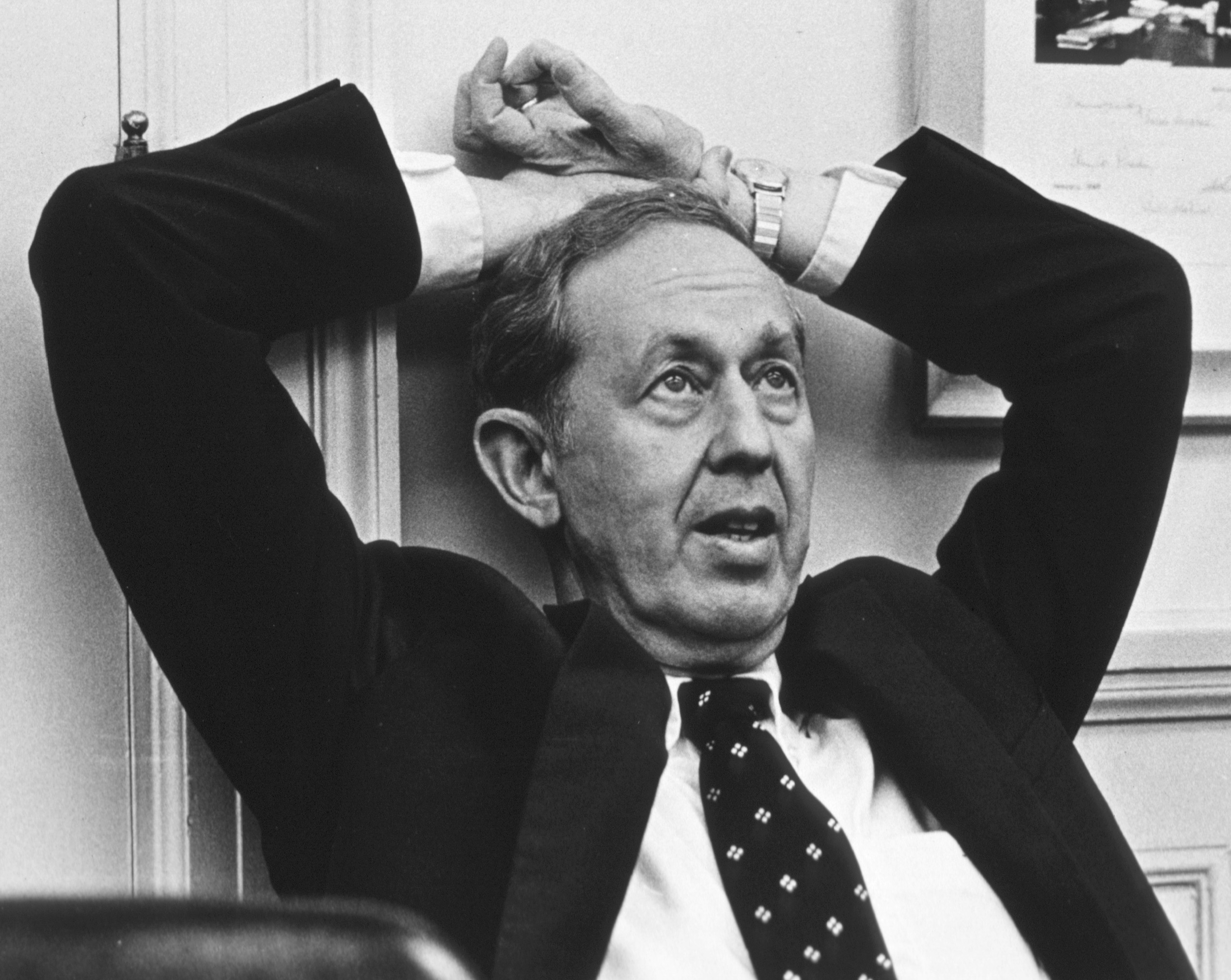
Robert Stone

Stone was an instructor in pathology at Columbia University College of Physicians and Surgeons from 1950 to 1952 while fulfilling his medical residency requirement in pathology at NewYork–Presbyterian Hospital. In 1952, Stone moved to Los Angeles and joined the faculty of UCLA's School of Medicine, department of pathology. As part of his academic duties at UCLA, Stone served as the deputy coroner at Los Angeles County Coroner's Office, and as a pathologist for the Los Angeles Shriners Hospital for Crippled Children. He also served as the chief of research in pathology for the Atomic Bomb Casualty Commission from 1959 to 1960 and a collection of his speeches is held at the National Library of Medicine. Stone also served as the vice president for health services and dean of the school of medicine at the University of New Mexico. While at the University of New Mexico, he worked to increase diversity within the school of medicine by hiring minority faculty members and appointing a woman to a key leadership role. One of his hires, Dr. Alonzo Atencio, PhD, began a high school student recruitment program. In 1972, he obtained funding from the U.S. Department of Health and Human Services – Hispanic Centers of Excellence for the Basic Sciences Enrichment Program, which provided pre-entry basic science education for incoming minority medical students. He was also dean of the School of Medicine of the University of Oregon Health Sciences Center and vice president of the Health Sciences Center, and dean of the Texas A&M Health Science Center College of Medicine.

=== Research ===
While on sabbatical as a visiting scientist at The Rockefeller Institute for Medical Research in 1959, he was credited with demonstrating by electron microscopy that the Shope papilloma virus of rabbits could be found in mature skin cells, but was undetectable, although presumed present, in younger growing cells. Stone is credited with helping to develop the idea of using a method control population to study the rates of given diseases for comparison. He was also one of the first researchers to suggest that radiation exposure increases the incidence of certain known diseases rather than creating new types.

== NIH Director ==
On May 29, 1973, Stone was nominated by President Richard Nixon to the position of Director of the National Institutes of Health. He served two years and was fired in January 1975 after he "became an advocate of medical research rather than an emissary of the HEW secretary's office, he had failed to relate the federal governments health research effort to the developing health services activities and failing to give strong direction to the NIH."

== Personal life ==
Stone was married to Mary Stone, an acclaimed artist. She had her work exhibited near Texas A&M at the Texas Gallery and also in the Reynolds Medical Building. On a regular basis, her pieces were entered into and captured awards from juried art shows around the nation.

The couple's contribution to Texas A&M University was such that the Medical Sciences Courtyard Pavilion at the Joe H. Reynolds Medical Building located on the College of Medicine College Station Campus was named in honor of Robert S. Stone, M.D. and Mary E. Stone.

Stone died on October 20, 2016, in Cleveland, Ohio.

Government offices
Preceded by Robert Q. Marston	10th Director of the National Institutes of Health; 1973 – 1975	Succeeded by Donald S. Fredrickson
