= Donald S. Fredrickson =

American medical researcher

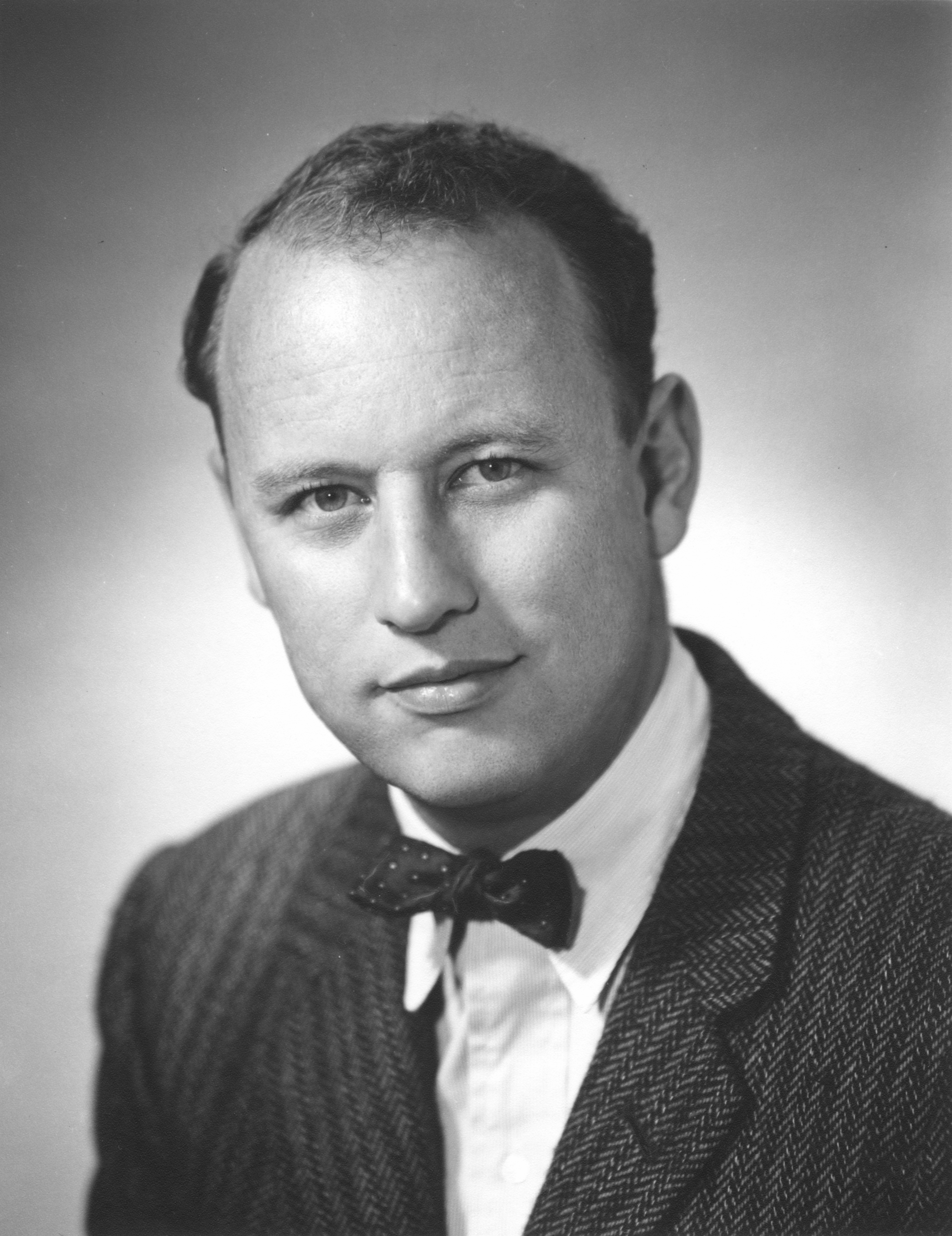
- Fredrickson in 1961

11th Director of the National Institutes of Health
- In office July 1, 1975 – June 30, 1981
- President: Gerald Ford; Jimmy Carter
- Preceded by: Robert Stone
- Succeeded by: James Wyngaarden

Personal details
- Born: Donald Sharp Fredrickson; August 8, 1924 Cañon City, Colorado
- Died: June 7, 2002 (aged 77) Bethesda, Maryland
- Scientific career
- Education: University of Michigan
- Fields: Lipid metabolism
- Workplaces: National Institutes of Health; National Academy of Sciences; Howard Hughes Medical Institute

Donald Sharp "Don" Fredrickson (August 8, 1924 – June 7, 2002) was an American medical researcher, principally of the lipid and cholesterol metabolism, and director of National Institutes of Health and subsequently the Howard Hughes Medical Institute.

== Biography ==
Fredrickson was born in Cañon City, Colorado. His father was a county judge and the owner of Fredrickson Brown, an independent insurance agency. After high school he commenced medical school at the University of Colorado, but completed his studies at the University of Michigan after being transferred there by the army. During a cycling trip in the Netherlands he met his future wife, Priscilla Eekhof, and they married two years later. They had two sons.

Between 1949 and 1952 he worked as a resident and subsequently as a fellow in internal medicine at the Peter Bent Brigham Hospital (now part of Brigham and Women's Hospital) in Boston. Much of his published work from this period is in the field of endocrinology. Subsequently he spent a year in the laboratory of Ivan Frantz, a cholesterol biochemist, at Massachusetts General Hospital.

== Lipid research ==
In 1953 he took up a post at the National Heart Institute, part of the National Institutes of Health in Bethesda, Maryland. Initially, he worked with protein chemist and Nobel laureate Christian B. Anfinsen, and subsequently (with Daniel Steinberg) developed an interest in the metabolism of cholesterol and lipoproteins, as well as related medical conditions such as Niemann-Pick disease. His group identified Tangier disease (HDL deficiency) and cholesteryl ester storage disease, two inborn errors of cholesterol metabolism. He played a prime role in the identification of several apolipoproteins (proteins that characterise the nature of a blood lipid particle): APOA2, APOC1, APOC2 and APOC3.

In 1967 Fredrickson co-authored the paper that described the classification of lipoprotein abnormalities in five types, depending on the pattern of lipoprotein electrophoresis; this became known as the Fredrickson classification. It was adopted as the mondial standard by the World Health Organization in 1972. His group also conducted the first trials of pharmacological cholesterol reduction in the prevention and treatment of cardiovascular disease.

== Textbooks ==
From 1960 he worked, with John Stanbury and James Wyngaarden, on several editions of the encyclopedic medical textbook The Metabolic and Molecular Bases of Inherited Disease.

== Directorships ==
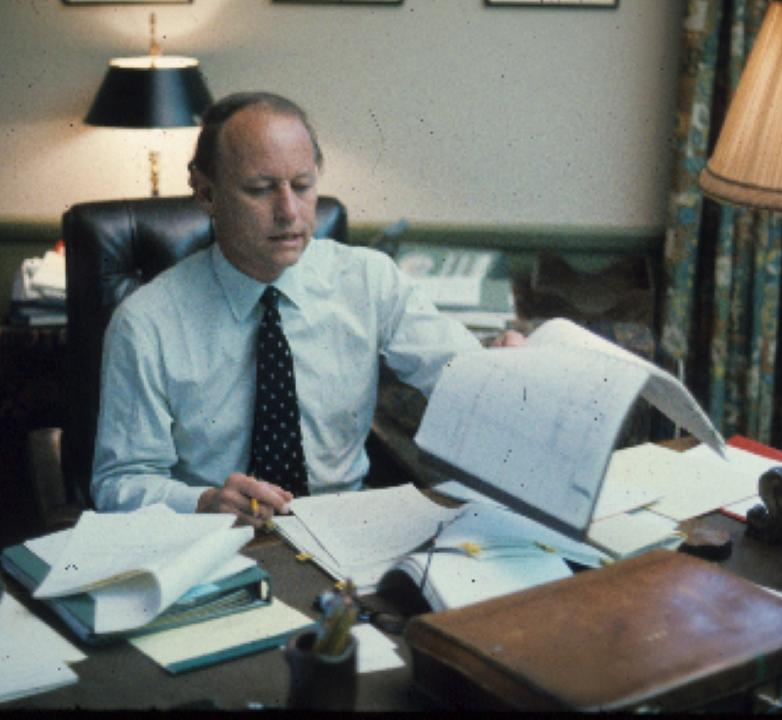
Fredrickson at NIH in 1976

Apart from his work in research, Fredrickson was involved in the management of the NHI from an early stage. He was clinical director from 1960 onward and from 1966 general director of NHI. In 1974 he left the NHI (then already the National Heart and Lung Institute) to head the Institute of Medicine of the National Academy of Sciences. Nine months later he was asked by president Gerald Ford to become head of the National Institutes of Health, a task he commenced on 1975-06-01.

One of the main issues that occupied him was the controversy over research involving recombinant DNA. Already in 1973 there had been scientists urging a ban on such research for environmental reasons. Fredrickson released a guideline that restricted release of genetically modified organisms into the environment, and called into existence a body that would advise on these matters and had to approve any NIH research involving recombinant DNA technology. Fredrickson is credited with restoring confidence in this form of research. A second controversy involved congressional control over the NIH in general. Some feel that Fredrickson's decision to resign from his position in 1981 was fuelled by these controversies. The recombinant DNA controversy was the subject of a book published by Fredrickson in 2001.

After 1981 Fredrickson was scholar-in-residence at the National Academy of Sciences for two years, but in 1983 he was recruited to become the vice-president of the Howard Hughes Medical Institute, a privately run health research charity. At that stage, the institute was still the owner of the Hughes Aircraft Company, and Fredrickson participated in the negotiations that led to the sale (for $5.2 billion) to General Motors. He made substantial changes to the institute's research programme. He resigned in 1987 when the trustees of the institute discovered that there had been financial malversations under his presidency.

== Later years ==
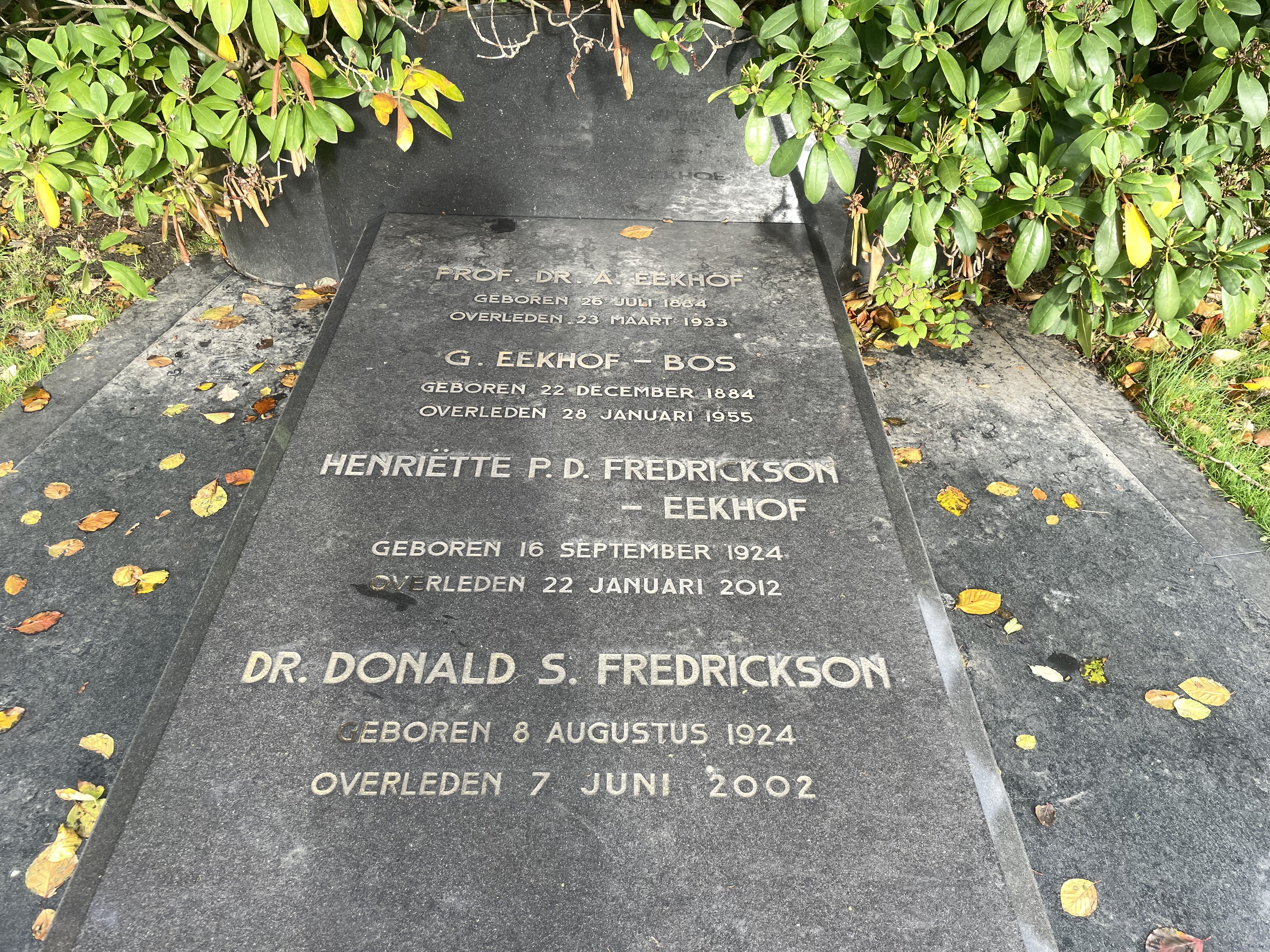
Grave of Donald S. Fredrickson (in Leiden)

Fredrickson returned to the NIH, resuming work on lipid diseases and writing for the National Library of Medicine. He participated in the genetic elucidation of Tangier disease, which he had himself described in the 1960s.

He was a member of the National Academy of Sciences, the American Academy of Arts and Sciences, and the American Philosophical Society.

He was personal physician to Hassan II of Morocco, and had a close personal friendship with the king until the latter's death in 1999.

He was found dead, face-down, in his swimming pool in 2002. He is buried in Leiden, the Netherlands.

His papers are held at the National Library of Medicine in Bethesda, Maryland.

Government offices
| Preceded by Robert Stone | 11th Director of National Institutes of Health; 1975 – 1981 | Succeeded by James B. Wyngaarden |
