= James A. Shannon =

Director of National Institutes of Health 1955–1968

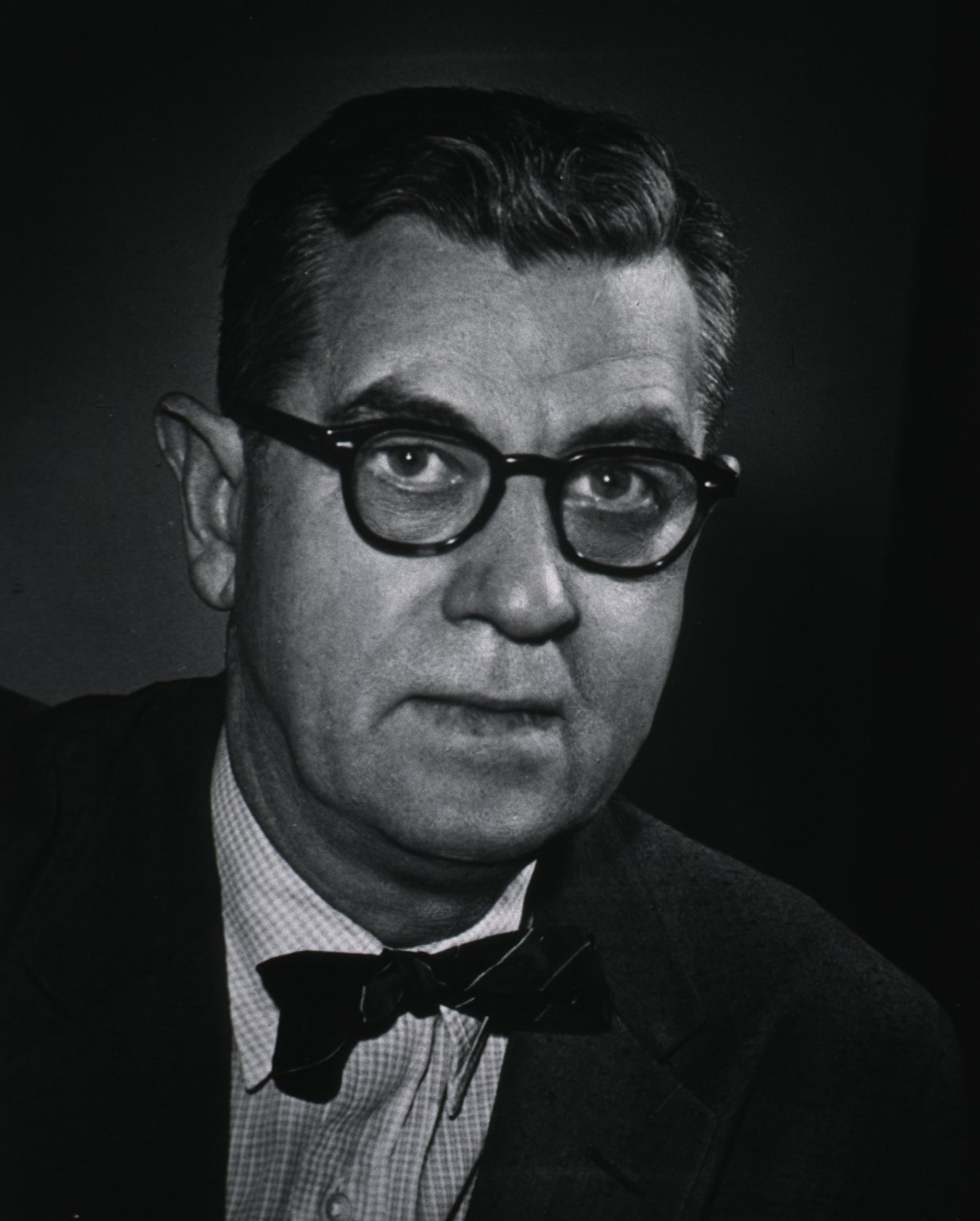

8th Director of the National Institutes of Health
- In office August 1, 1955 – August 31, 1968
- President: Dwight Eisenhower; John F. Kennedy; Lyndon Johnson
- Preceded by: William H. Sebrell, Jr
- Succeeded by: Robert Q. Marston

Personal details
- Born: August 9, 1904 New York City, U.S.
- Died: May 20, 1994 (aged 89) Baltimore, Maryland, U.S.
- Spouse: Alice M. Waterhouse
- Children: 2
- Education: College of the Holy Cross (BA); New York University (MD, PhD)
- Scientific career
- Awards: Public Welfare Medal (1962); President's Award for Distinguished Federal Civilian Service (1966); National Medal of Science (1974)
- Fields: Nephrology
- Institutions: National Institutes of Health
- Thesis: The Renal Excretion of Creatinine in Man (1935)

James Augustine Shannon (August 9, 1904 – May 20, 1994) was an American nephrologist and physiologist who served as the director of National Institutes of Health (NIH) from August 1, 1955 to August 31, 1968. In 1962 he was awarded the Public Welfare Medal from the National Academy of Sciences, of which he was a member. He was elected to the American Academy of Arts and Sciences in 1965 and the American Philosophical Society in 1967. A collection of his papers is held at the National Library of Medicine in Bethesda, Maryland.

== Early life and education ==
Shannon was born in New York City on August 9, 1904. He attended Brooklyn Preparatory School and graduated from the College of the Holy Cross in Worcester, Massachusetts, with a Bachelor of Arts in 1925. He then earned his Doctor of Medicine (M.D.) and his Ph.D. in physiology from New York University in 1929 and 1935, respectively.

== Scientific research ==
Shannon's early scientific work was in renal physiology and clinical nephrology. Beginning in the early 1930s at New York University, he conducted quantitative studies of kidney function at a time when understanding of renal physiology was still developing.

His work contributed to the development of precise methods for measuring glomerular filtration rate and for analyzing tubular reabsorption and secretion in a variety of species, including humans. Using glomerular filtration rate as a reference standard, he investigated the mechanisms of passive reabsorption, active transport, and tubular secretion, including studies of glucose transport limits and the excretion of compounds such as phenol red. He also examined the mechanisms of tubular water transport and the influence of antidiuretic hormone on renal function.

During World War II, Shannon redirected his research toward the urgent national effort to develop effective antimalarial therapies. As chair of the Panel on Clinical Trials of the national malaria research program, he supervised clinical pharmacology and therapeutic trials of candidate antimalarial drugs. His work helped establish quantitative methods for evaluating antimalarial efficacy in human subjects and contributed to the identification and clinical use of drugs such as quinacrine (Atabrine) and chloroquine. For his contributions to wartime malaria research, he was awarded the Presidential Medal of Merit in 1948.

== Leadership of the National Institutes of Health ==
Shannon became director of the National Institutes of Health (NIH) in 1955, following his service as associate director for research and his leadership during the federal response to the 1955 polio vaccine crisis. He served as director until 1968 under Presidents Dwight D. Eisenhower, John F. Kennedy, and Lyndon B. Johnson.

During his thirteen-year tenure, NIH underwent a period of rapid expansion. According to the New York Times, the NIH budget increased at an average rate of about 20 percent per year, reaching nearly $1.4 billion by the time of his retirement. Shannon's NAS Biographical Memoir reports that the NIH budget grew from approximately $65 million in 1955 to about $1.3 billion in 1968.

Shannon promoted the expansion of both intramural and extramural research programs. Under his leadership, the Health Research Facilities Construction Act of 1956 provided federal funds for the construction and modernization of biomedical research facilities at universities and medical schools across the United States. NIH training programs were expanded and reoriented to emphasize scientific research, including the establishment of research career development awards and, in 1964, the Medical Scientist Training Program for combined M.D.-Ph.D. education.

Additional organizational changes occurred during his directorship, including the creation or reorganization of several NIH institutes and divisions and the transfer of the National Library of Medicine to NIH in 1968. By the time of his retirement, NIH had become the world’s largest sponsor of biological and medical research.

== Later career ==
Shannon retired from the National Institutes of Health in 1968 upon reaching the Public Health Service’s statutory retirement age. He subsequently served as a scholar in residence at the National Academy of Sciences from 1968 to 1970.

In 1970 he joined Rockefeller University as professor of the biomedical sciences and special assistant to its president. He later held emeritus status at Rockefeller.

From 1976 to 1980, Shannon served as a scholar in residence at the National Library of Medicine. During this period and afterward, he continued to write and lecture on biomedical research policy and the relationship between federal government and academic science.

Government offices
Preceded by William H. Sebrell, Jr	8th Director of National Institutes of Health; 1955 – 1968	Succeeded by Robert Q. Marston
