= Lewis Ryers Thompson =

American physician

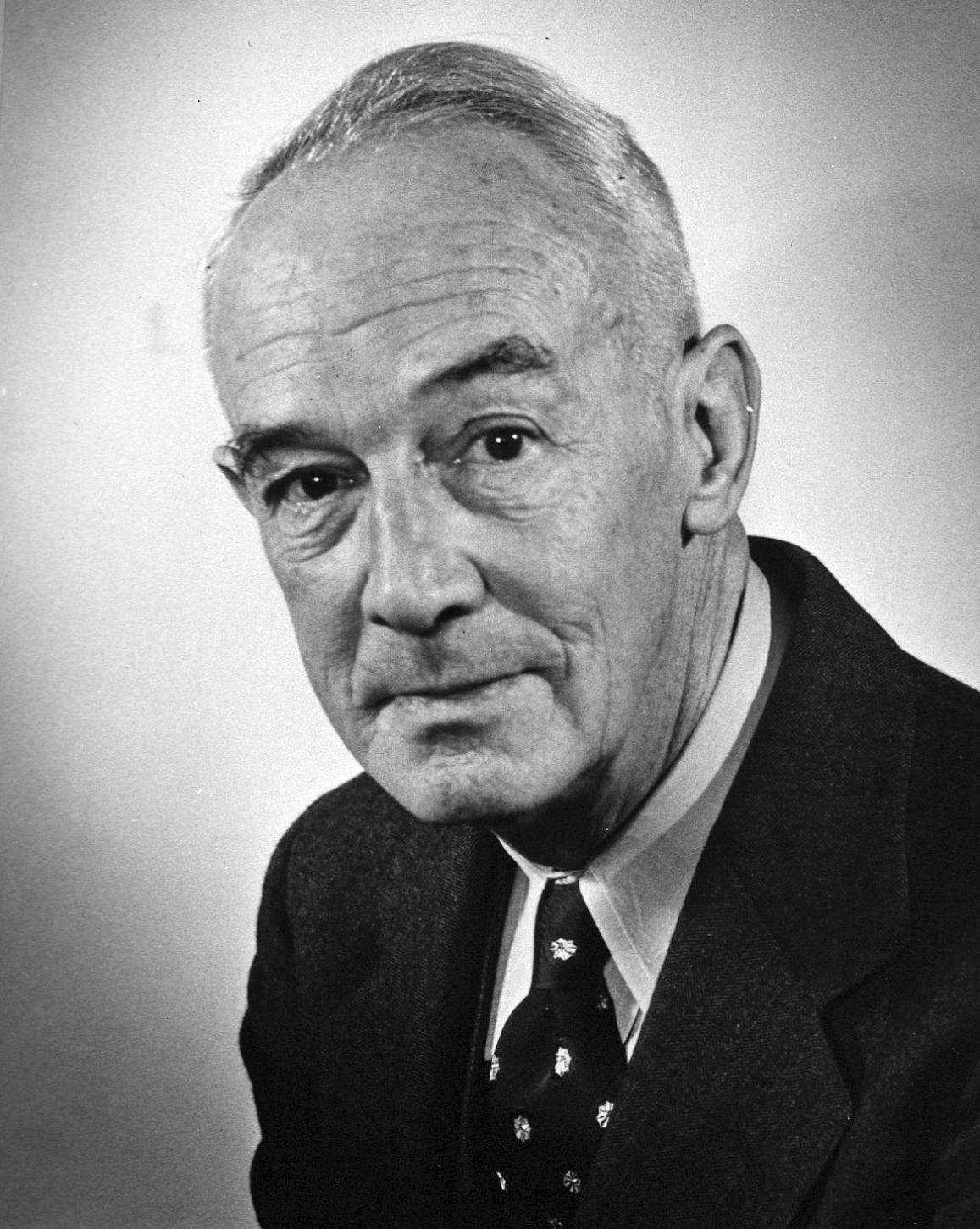

5th Director of the National Institutes of Health
- In office February 1, 1937 – January 31, 1942
- President: Franklin D. Roosevelt
- Preceded by: George Walter McCoy
- Succeeded by: Rolla Dyer

Personal details
- Born: August 6, 1883 Lafayette, Indiana, U.S.
- Died: November 12, 1954 (aged 71) Baltimore, Maryland, U.S.
- Resting place: Arlington National Cemetery
- Scientific career
- Education: Louisville Medical College
- Fields: Public health
- Workplaces: National Institute of Health; Public Health Service

Lewis Ryers Thompson (August 6, 1883–November 12, 1954) was an American physician who served as Assistant Surgeon General of the United States and as Director of the National Institutes of Health.

== Early life and education ==
Thompson was born on 6 August 1883 in Lafayette, Indiana. He completed his MD degree at Louisville Medical College (later absorbed into the University of Louisville), after which he took a position with the Philippine Constabulary.

== Public Health Service ==
Thompson began his career with the United States Public Health Service in 1910, with an appointment as an assistant surgeon. Thompson first gained his reputation through a 1916 epidemiological study of polio in New York City. He became Chief of the PHS Office of Industrial Hygiene and Sanitation in 1921.

He rose through the ranks of the agency, and by 1930 was the chief of the Division of Scientific Research. In this position, he performed field investigations on a range of public health issues, from childhood nutrition and dental issues to industrial hygiene and stream pollution. He was also appointed Assistant Surgeon General in 1930, a position he would hold until his retirement in 1946.

Apart from his medical and administrative skills, Thompson demonstrated shrewd political talents. He had arranged to slip the future Surgeon General Thomas Parran Jr. onto the 1932 subcommittee of the Science Advisory Committee, against the wishes of the National Academy of Sciences (Parran was not a member). He also used his many connections to learn of a large tract of land which had been offered as a gift to the government, which no agency had accepted; this land would become the new home of the NIH.

=== Building the new NIH ===
When the Division of Scientific Research was merged with Hygienic Laboratory to form the NIH in 1930, Thompson was chosen to be the director of the consolidated agency. Thompson had a vision for a greatly expanded role for the National Institutes of Health, which clashed with the more conservative positions of his predecessors, including his immediate predecessor George W. McCoy. He oversaw the move of the NIH to its current site in Bethesda, Maryland, having been the primary mover behind securing funding for the first six buildings. With his old ally Thomas Parran, Thompson assisted in the establishment of the National Cancer Institute as part of the Public Health Service.

=== Later career ===
Thompson stepped down as director on January 31, 1942, but continued to work with the Public Health Service for several years. From 1943 until his retirement, he was associate chief, and then chief, of the agency's Bureau of State Services. During World War II and its aftermath, he was chief of the Medical Division of the United States Strategic Bombing Survey in Japan. He retired from the Public Health Service in late 1946.

== After the Public Health Service ==
After his retirement, Thompson took a position as a scientific director for the Rockefeller Foundation's international health division. He died on 12 November 1954 at the Baltimore Public Health Service Hospital and was buried at Arlington National Cemetery.

Government offices
Preceded by George W. McCoy	5th Director of National Institutes of Health; 1937 – 1942	Succeeded by Rolla Dyer
