= George Walter McCoy =

American physician

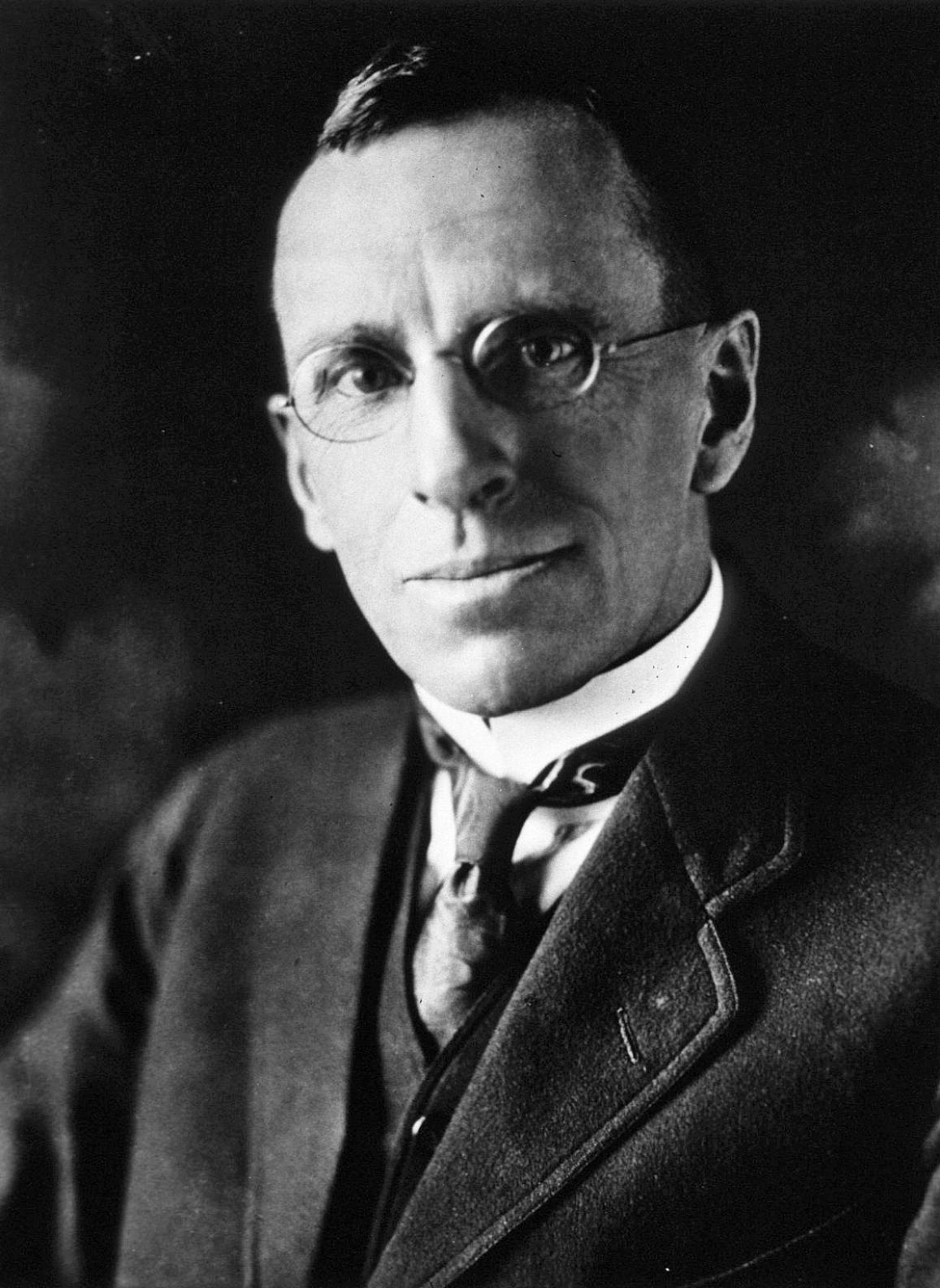

4th Director of the National Institutes of Health
- In office November 20, 1915 – January 31, 1937
- President: Woodrow Wilson; Warren G. Harding; Calvin Coolidge; Herbert Hoover; Franklin D. Roosevelt
- Preceded by: John Fleetezelle Anderson
- Succeeded by: Lewis Ryers Thompson

Personal details
- Born: 1876 Cumberland Valley, Pennsylvania, U.S.
- Died: April 2, 1952 (aged 75–76)
- Scientific career
- Education: University of Pennsylvania School of Medicine
- Known for: Leprosy
- Fields: Infectious diseases
- Workplaces: Public Health Service; National Institute of Health; Louisiana State University School of Medicine

George Walter McCoy (1876–1952) was an American physician. An international expert on leprosy, he served as director of the National Institute of Health for more than twenty years.

== Early life and education ==
McCoy was born in 1876 in the Cumberland Valley of Pennsylvania. He was the son of Osborn George McCoy and his wife Lavanda Walters, and had one sibling, J. Ross McCoy, who died young in 1899. He graduated from the University of Pennsylvania School of Medicine in 1898 and completed his internship at City Hospital in Newark, New Jersey.

== Career ==
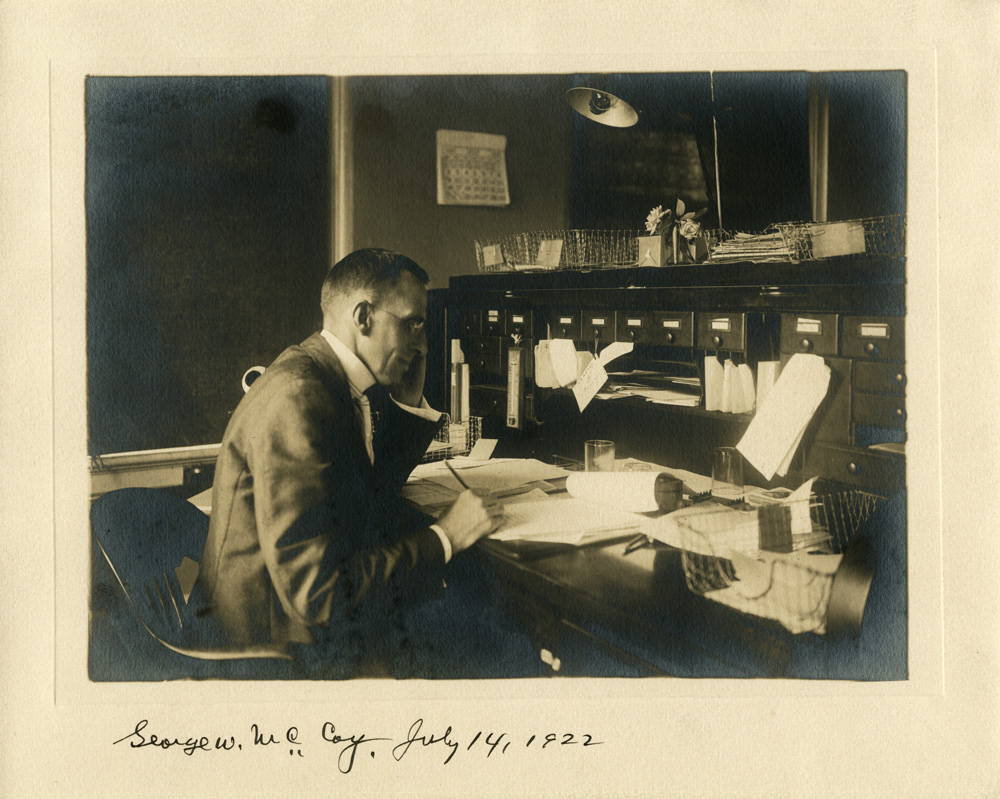
McCoy in 1922

After completing his internship, McCoy joined the United States Public Health Service and was assigned to the U.S. Marine Hospital in San Francisco, California. While stationed in San Francisco, he became the director of the U.S. Plague Laboratory in 1908, and during his time there he discovered, and later isolated the pathogen responsible for, a "plague-like disease of rodents", later dubbed tularemia. In 1911, he was transferred to direct the U.S. Leprosy Investigation Station in Hawaii. In 1915, he was appointed the fourth head of the U.S. Hygienic Laboratory, which was renamed the National Institute of Health in 1930.

McCoy directed the NIH for more than twenty years, during which the agency expanded significantly. Apart from his administrative role, he continued to conduct major medical studies on a variety of diseases, and advocated a combined field and laboratory approach to public health research. He resigned his position as director in early 1937, but remained with the Public Health Service to conduct a large, nationwide survey on leprosy. In 1938, he left the PHS and joined the staff of the Louisiana State University School of Medicine in New Orleans, where he headed the Department of Preventive Medicine and Public Health until his retirement in 1948. He died on 2 April 1952.

== Awards and honors ==
McCoy served as president of the American Association of Immunologists from 1922 to 1923. He was made an honorary member of Delta Omega in 1930. He was awarded the American Public Health Association's Sedgwick Memorial Medal in 1931.

Government offices
Preceded by John F. Anderson	Director of National Institutes of Health; 1915 – 1937	Succeeded by Lewis R. Thompson
