= James Wyngaarden =

American physician (1924–2019)

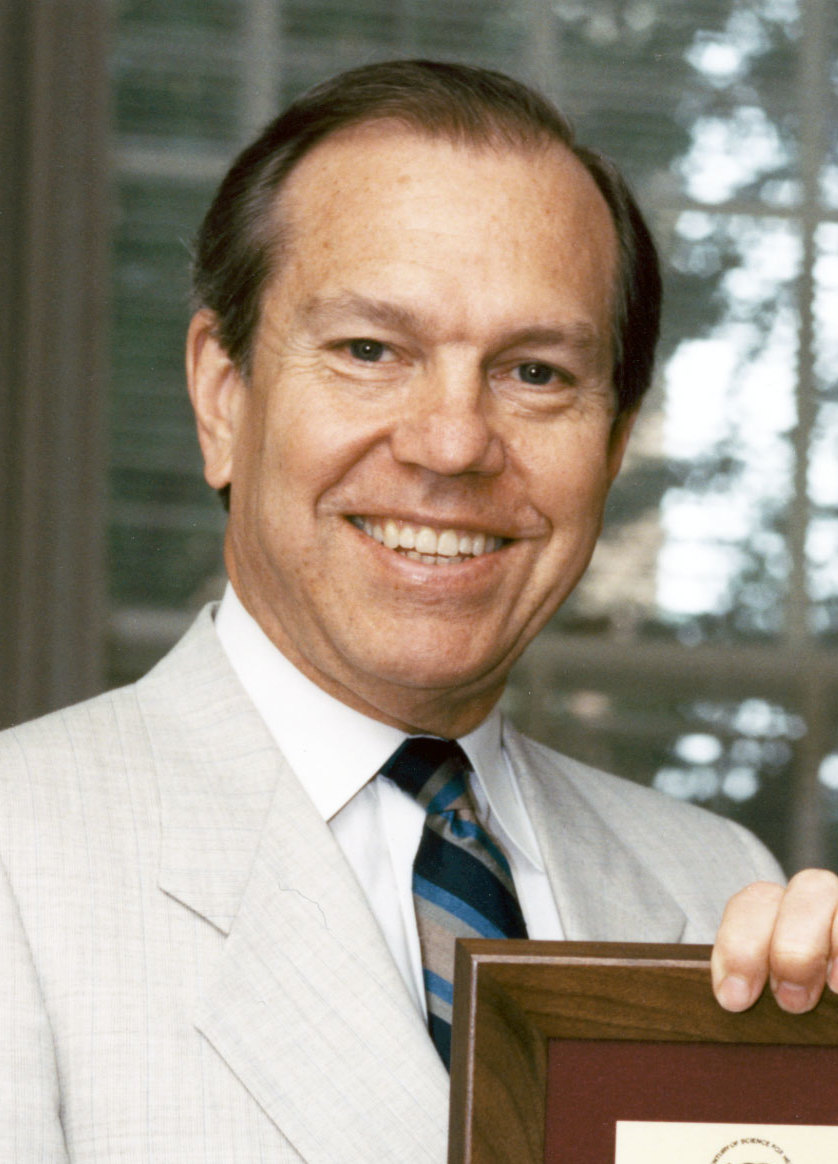
- Wyngaarden in 1987

12th Director of the National Institutes of Health
- In office April 29, 1982 – July 31, 1989
- President: Ronald Reagan; George H. W. Bush
- Preceded by: Donald Fredrickson
- Succeeded by: Bernadine Healy

Personal details
- Born: James Barnes Wyngaarden; October 19, 1924 Grand Rapids, Michigan
- Died: June 14, 2019 (aged 94) Durham, North Carolina
- Scientific career
- Education: Calvin University; Western Michigan University; University of Michigan Medical School
- Fields: purine biosynthesis and the genetics of gout
- Workplaces: National Institutes of Health; Duke University School of Medicine; University of Pennsylvania

James Barnes Wyngaarden (October 19, 1924 – June 14, 2019) was an American physician, researcher and academic administrator. He was a co-editor of Cecil Textbook of Medicine, one of the leading internal medicine texts, and served as director of National Institutes of Health between 1982 and 1989.

== Biography ==
Wyngaarden attended Calvin College and Western Michigan University before graduating first in his class from the University of Michigan Medical School in 1948.

He trained in internal medicine at the Massachusetts General Hospital and did postdoctoral work at the Public Health Research Institute of the City of New York under DeWitt Stetten, Jr. After serving as research associate at NIH from 1953 to 1956, he moved to Duke University and in 1959 became director of the medical research training program there as well as associate professor of medicine and biochemistry. In 1961 he became professor of medicine and associate professor of biochemistry at Duke University.

Wyngaarden served as the 12th director of National Institutes of Health from April 1982 to July 1989. After his tenure, he became an Associate Director at the Office of Science and Technology Policy.

Wyngaarden was a member of the Royal Swedish Academy of Sciences.

== Personal life ==
He had four daughters and one son.

Government offices
Preceded by Donald Fredrickson	12th Director of National Institutes of Health; 1982 – 1989	Succeeded by Bernadine Healy
