= Matthew Memoli =

American physician-scientist and infectious disease researcher

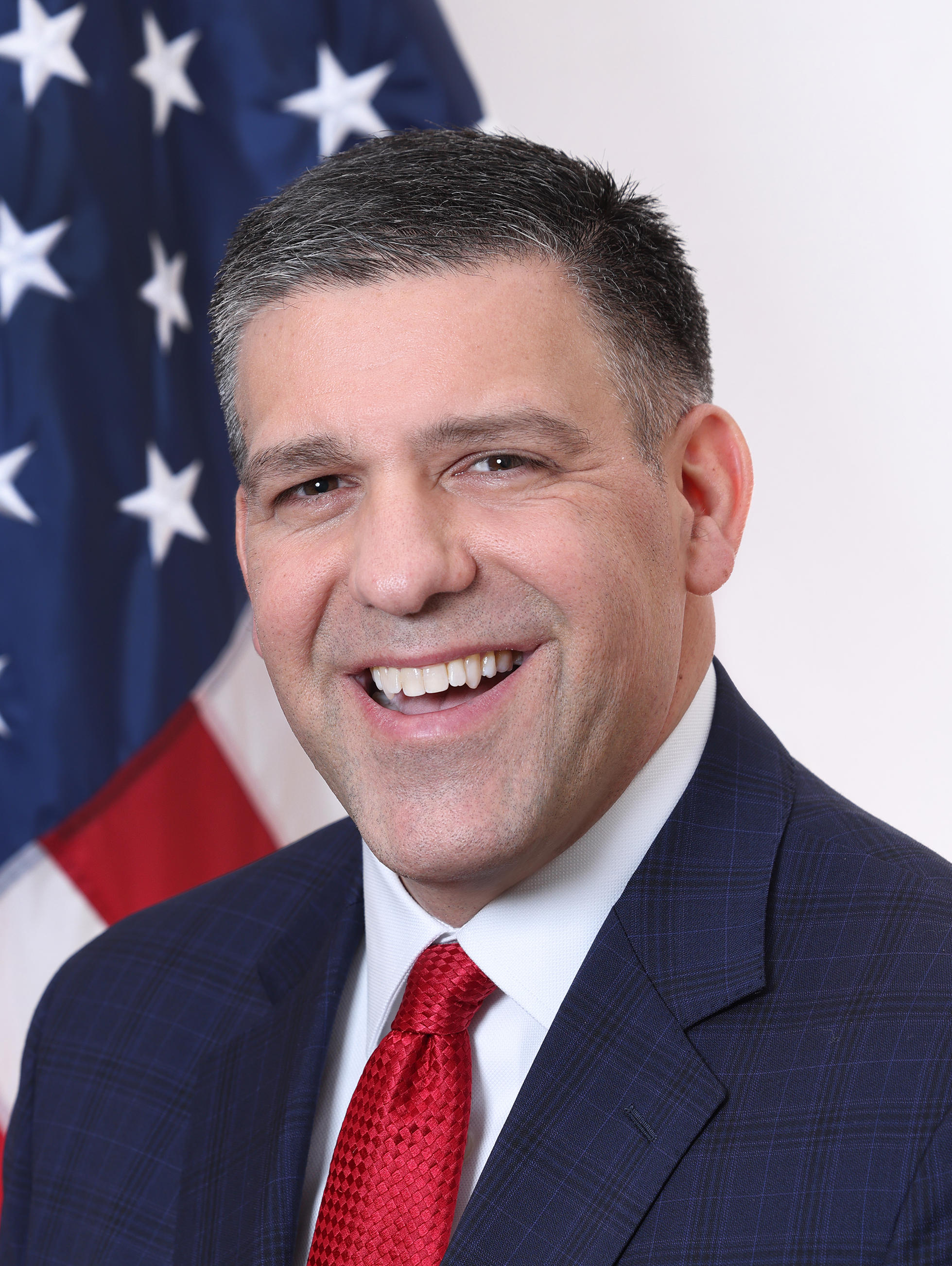
- Official portrait, 2025

Principal Deputy Director of the National Institutes of Health
- Incumbent
- Assumed office April 1, 2025
- Preceded by: Lawrence A. Tabak

Director of the National Institutes of Health
- Acting; January 22, 2025 – March 31, 2025
- President: Donald Trump
- Deputy: Lawrence A. Tabak
- Preceded by: Monica Bertagnolli
- Succeeded by: Jay Bhattacharya

Personal details
- Education: College of William & Mary (BA); Thomas Jefferson University (MS); St. George's University (MD)
- Scientific career
- Fields: Infectious diseases
- Institutions: National Institute of Allergy and Infectious Diseases

Matthew J. Memoli is an American physician-scientist and infectious disease researcher who had served as the acting director of the National Institutes of Health (NIH). He was the director of the Laboratory of Infectious Diseases (LID) Clinical Studies Unit in the National Institute of Allergy and Infectious Diseases (NIAID).

== Education ==
Matthew J. Memoli graduated from the College of William & Mary with an undergraduate degree. He earned a M.S. in microbiology from Thomas Jefferson University in 1998.

Memoli obtained a M.D. in 2002 from St. George's University School of Medicine. Following medical school, he completed a residency in internal medicine at the MedStar Washington Hospital Center via Georgetown University School of Medicine. He completed a fellowship in infectious diseases at the National Institute of Allergy and Infectious Diseases (NIAID) at the National Institutes of Health (NIH).

== Career ==
Memoli joined NIAID, where he established a clinical and translational research program focused on influenza and respiratory viruses. He serves as the director of the Laboratory of Infectious Diseases (LID) Clinical Studies Unit, located at the National Institutes of Health campus in Bethesda, Maryland. His research includes studies on human influenza pathogenesis, respiratory viruses, influenza transmission, and broadly protective vaccines.

In 2011, under Memoli's leadership, the LID Clinical Studies Unit revived influenza healthy volunteer challenge studies in the United States after a decade-long hiatus. The unit developed the first FDA-approved H1N1 influenza challenge virus and has been instrumental in developing validated models for influenza research and the evaluation of new vaccines and therapeutics. Memoli has conducted human challenge studies to better understand influenza pathogenesis, correlates of protection, and predictors of severe disease. Recent efforts include studies on universal influenza vaccines and emerging viral infections like Dengue, Zika, and Leishmaniasis.

In 2021, Memoli gained attention for his opposition to COVID-19 vaccine mandates within the NIH. He argued that population-level vaccination strategies could impede the development of natural immunity and favored targeted vaccination for high-risk groups. Memoli participated in an ethics debate on vaccine mandates hosted by the NIH in December 2021.

On January 22, 2025, Memoli was appointed acting director of the NIH by the Trump administration. During his direction in early 2025, the NIH suffered from confusion regarding details of purchasing and conducting research. On February 7, 2025 his office issued a notice on capping the indirect cost rate at 15%. For some universities this corresponds to more than a 75% decrease from the current rate. Several states have subsequently sued the NIH, arguing that "Without relief from NIH’s action, these institutions’ cutting-edge work to cure and treat human disease will grind to a halt."

Government offices
Preceded by Monica Bertagnolli	Director of the National Institutes of Health; Acting; 2025	Succeeded by Jay Bhattacharya
