= Rolla Dyer =

American physician (1886–1971)

Rolla Eugene Dyer
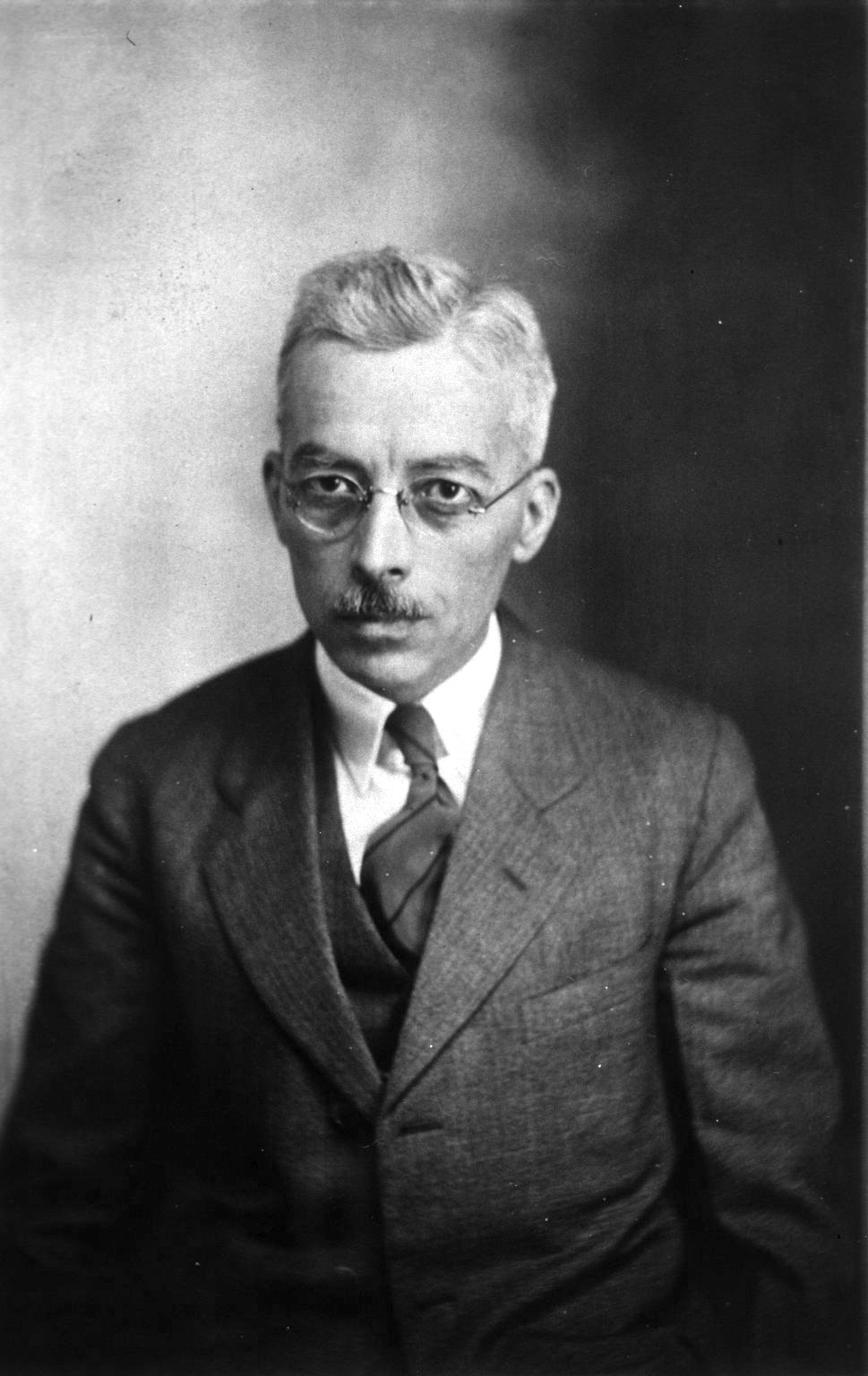

6th Director of the National Institutes of Health
- In office February 1, 1942 – September 30, 1950
- President: Franklin D. Roosevelt; Harry S. Truman
- Preceded by: Lewis R. Thompson
- Succeeded by: William H. Sebrell, Jr

Personal details
- Born: November 4, 1886 Delaware County, Ohio
- Died: June 7, 1971 (aged 84) Atlanta, Georgia
- Scientific career
- Education: Kenyon College; University of Texas
- Fields: Infectious disease research
- Workplaces: U.S. Public Health Service; National Institutes of Health; Emory University School of Medicine

Rolla Eugene Dyer (November 4, 1886 – June 3, 1971) was an American physician born in Delaware County, Ohio. Dyer received his B.A. in 1907 from Kenyon College in Gambier, Ohio, and his M.D. in 1914 from the University of Texas. He joined the U.S. Public Health Service in 1916. He was one of the first scientists to link cigarette smoking with lung cancer.

His first assignment involved fieldwork on bubonic plague in New Orleans. Five years later he joined the staff of the U.S. Hygienic Laboratory, became chief of the Division of Infectious Diseases in 1936, and director of National Institutes of Health from 1942 until his retirement in 1950. An expert in infectious diseases, he demonstrated how endemic typhus is spread and is noted for developing a vaccine to protect against the disease. In 1950 he was awarded the Walter Reed Medal from the American Society of Tropical Medicine and Hygiene.

As director of NIH, Dr. Dyer organized the Division of Research Grants, assisted in planning the Clinical Center, and helped establish three new institutes: the National Heart Institute, the National Institute of Dental Research, and National Institute of Mental Health. He also served as a member of the scientific board of directors of the International Health Division of the Rockefeller Foundation and as director of research at Emory University until 1957.

He died in Atlanta on June 3, 1971.

His papers are held at the National Library of Medicine.

Government offices
Preceded by Lewis R. Thompson	Director of National Institute of Health; 1942 – 1948	Position abolished
New title	Director of National Institutes of Health; 1948 – 1950	Succeeded by William H. Sebrell, Jr
