= Robert Q. Marston =

American physician (1923–1999)

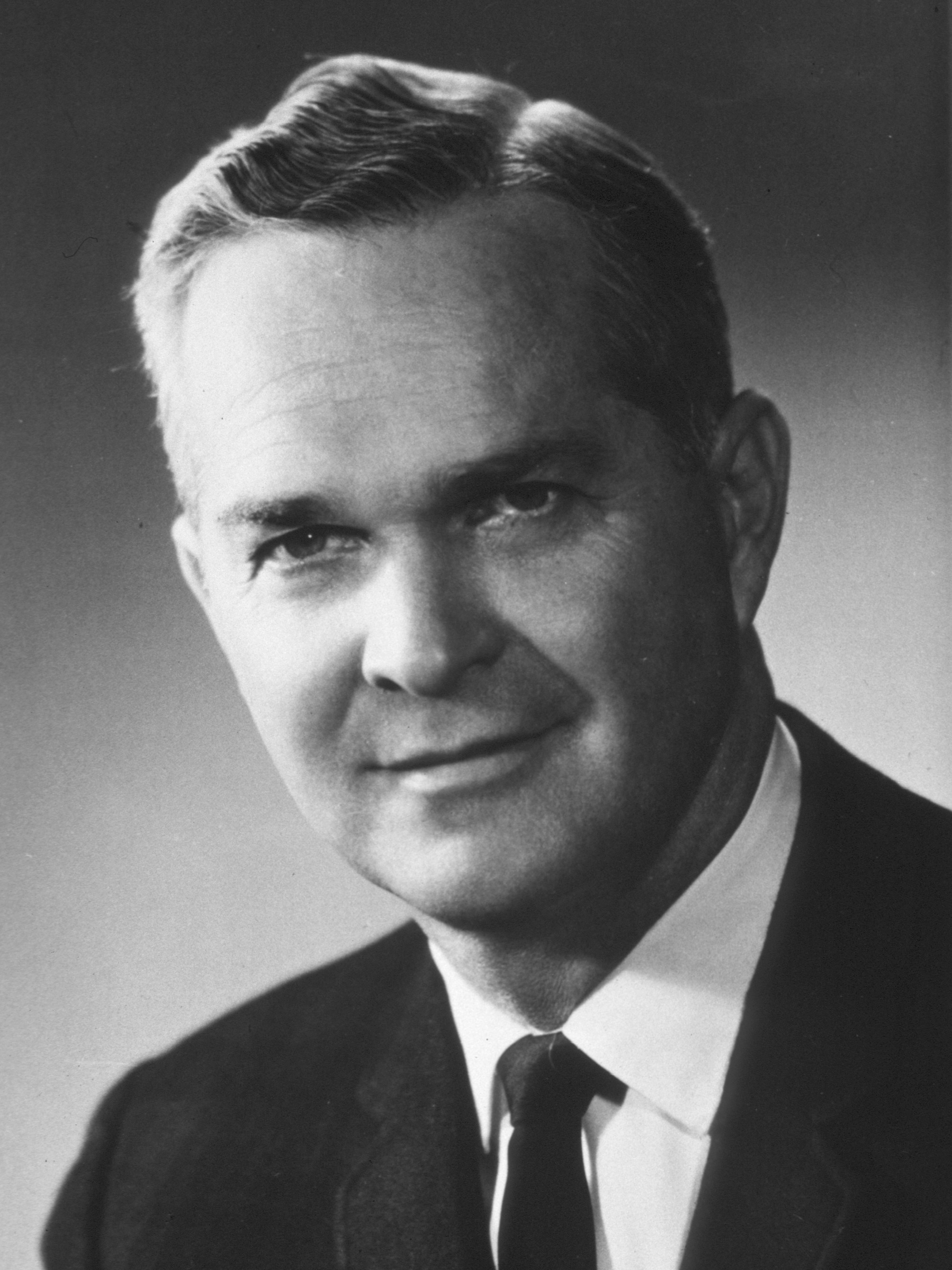

7th President of the University of Florida
- In office 1974–1984
- Preceded by: Stephen C. O'Connell
- Succeeded by: Marshall Criser

9th Director of the National Institutes of Health
- In office September 1, 1968 – January 21, 1973
- President: Lyndon Johnson; Richard Nixon
- Preceded by: James Augustine Shannon
- Succeeded by: Robert S. Stone

Personal details
- Born: February 12, 1923 Toano, Virginia, U.S.
- Died: March 14, 1999 (aged 76) Gainesville, Florida, U.S.
- Spouse: Ann Carter Garnett Marston
- Children: 3
- Education: Virginia Military Institute (BS); Medical College of Virginia (MD); Lincoln College, Oxford (BSc)
- Occupation: Medical Doctor; Research Scientist; University President
- Scientific career
- Fields: Infectious diseases
- Workplaces: National Institutes of Health; Medical College of Virginia; University of Minnesota; University of Mississippi; University of Florida

Robert Quarles Marston (February 12, 1923 – March 14, 1999) was an American physician, research scientist, governmental appointee and university administrator. Marston was a native of Virginia, and, after earning his bachelor's, medical and research degrees, he became a research scientist and medical professor. He served as the dean of the University of Mississippi School of Medicine, the director of the National Institutes of Health, and the president of the University of Florida.

== Early life and education ==
He was born in Toano, Virginia, a small unincorporated community in James City County near Williamsburg, in 1923, the fifth child of Dandridge Warren Marston and Helen Virginia Smith Marston. He graduated from the Virginia Military Institute (VMI) in Lexington, Virginia with a bachelor of science degree in 1944. While attending the Medical College of Virginia (MCV) in Richmond, Virginia, he married Ann Carter Garnett in 1946. Following his graduation from MCV with a doctor of medicine degree (M.D.) in 1947, he received a Rhodes Scholarship to attend the University of Oxford in Oxford, England. While studying at Oxford's Lincoln College, Marston worked under Nobel Prize-winner Howard Florey, Norman Heatley and other scientists from the research team that developed penicillin as the first antibiotic, and graduated with a degree in research science.

== Scientist, administrator, educator ==
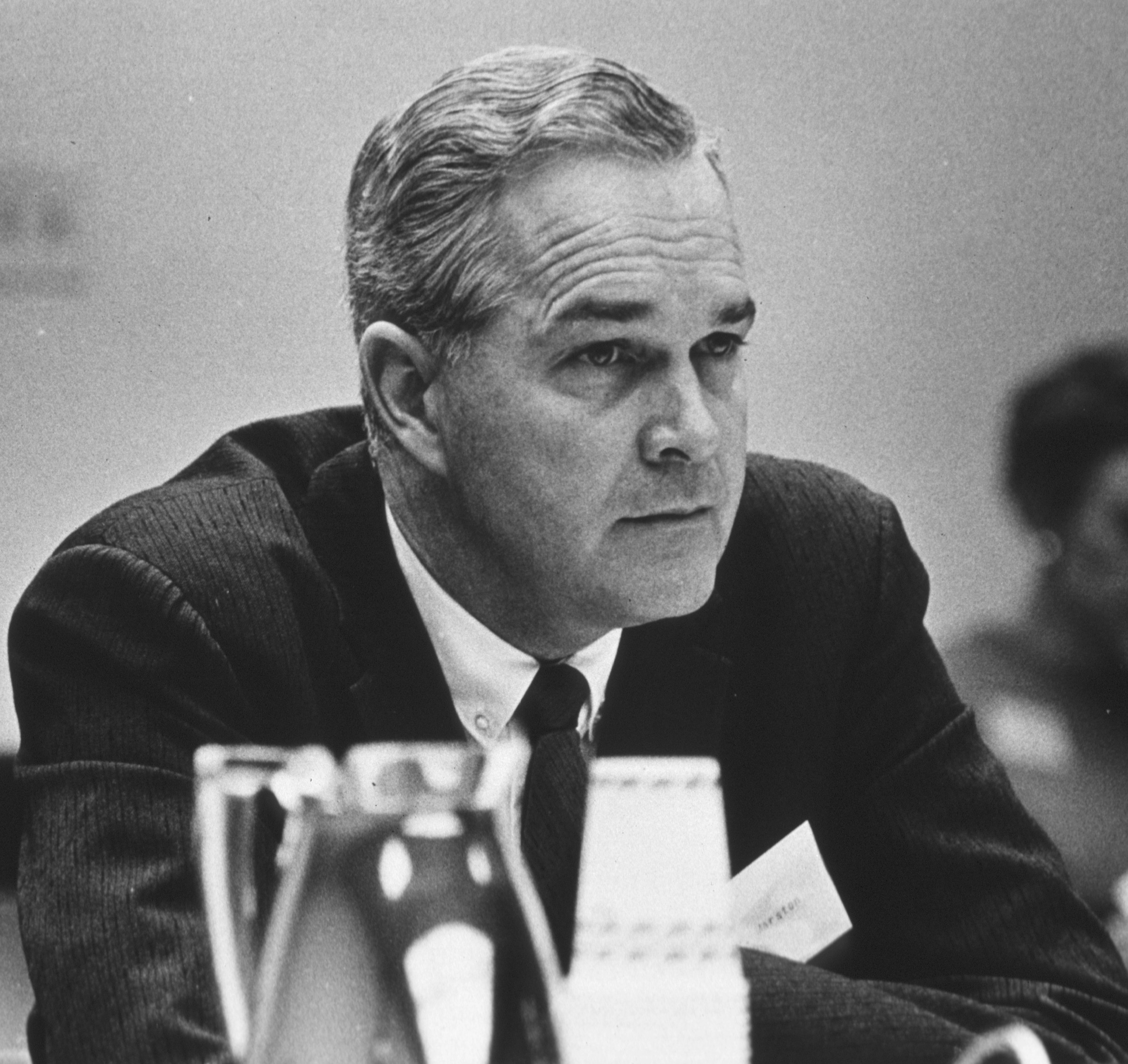
Robert Q. Marston

After completing his internship at Johns Hopkins Hospital in Baltimore, Maryland, and a one-year residency at Vanderbilt University Hospital in Nashville, Tennessee, Marston joined the National Institutes of Health (NIH) as a medical researcher with the Armed Forces Special Weapons Project, examining the infectious after-effects of whole-body irradiation, from 1951 to 1953. He finished his residency at MCV in 1954.

The Markle Foundation awarded Marston a grant as a "gifted practitioner" in the furtherance of his academic medical career. Thereafter, he taught for three years on the MCV faculty, and lectured at the University of Minnesota's Medical School for a year as an assistant professor of bacteriology and immunology. He rejoined MCV in 1959, as the assistant student affairs dean and an associate medical professor.

Marston was chosen to be the dean of the University of Mississippi's School of Medicine and director of the university's Medical Center in Jackson, Mississippi in the midst of the Civil Rights Movement in 1961. Marston was hired with the tacit understanding that he would integrate the medical school and medical center to comply with Federal law and maintain the medical school's accreditation. Under his politically understated guidance, and in the face of continued political opposition from Mississippi Governor Ross Barnett, his administration admitted the first African-American medical students, hired the first black medical professor, integrated the medical center's patients, and set new precedents for the non-violent racial desegregation of Southern medical schools and teaching hospitals. Later, in 1965, he was chosen to be the university's vice-chancellor.

He rejoined the NIH in 1966, first as NIH associate director and the director of the fledgling Regional Medical Programs Division, charged with cancer, heart disease and stroke research. Then, during an April 1968 internal reorganization of NIH, he was selected to be the new administrator of the Health Services and Mental Health Administration. Only five months later, in September, Marston was chosen to be the NIH director.

During his last year as the NIH director, Marston became embroiled in a funding controversy with the Nixon administration, which wanted to place greater funding emphasis on a "war on cancer". Marston believed that emphasizing one disease at the expense of other medical research was bad policy, and continued to support balanced, comprehensive funding priorities. He eventually resigned from NIH in April 1973, after nearly five years as director. Afterward, he became a scholar-in-residence at the University of Virginia in Charlottesville, Virginia. The National Academy of Sciences' Institute of Medicine named him as its inaugural distinguished fellow.

In 1974, the Florida Board of Regents chose Marston as the seventh president of the University of Florida located in Gainesville, Florida; he undertook the presidency during a time of economic recession, state budget cuts and increased demand for private funding of the university. During his ten-year tenure, the university matured into one of the United States' ten largest single-campus universities and one of the five most inclusive in the scope of its academic programs, with significant growth in its sponsored research activities, and notable advancement of the university's academic excellence and reputation. Marston's accomplishments as university president included the organization of a non-profit corporate structure for the management of Shands Hospital, helping establish the State of Florida's Eminent Scholars Program, dramatically increasing the university's private financial support, developing plans to recruit National Merit Scholars and National Achievement Scholars, and laying the organizational foundation for the University of Florida's eventual membership in the Association of American Universities (AAU).

After retiring as the University of Florida president emeritus in 1984, Marston returned to the Virginia Military Institute as a distinguished scholar, and later served on VMI's governing Board of Visitors during the controversy over the court-ordered admission of women. In 1985, he went back to the University of Florida faculty and conducted research and presented papers for the university's Department of Fisheries and Aquatic Sciences and its College of Medicine, co-edited The Medical Implications of Nuclear War on behalf of the National Academy of Sciences, and served as the chairman of the Safety Advisory Committee for the Clean-Up of Three Mile Island. He also accepted the chairmanship of the Florida Marine Fishery Commission, tasked with the governance of the state's saltwater fishing industry and guardianship of its resources.

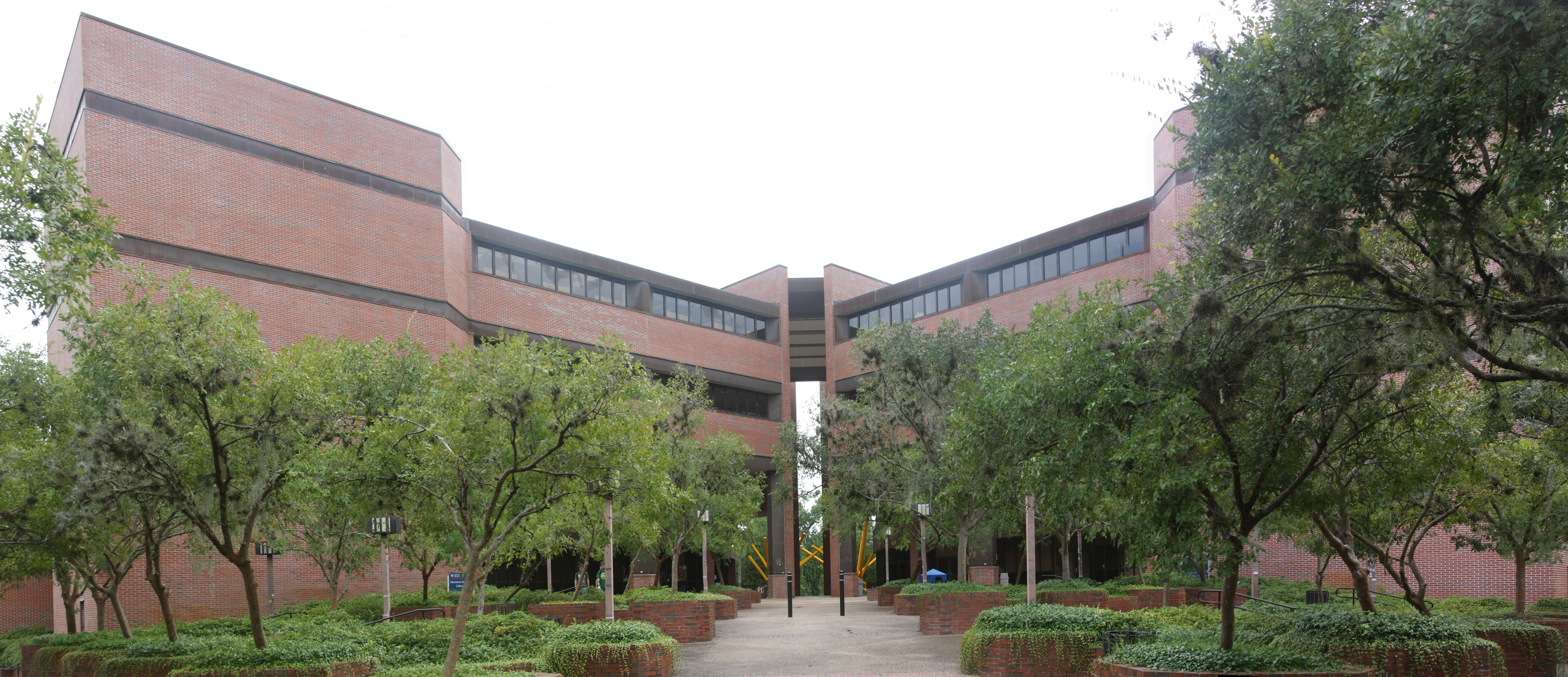
The Marston Science Library, named for Robert Q. Marston, the seventh president of the University of Florida (1974–84). The building was completed and occupied in 1987, and is the home of the university's collections in agriculture, biological sciences, chemical and physical sciences, engineering, mathematics, and statistics.

As a well-known leader in several national medical organizations and university associations, Marston was elected leader of the National Association of State Universities and Land Grant Colleges, an Association of American Medical Colleges Distinguished Service Member, and a member of the board of governors of the Institute of Medicine. He was also appointed to the corporate boards of the Hospital Corporation of America, Johnson & Johnson, and Wackenhut.

== Legacy ==
Marston is prominently remembered for his role in desegregating the University of Mississippi medical school, his stewardship of the National Institutes of Health, and his advancement of the academic reputation and standing of the University of Florida. In recognition of his prior work as a medical research scientist and his success in promoting the University of Florida as a major national research university, the Florida Legislature dedicated the university's new Marston Science Library in his name in 1987.

Marston died in Gainesville, Florida, on March 14, 1999; he was 76 years old. His daughter, two sons, and six grandchildren survived him. His wife, Ann Carter Garnett Marston, died the previous year; they were married for fifty-one years.

== See also ==
- History of Florida
- History of the University of Florida
- List of Oxford University people
- List of Rhodes Scholars
- List of University of Florida presidents
- List of Virginia Military Institute alumni

== Bibliography ==
- McGuigan, James W., "Robert Quarles Marston, M.D. 1923–1999," Transactions of the American Clinical & Climatological Association, vol. 116, p. lx (2005).
- Pleasants, Julian M., Gator Tales: An Oral History of the University of Florida, University of Florida, Gainesville, Florida (2006). ISBN 0-8130-3054-4.
- Proctor, Samuel, & Wright Langley, Gator History: A Pictorial History of the University of Florida, South Star Publishing Company, Gainesville, Florida (1986). ISBN 0-938637-00-2.
- Quinn, Janis, Promises Kept: The University of Mississippi Medical Center, University Press of Mississippi, Jackson, Mississippi (2005). ISBN 1-57806-805-3.
- Van Ness, Carl, & Kevin McCarthy, Honoring the Past, Shaping the Future: The University of Florida, 1853–2003, University of Florida, Gainesville, Florida (2003).

Government offices
| Preceded by James Augustine Shannon | 9th Director of the National Institutes of Health; 1968 – 1973 | Succeeded by Robert S. Stone |
Academic offices
| Preceded by Stephen C. O'Connell | 7th President of the University of Florida; 1974 – 1984 | Succeeded by Marshall Criser |
