= Pascal J. Goldschmidt =

American cardioloigst

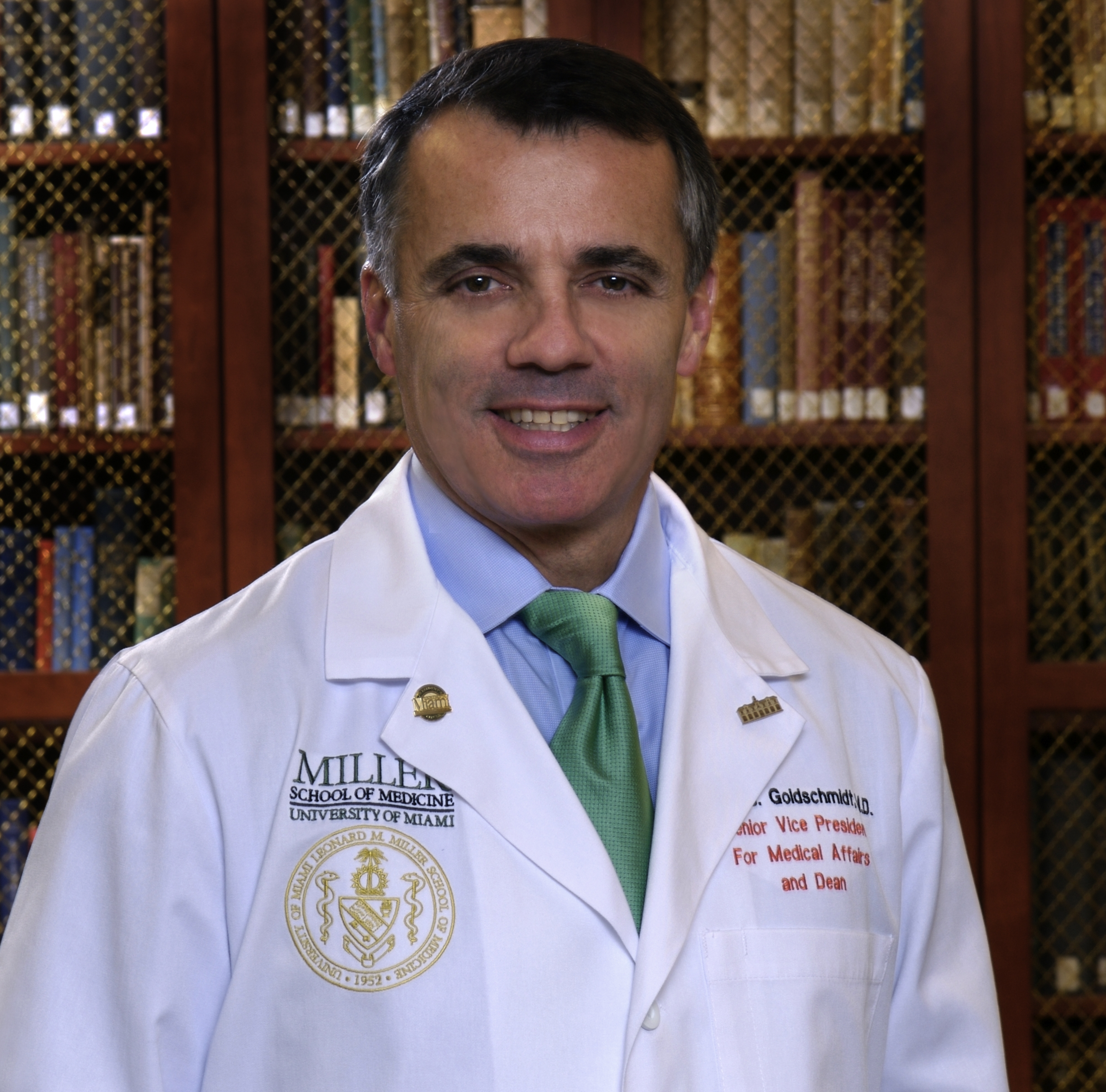
Goldschmidt in February 2011

Pascal J. Goldschmidt-Clermont is a Belgian-American cardiologist and cardiovascular researcher, and former dean of the Miller School of Medicine at the University of Miami. Until January 2016, he also was chief executive officer of the University of Miami Health System (UHealth), which includes six hospitals and outpatient facilities in Miami-Dade, Broward, Palm Beach, Monroe, and Collier counties.

== Early life and education ==
A native of Belgium, Goldschmidt received his medical degree from the Université libre de Bruxelles and completed residency and fellowship training in Brussels at Erasmus Hospital and at Johns Hopkins University in Baltimore, Maryland.

== Career ==
Following his training at Johns Hopkins University, he was an associate professor in the university's Department of Cell Biology and Anatomy, Department of Pathology, and Division of Cardiology in the Department of Medicine until 1997.

Until 2000, Goldschmidt was director of cardiology at Ohio State University College of Medicine and Public Health, where he built the Heart and Lung Research Institute and a heart hospital.

Goldschmidt joined the Duke University Medical Center in 2000, as chief of the Division of Cardiology, then as chair of the Department of Medicine.

Goldschmidt joined the University of Miami in April 2006, and in November 2007 oversaw the purchase of Cedars Medical Center, which is now the University of Miami Hospital, the flagship hospital of UHealth. Following the layoff of 800 employees in June 2012, this rapid expansion was reported to be a contributing factor to Miller Medical School's financial troubles. Since 2006, the research center has also seen the creation of the John P. Hussman Institute for Human Genomics and the Interdisciplinary Stem Cell Institute.

New global health clinical and research initiatives during Goldschmidt's term at Miami included the Global Institute for Community Health and Development and the International Medicine Institute. The former institute played a key role in the medical relief effort in Haiti after the January 2010 earthquake. A team of Miller School physicians, nurses and staff was the first to arrive in Port-au-Prince, and within nine days of the earthquake the University of Miami Hospital in Haiti was open and treating patients.

== Awards and recognition ==
In October 2008, Goldschmidt received the inaugural Jay and Jeanie Schottenstein Prize in Cardiovascular Sciences from the Ohio State University Heart and Vascular Center, awarded biennially for recognized work in the clinical sciences of cardiovascular medicine, cardiothoracic surgery, or the basic sciences of molecular or cellular cardiology.

Goldschmidt's research applies genomics and cell therapy to the prevention, diagnosis and treatment of coronary artery disease. His studies involve Reactive oxygen species, Inflammation, Small GTP-Binding Proteins, hypertrophy, hypertension and atherosclerosis.

== Controversy ==
=== Conflict of interest allegations ===
Goldschmidt helped establish the University of Miami's public database disclosing conflicts of interest for all faculty at the Miller School of Medicine. However, the information in the database ceased to be updated after December 2011. An article evaluating public disclosure of outside income by medical school deans reported that Goldschmidt did not publicly disclose stock options from OPKO and MEDNAX, two companies where he was on the board of directors in 2009. In a 2010 proxy statement, MEDNAX disclosed that until September 2009, Dr. Medel, the company's chief executive officer, was on the Trustee Services Committee for the University of Miami and participated in setting performance goals and annual bonus allocations for University of Miami employees, including Goldschmidt. It was claimed that the 2010 version of the reporting system did not allow the disclosure of unexercised stock options from the period from 1 June 2010 to 31 May 2011, an option which was later added in the 2011 version. Goldschmidt's income of $1,713,300 and $605,658 from sale of MEDNAX stocks on 9 May 2014 and 9 March 2015 respective remains undisclosed.

Further conflict of interest allegations arose in 2010, when Goldschmidt hired psychiatrist Charles Nemeroff as chair of psychiatry, one year after Nemeroff had been ousted from the same role at Emory University after a probe led by Senator Charles Grassley revealed he had failed to declare at least US$1.2 million in income from drug companies. From 1 June 2010 to 31 December 2011, Goldschmidt's outside income from being on boards of directors was reported as: $50,001-$100,000 from Health Management Associates, $50,001-$100,000 from MEDNAX, over $200,000 from OPKO Health and $10,001-$25,000 from the scientific advisory board at Synecor. Goldschmidt's salary was $1,072,117 in 2009–2010, $1,312,960 in 2010-2011 and $1,447,160 in 2011–2012.

=== Faculty Senate Committee ===
In August 2012, the University of Miami Faculty Senate Ad Hoc committee on medical issues presented its report to Donna Shalala, then president of the University of Miami, and to Dean Pascal Goldschmidt. The committee reported that senior faculty members and high level administrators they had interviewed reported a widespread fear of the administration due to retaliations against faculty who criticized the administration. Interviewees also told the committee that staff reductions had negatively impacted the Miller School faculty's ability to deliver care and to conduct basic and clinical research, and that the pressure to produce clinical income was discouraging and devaluing research, reducing morale, and compromising the academic environment. The committee recommended a formal senate resolution to urge the Miller School and its Faculty Council to address the destructive effects of the absence of a collegial environment.

In January 2013, the Miami Herald reported that around 700 of the 1,200 faculty at the University of Miami Miller School of Medicine had signed a petition complaining about the school's leadership. A copy of the petition obtained by the Herald criticized the "failed leadership" of Goldschmidt and chief operating officer Jack Lord, stating that "We want to make clear that the faculty has lost confidence in the ability of these men to lead the school." In a ballot conducted by the university in 2013, a majority of faculty at the Miller School voted against Goldschmidt remaining as Dean, but were overruled by the university's president, Donna Shalala, who decided to retain him.
