= John F. Anderson (scientist) =

Third director of the United States Hygienic Laboratory

John Fleetezelle Anderson
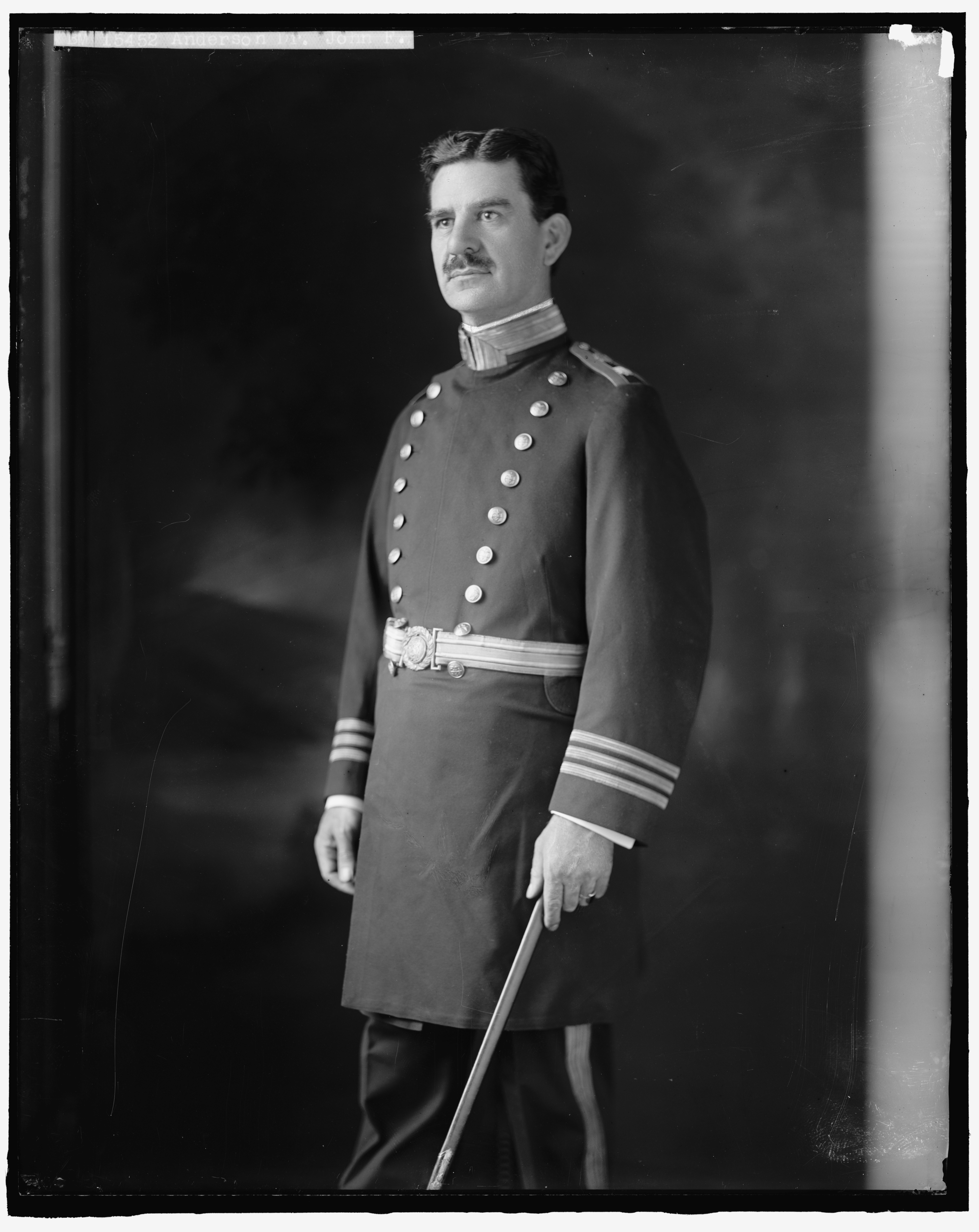

3rd Director of the U.S. Hygienic Laboratory
- In office October 1, 1909 – November 19, 1915
- President: William Howard Taft; Woodrow Wilson
- Preceded by: Milton J. Rosenau
- Succeeded by: George W. McCoy

Personal details
- Born: March 14, 1871 Fredericksburg, Virginia, US
- Died: September 29, 1958 (aged 87) New Brunswick, New Jersey, US
- Scientific career
- Education: University of Virginia
- Known for: Rocky Mountain spotted fever, measles transmission
- Fields: Medical research, disease transmission
- Workplaces: Marine Hospital Service; U.S. Hygienic Laboratory; E. R. Squibb & Sons

John Fleetezelle Anderson (March 14, 1871 – September 29, 1958) was the third director of the United States Hygienic Laboratory, the precursor to the National Institutes of Health, from October 1, 1909 to November 19, 1915.

== Early life and education ==
Anderson was born in Fredericksburg, Virginia, on March 14, 1871. He later studied medicine and received his M.D. degree in 1895 from the University of Virginia. After graduating he studied bacteriology abroad in Vienna, Paris, and the Liverpool School of Tropical Medicine.

== Career ==
Upon returning to the US in 1898, Anderson joined the Marine Hospital Service. In 1902, he was made assistant director of the Hygienic Laboratory, and in 1909, he became the director. He resigned in 1915 to become the director of the Research and Biological Laboratories and later vice president of E. R. Squibb & Sons.

Anderson is noted for his research. He is considered an early expert in Rocky Mountain spotted fever. He developed an experimental measles model in rhesus monkeys with Joseph Goldberger.

In honor for his work on Rocky Mountain spotted fever, a species of wood tick, Dermacentor andersoni, was named in his honor in 1908.

In 1955, the University of Virginia established the John F. Anderson Memorial Lectureship in his honor.

Anderson died from heart disease in New Brunswick, New Jersey, on September 29, 1958.

Government offices
Preceded by Milton J. Rosenau	Director of the Hygienic Laboratory; 1909 – 1915	Succeeded by George W. McCoy
