= Milton J. Rosenau =

American public health official

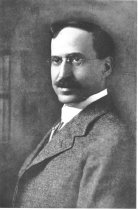

2nd Director of the U.S. Hygienic Laboratory
- In office May 1, 1899 – September 30, 1909
- President: William McKinley; Theodore Roosevelt
- Preceded by: Joseph J. Kinyoun
- Succeeded by: John F. Anderson

Personal details
- Born: Milton Joseph Rosenau; January 1, 1869 Philadelphia, Pennsylvania, U.S.
- Died: April 9, 1946 (aged 77) Chapel Hill, North Carolina, U.S.
- Scientific career
- Education: University of Pennsylvania
- Fields: Infectious diseases
- Workplaces: U.S. Hygienic Laboratory; Harvard University

Milton Joseph Rosenau (January 1, 1869 – April 9, 1946) was an American public health official and professor who was influential in the early twentieth century.

== Early life ==
Milton Joseph Rosenau was born in 1869 in Philadelphia, Pennsylvania, to Nathan Rosenau and Mathilde Blitz, German Jewish emigrants. After obtaining his degree from the University of Pennsylvania in 1889, he joined the United States Marine Hospital Service. After working for a few years under the supervision of Joseph Kinyoun, Rosenau began his ascent into positions of greater authority.

== Camp Jenner ==
Having been promised land by the Mexico-based Tlahuialila Company, about one thousand African Americans migrated across the Texas Mexican border. After finding conditions there far worse than what they had been promised, most decided to migrate back to the United States. In returning and crossing the border through Eagle Pass, they brought back with them a smallpox epidemic. This caused a health crisis at the border. Unwelcome amongst the inhabitants of Eagle Pass, the three hundred or so migrants were placed in a distant and ill-cared for camp just north of the Rio Grande River. After Texas officials sought help from the surgeon general, Rosenau was sent in to manage the camp as a hospital.

Upon arriving, Rosenau named the encampment as Camp Jenner, in honor of Edward Jenner, the British physician responsible for the first smallpox vaccine. In addition to treating smallpox and preventing its spread, Rosenau was charged with testing a new smallpox vaccine upon the migrants. Due to the potential of the quarantine generating political controversy, Rosenau helped to justify the endeavor, taking photographs that emphasized the happiness of the camp's residents as well as the capable control exercised by doctors and camp guards. Scholars are divided on the success of Rosenau's leadership at Camp Jenner. While some claim Rosenau helped avoid a much larger disaster, more recently, historian John Mckiernan-Gonzalez has suggested that Rosenau's use of the untested vaccine possibly could have caused the deaths of several patients.

== Angel Island ==
After Camp Jenner, Rosenau relocated to California to work as an assistant surgeon at the Angel Island. He stayed in this role for two years. In 1898, Rosenau left, subsequently serving as the director of the National Hygienics Laboratory, and as a quarantine officer at the Philippine Islands and Santiago. In 1901, he succeeded Joseph Kinyoun as the director of the Hygienic Laboratory at the Angel Island. In this role, Rosenau studied the quality of various vaccines being sold on the market, and found a significant variation in terms of their purity. This led him to publish a report that influenced many physicians and members of the public to call for more government supervision in the manufacturing of vaccines.

== Milk ==
Rosenau has been described as a contentious campaigner to make milk safe in the United States. He aimed to reduce milkborne diseases and stated that "next to water purification, pasteurization is the most important single preventive measure in the field of sanitation."

Rosenau authored The Milk Question in 1912 which provided arguments supportive of pasteurization. He publicized research demonstrating how the rapid heating of pasteurization protects milk from bacteria contamination and disease.

== Later life ==
Rosenau left the Hygienics Laboratory at Angel Island to take on a position as professor at Harvard University. During his time there, he helped establish the Harvard and Massachusetts School for Health Officers (today's Harvard T.H. Chan School of Public Health). He also became the president of the Society of American Bacteriologists in 1934, and later the president of the American Public Health Association in 1944.

Rosenau died in Chapel Hill on April 9, 1946. His records are kept at the University of North Carolina at Chapel Hill, where he has a building in his name.

== Selected publications ==
- Disinfection and Disinfectants (1902)
- Pasteurization (1908)
- The Milk Question (1912)
- Preventive Medicine and Hygiene (1913)
- All About Milk (1919)

Government offices
Preceded by Joseph J. Kinyoun	2nd Director of the Hygienic Laboratory; 1899 – 1909	Succeeded by John F. Anderson
