= Independent SAGE =

Independent group of scientists

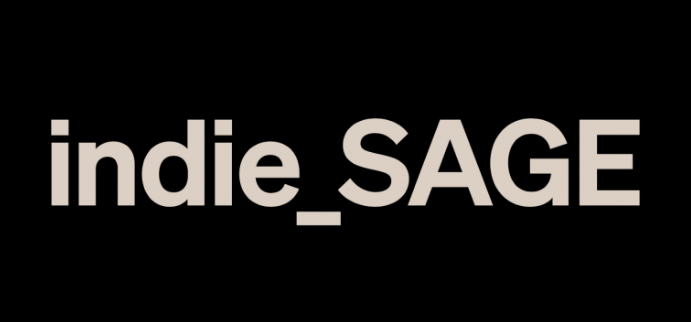
Independent SAGE logo

The Independent Scientific Advisory Group for Emergencies, better known as Independent SAGE, is a group of scientists, unaffiliated to government (although some are also in the government SAGE), that publishes advice aimed toward the UK government regarding the COVID-19 pandemic. Its name is based on SAGE, the name of the government's official Scientific Advisory Group for Emergencies.

The questions raised about the transparency of SAGE and possible political interference during the COVID-19 pandemic in the United Kingdom led to concerns about trust in public health messaging being raised by scientists and by the media. As an alternative, a group of scientists created Independent SAGE, chaired by Sir David Anthony King, a former Government Chief Scientific Advisor, in early May 2020 to "provide a clear structure on which an effective policy should be based given the inevitability that the virus will continue to cross borders".

The non-profit group The Citizens, created by The Observer journalist and political activist Carole Cadwalladr, were a founding partner with Independent SAGE in May 2020. They continue to support Independent SAGE's social media and web presence.

The role of Independent SAGE in the pandemic was not without controversy. For example, the UK's Chief Scientific Advisor Patrick Vallance has stated that he warned the group that their name could cause confusion with the official body. Emails published at the UK COVID Public Inquiry show that overlap in membership between Independent SAGE subgroups and official bodies caused confidentiality concerns about Government documents being shared with the group.

== Public statements ==
In May 2020, Independent SAGE warned against ending lockdown prematurely in places like schools. In July 2020, they published a strategy pressing the UK government to achieve 'zero Covid,' stating 'The prospect of many thousands of further deaths from COVID-19 over the next nine months is unacceptable,' although in the same report they noted only one infectious disease, smallpox, has ever been successfully eliminated.

In September 2020, Independent SAGE called for immediate government action to prevent further increase in the prevalence of COVID-19 infection, to prevent the need for a second national lockdown.

In November 2020, Sir David King stated that he was considering continuing Independent SAGE's work after the coronavirus pandemic, with a focus on combatting climate change.

== Members ==
=== Current ===
- Professor Danny Altmann
- Professor Anthony Costello
- Professor Sheena Cruickshank
- Professor Karl Friston
- Professor Trish Greenhalgh
- Dr Steve Griffin
- Dr Zubaida Haque
- Dr Binita Kane
- Professor Aris Katzourakis
- Dr Lennard Lee
- Professor Martin McKee
- Professor Susan Michie
- Dr Tolullah Oni
- Professor Christina Pagel
- Professor Stephen Reicher
- Dr Duncan Robertson
- Dr Helen Salisbury
- Professor Gabriel Scally
- Dr Kit Yates

=== Former ===
- Professor Kamlesh Khunti
- Sir David King
- Doctor Alison Pittard
- Professor Allyson Pollock
- Dr Deepti Gurdasani
- Professor Deenan Pillay
