= Gabriel Scally (physician) =

Irish physician

Gabriel Scally FFPHM
- Gabriel Scally (Osler Club of London, Royal College of Physicians, 2021)
- Born: Gabriel John Scally; September 1954 (age 71); Belfast, Northern Ireland
- Education: Queen's University Belfast; London School of Hygiene & Tropical Medicine
- Known for: Clinical governance
- Medical career
- Profession: Public health physician
- Field: Public health
- Institutions: University of Bristol
- Notable works: Donaldsons' Essential Public Health
- Awards: Milroy lecture (2002)

Gabriel John Scally FFPHM (born September 1954) is an Irish public health physician and a former regional director of public health (RDPH) for the southwest of England. He is a visiting professor of public health at the University of Bristol and is a member of the Independent SAGE group, formed during the COVID-19 pandemic in 2020. He has also been chair of the trustees of the Soil Association. Previously he was a professor of public health and planning, and director of the World Health Organization (WHO) Collaborating Centre for Healthy Urban Environments, both at the University of the West of England (UWE). He was president of the Section of Epidemiology and Public Health of the Royal Society of Medicine, a position he took in 2017.

Prior to his roles in public health, Scally trained in general practice. He spent his early career in Northern Ireland as chief administrative medical officer and director of public health for the Eastern Health and Social Services Board, where he contributed to the founding of a young people's sexual health service.

After moving to England, he led several inquiries into serious NHS clinical failures including pathology in Swindon, breast screening in Exeter and abuse in Winterbourne. He is credited, along with Sir Liam Donaldson, as defining clinical governance, a concept developed following high-profile cases, which included the Bristol heart scandal, the Shipman Inquiry and the Alder Hey organs scandal.

Scally resigned as RDPH in 2012, and was appointed as an associate fellow at the Institute for Public Policy Research, and as a visiting professor at the University of Bristol and UWE. In 2018, he assisted in an inquiry into the deaths of children from hyponatremia in Northern Ireland and led an independent inquiry into the CervicalCheck cancer scandal and the failures of cervical screening in the Republic of Ireland. In 2020, he co-authored an editorial in the British Medical Journal questioning the UK's response to COVID-19.

== Early life and education ==
Gabriel Scally was born in September 1954 in Belfast, where his father Brian Scally was a consultant psychiatrist at the Muckamore Abbey Hospital. He attended St Mary's Christian Brothers Grammar School before gaining admission to study medicine at Queen's University Belfast. As a medical student in 1977, he visited Chile on behalf of the International Union of Students. In 1978 he graduated from Queen's University Belfast before completing his master's degree in community medicine (later called public health) at the London School of Hygiene & Tropical Medicine in 1982.

== Northern Ireland ==
Scally completed his early medical training in Northern Ireland. Prior to his roles in public health, he worked in general practice. For four years from 1989 he was director of public health for the Eastern Health and Social Services Board and chief administrative officer in Northern Ireland.

Despite opposition, Scally contributed to the founding of a young people's sexual health service. With reference to health in Northern Ireland, he had voiced his concerns in the Opsahl inquiry that the Troubles had set back significant time and discussion about important health determinants because of attention diverted to media and politics. This, in turn, caused "policy deficit", a term he coined.

== England ==
In 1993, Scally moved to England to take up the post of regional director of public health (RDPH) first for South East Thames and later for the South and West Regional Health Authority. In 1998, together with Sir Liam Donaldson in a paper in the British Medical Journal, he defined clinical governance as:

A framework through which NHS organisations are accountable for continually improving the quality of their services and safeguarding high standards of care by creating an environment in which excellence in clinical care will flourish.

The concept evolved in response to high-profile cases which included the Bristol heart scandal, the Shipman Inquiry and the Alder Hey organs scandal. In light of the increasing number of public health personnel not trained in medicine, he advocated that they also be subject to statutory regulation. The concept of 'clinical governance' also featured in the British Medical Journal issue celebrating the NHS's 50th anniversary.

Subsequently, during Scally's position as RDPH in England, he became involved in a number of clinical failure inquiries, including pathology in Swindon, breast screening in Exeter and abuse in Winterbourne. He also led public health improvement programmes including Smokefree South West and Healthy Schools Plus and the creation of the Office of Sexual Health.

In March 2012, in opposition to the then Health Secretary, Andrew Lansley's, plans for the NHS, Scally resigned from England's Department of Health as a consequence of the then Conservative-Liberal Democrats' coalition government's health policies. Subsequently, he was appointed as an associate fellow at the Institute for Public Policy Research think tank, and as a visiting chair at the University of Bristol and the University of the West of England, where he was also director the World Health Organization Collaborating Centre on Healthy Urban Environments. In 2013, on the subject of food adulteration, he said that it was not a new problem.

He was also Chair of Trustees of the Soil Association.

In 2018, he assisted with a report following the inquiry into the deaths of children from hyponatraemia in Northern Ireland.

== Cervical screening ==
Beginning in May 2018, Scally led an independent inquiry into the failures of cervical screening and CervicalCheck in the Republic of Ireland, following an audit which had revealed potential errors in women diagnosed with cervical cancer. His findings, including his concerns of the attitudes of some oncologists, were reported in the Scally Report in 2018.

== COVID-19 ==
With reference to the Cheltenham Festival of 2020, which began 10 March 2020, shortly before announcement of the pandemic, Scally, said the following month that "I think it's very tempting to link [the seeming high number of COVID-19 cases in Gloucestershire] to the Cheltenham Festival. Really, from a health point of view, [it] should have been stopped in advance".

In May 2020, alongside Bobbie Jacobson from Johns Hopkins University and Kamran Abbasi from the British Medical Journal, Scally co-authored an editorial in the British Medical Journal titled "The UK's public health response to covid-19". They described the UK's response to the COVID-19 pandemic as "too little, too late, too flawed", with no adequate plan for community-based case-finding, testing, and contact tracing. Their findings were published in the New Statesman, and discussed in Medscape, the British Journal of Social Psychology and the Practice Nurse. Former director of public health, Marie Armitage, described the editorial as a "clear, concise analysis and call to action". In the same year he became a member of the Independent SAGE committee.

In 2020, he expressed concerns about the management of the COVID-19 pandemic in Ireland in the newspaper Barron's, the government's plans to end Public Health England (PHE), and the implementation of Operation Moonshot. In Northern ireland during the spring of 2021, as venues and workplaces reopened, he called for ventilation certificates to be introduced.

== Awards and honours ==
In 2002, he delivered the Royal College of Physicians' Milroy lecture, titled "The very pests of society': the Irish and 150 years of public health in England", later published in Clinical Medicine.

In 2017 he was appointed president of the epidemiology and public health section of the Royal Society of Medicine. In 2021 he was noted to be its past president.

== Selected publications ==
=== Articles ===
- Scally, Gabriel; Donaldson, Liam J (4 July 1998). "Clinical governance and the drive for quality improvement in the new NHS in England". BMJ: British Medical Journal. 317 (7150): 61–65. doi:10.1136/bmj.317.7150.61. ISSN 0959-8138. PMC 1113460. PMID 9651278.
- Scally, Gabriel (1 January 2004). "'The very pests of society': the Irish and 150 years of public health in England". Clinical Medicine. 4 (1): 77–81. doi:10.7861/clinmedicine.4-1-77. ISSN 1470-2118. PMC 4954283. PMID 14998274.
- Scally, Gabriel; Jacobson, Bobbie; Abbasi, Kamran (15 May 2020). "The UK's public health response to covid-19". British Medical Journal. 369 m1932. doi:10.1136/bmj.m1932. ISSN 1756-1833. PMID 32414712. S2CID 218657917.

=== Books ===
- Liam J. Donaldson; Gabriel Scally (2009). Donaldsons' Essential Public Health. Oxford: Radcliffe Publishing. ISBN 978-1-84619-209-8.
