= Kamran Abbasi =

British physician and sports writer

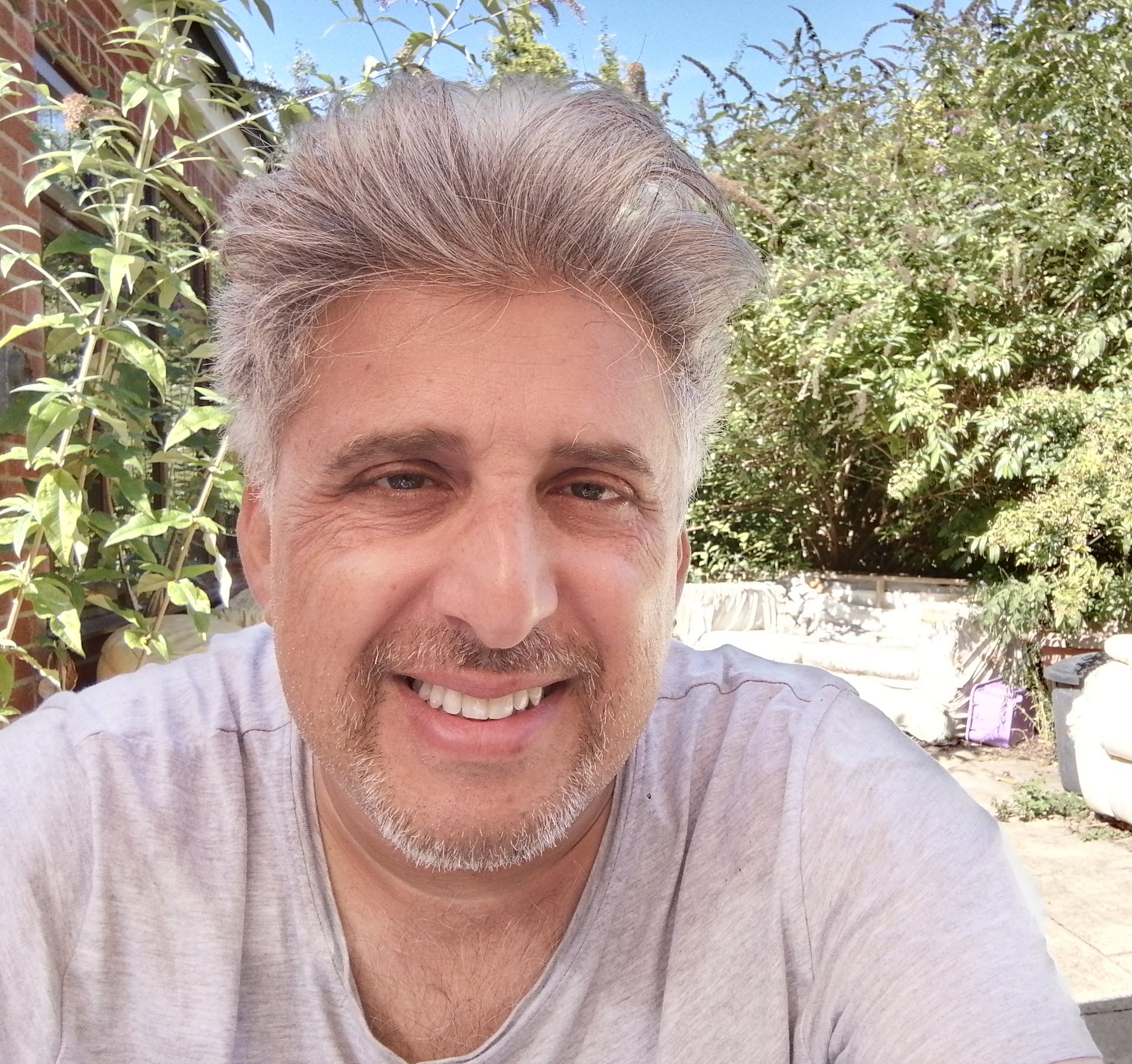
- Kamran Abbasi (2019)
- Born: Lahore, Pakistan
- Education: Oakwood School; Thomas Rotherham College; Leeds School of Medicine
- Occupations: Editor of the Journal of the Royal Society of Medicine; Editor in chief of the The BMJ; Visiting professor at Imperial College
- Known for: Editing; Global health; E-learning; Writer on cricket; Journalism
- Medical career
- Profession: Physician
- Research: Medicine

Kamran Abbasi is a Pakistani-English physician, professor, editor and author, who serves as editor-in-chief of the The BMJ. He is a visiting professor in the Department of Primary Care and Public Health at Imperial College, London, and editor of the Journal of the Royal Society of Medicine (JRSM).

Raised in Yorkshire, Abbasi graduated in medicine from Leeds School of Medicine in 1992 and worked in general medicine before commencing a career in journal editing in 1997, beginning with The BMJ, followed by the Bulletin of the World Health Organization and later the JRSM. He is a fellow of the Royal College of Physicians of Edinburgh and the Royal College of Physicians of London.

Abbasi has been a consultant editor for PLOS Medicine and has created e-learning resources for professional development of doctors, including BMJ Learning and the Royal Society of Medicine's video lecture service. He has authored books on cricket; Zindabad; The English Chronicles: a Modern History of Pakistan Cricket, published in 2012 and Englistan: An immigrant's journey on the turbulent winds of Pakistan cricket in 2020.

During the COVID-19 pandemic, Abbasi produced a series in the JRSM titled "Spotlight on COVID-19", written on the UK's response to COVID-19, including the provision of personal protective equipment for frontline staff, preparedness for the pandemic, the fear of going into hospital, and political accountability.

== Early life and education ==
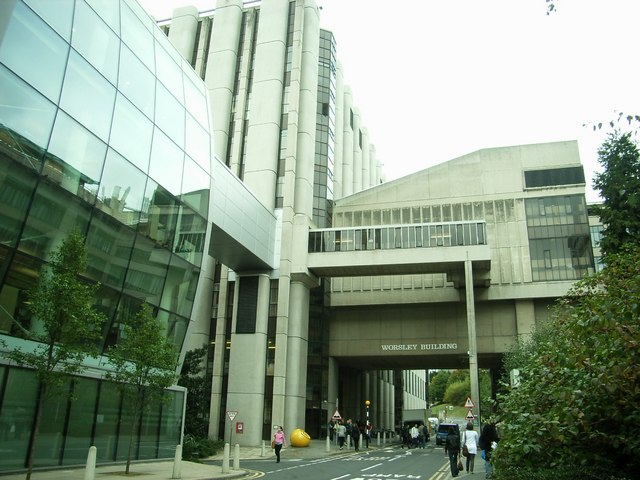
Leeds School of Medicine

Kamran Abbasi was born in Lahore, Pakistan, and moved to Rotherham, Yorkshire in 1974. He completed his early education at Oakwood School before attending the Thomas Rotherham College, both in Rotherham, South Yorkshire. In 1992, he graduated in medicine from Leeds School of Medicine.

== Career ==
In 1997, following five years in internal medicine in both Yorkshire and London, Abbasi joined the The BMJ from the Royal London and St Bartholomew's Hospitals. He took up the post of editorial registrar and then assistant editor, before becoming deputy editor in 2002 and acting editor in 2004. He was influenced by editor Richard Smith. He took up the appointment of editor-in-chief of The BMJ on 1 January 2022, succeeding Fiona Godlee.

=== Global health and politics ===
In 1999, he published a series of six articles in The BMJ looking at the role of the World Bank in global health. A year later, he was appointed editor of the Bulletin of the World Health Organization.

Abbasi became The BMJ's executive editor for content, developing the journal's expansion internationally, digitally, and in print, particularly The BMJ International editions, which he considers his greatest achievement. The first of the themed issues was in 2003, and shortly after, he was one of the three main organisers of The BMJ's first international theme issue on South Asia, where investment in primary care and particularly the education of girls in Sri Lanka and Kerala was shown to be beneficial. Their interest and continued work in South Asia has led to The BMJ offering a dedicated page to South Asia on their website since 2013.

In October 2004, while he was acting editor of The BMJ, Abbasi became the recipient of an unusually large number of responses to a BMJ article written by Derek Summerfield, who published his personal view over what he saw as organised violations of the fourth Geneva Convention by the Israeli army in Gaza and their effects on public health. The reaction to that article was later analysed by Karl Sabbagh and revealed the hostility that editors can receive when publishing on a sensitive issue. In response to the messages sent to the journal's website and the over 1000 emails sent directly to Abbasi, a sample number were published on-line within 24 hours of submission. Sabbagh explained that the published messages "were a skewed sample of what had been received, as abusive and obscene contributions were not posted", In response to these messages, many of which "abused The BMJ or Abbasi personally", Abbasi published an editorial entitled: "Should journals mix medicine and politics?" Abbasi noted that the messages were "largely biased and inflammatory on both sides" and that a number of people felt that dialogue could resolve the conflict. He specified that "in a state of conflict [those] views will be sometime abrasive and unpalatable" and argued that medicine cannot exist in a political void.

=== COVID-19 pandemic ===
In 2020, during the COVID-19 pandemic, Abbasi published his commentary on the "scandals of COVID-19", which included the topics of personal protective equipment for frontline National Health Service staff, the UK's preparedness for the pandemic, and the fear of going into hospital. In May 2020, he co-authored a paper titled "The UK's public health response to covid-19". Together with Bobbie Jacobson from the Johns Hopkins University and Gabriel Scally, they described the UK's response to the COVID-19 pandemic as "too little, too late, too flawed", with no adequate plan for community-based case-finding, testing, and contact tracing. Their findings were published in the New Statesman, and discussed in Medscape, the British Journal of Social Psychology and the Practice Nurse. His editorials relating to COVID-19 for the JRSM appear in a series titled "Spotlight on COVID-19". During the pandemic he has written on the politicization of science, and following the global death toll from COVID-19 surpassing two million by February 2021, he used the term "social murder" to call for political accountability.

=== Other journals ===
Abbasi has been editor of the Journal of the Royal Society of Medicine since 2005. He also founded BMJ Learning, an e-learning resource.

== Other roles ==
Abbasi has been appointed visiting professor at the Department of Primary Care and Public Health, Imperial College, London, member of the General Advisory Council of the King's Fund, a Fellow of the Royal College of Physicians of Edinburgh and the Royal College of Physicians of London, and patron of the South Asian Health Foundation. He is a Fellow of the Royal College of Physicians of Edinburgh and the Royal College of Physicians of London.

Abbasi has been a consultant editor for PLOS Medicine and has created three e-learning resources for professional development of doctors, including BMJ Learning and the Royal Society of Medicine's video lecture service. He has consulted for a number of organisations including Harvard University, the NHS, the World Health Organization and McKinsey & Co. He has also made contributions on radio and television, particularly with Mark Porter. In this role, Abbasi has acted as a sceptic to BBC Radio 4's weekly medical programme, Inside Health. He also writes for Dawn, a Pakistani English-language newspaper. He has in several years been listed as one of "the 50 most influential BAME people in health", by the Health Service Journal.

== Cricket ==
Following cricket since the 1970s, Abbasi has been an international writer on Pakistan cricket since 1996, starting as a blogger for Cricinfo.com with a blog called Pak Spin, and with a particular interest in the politics of cricket.

He was the first Asian columnist in an English cricket publication when he started writing for Wisden Cricket Monthly. In 2000, in one Wisden Cricket entry, he reported on Hansie Cronje and the South Africa cricket match fixing and responded by saying that the "enigma of match fixing will remain. But the reflex judgement that white is good and brown is bad is now less sustainable than it ever was. For that at least, thank you, Hansie".

In 2004, he co-authored a paper on the influence of a 1986 Pakistani victory in cricket over India on subsequent matches up to 2003. In 2012, he published a book titled The English Chronicles: Zindabad: A Modern History of Pakistan Cricket. Eight years later he wrote Englistan: An immigrant's journey on the turbulent winds of Pakistan cricket.

== Selected publications ==
=== Articles ===
- Culliford, L. (1998). "Film: The Knowledge of Healing". British Medical Journal. 317 (7172): 1599. doi:10.1136/bmj.317.7172.1599c. PMC 1114414. PMID 9836690.
- Abbasi, K. (1999). "The World Bank and World Health". British Medical Journal. 318 (7187): 865–869. doi:10.1136/bmj.318.7187.865. PMC 1115285. PMID 10092271.
- Abbasi, Kamran; Khan, Khalid S (2004). "India versus Pakistan and the power of a six: an analysis of cricket results". British Medical Journal. 328 (7443): 800. doi:10.1136/bmj.328.7443.800. PMC 383375. PMID 15070636.
- Jain, A; Nundy, S; Abbasi, K (2014). "Corruption: medicine's dirty open secret". British Medical Journal. 348 g4184. doi:10.1136/bmj.g4184. PMID 24965786..
- Abbasi, Kamran (2004). "Should journals mix medicine and politics?". British Medical Journal. 329 (7474). doi:10.1136/bmj.329.7474.0-g. PMC 526103.
- Abbasi, Kamran (2017). "A future of technology and other humans". Journal of the Royal Society of Medicine. 110 (7): 263. doi:10.1177/0141076817720629. PMC 5524266. PMID 28718386.
- Abbasi, Kamran (2018). "How to fund the NHS". Journal of the Royal Society of Medicine. 111 (6): 187. doi:10.1177/0141076818782032. PMC 6022890. PMID 29877775.
- Abbasi, Kamran (2019). "We need fewer leaders and more followers". British Medical Journal: l348. doi:10.1136/bmj.l348.

=== BMJ theme issues ===
- "Forthcoming BMJ theme issues". British Medical Journal 18 January 2003; 326 doi:10.1136/bmj.326.7381.160
- "Why a special issue of the BMJ on South Asia?". Co-authored with Zuliqar A Bhutta and Samiran Nundy. British Medical Journal 25 October 2003; 327(7421): 941–942. doi:10.1136/bmj.327.7421.941
- "Maternal and child health vital to progress of South Asia". British Medical Journal 1 April 2004. doi:10.1136/bmj.328.7443.0
- "Twelve years on: a call for papers for another special collection of articles on South Asia". Co-authored with Zuliqar A Bhutta and Samiran Nundy. BMJ 10 June 2016. 2016;353:i3252 doi:10.1136/bmj.i3252

=== Journalism ===
- "East or West, Nasser's best". An extract from a piece in the Wisden Cricket. The Guardian 25 August 1999
- "United Front". The Guardian, 20 August 2006

=== Books ===
- Zindabad: The English Chronicles: a Modern History of Pakistan Cricket. Createspace Independent Pub, 2012. ISBN 9781475100525
- Englistan: An immigrant's journey on the turbulent winds of Pakistan cricket. Independently published, 2020. ISBN 979-8679602328
