= Osier =

Osier may refer to:

- Willow or osier, a genus of deciduous trees and shrubs
  - Common osier (Salix viminalis), a species of willow
  - Osier bed, where willows were traditionally planted, coppiced, and harvested on the banks of waterways
- Red osier (Cornus sericea), a species of flowering plant
- Osier, Colorado, an unincorporated community along the Rio de Los Pinos river in Colorado
- Osier, Michigan, a ghost town in the Upper Peninsula of Michigan
- Faith Osier, African immunologist
- Ivan Osier (1888–1965), Danish Olympic medalist

== See also ==
- Osiier, a surname
- Cornus, a genus of woody plants
