= SAHF =

SAHF may refer to:

- Saudi Arabian Handball Federation, a handball governing body in Saudi Arabia
- Syrian Arab Handball Federation, a handball governing body in Syria
- South African Handball Federation, a handball governing body in South Africa
- Scandinavian-American Hall of Fame, an award in the North American continent
- South Asian Health Foundation, a charity in the United Kingdom
- SAHF, a microprocessor instruction - see X86-64#Older implementations
