= Kardashian (surname) =

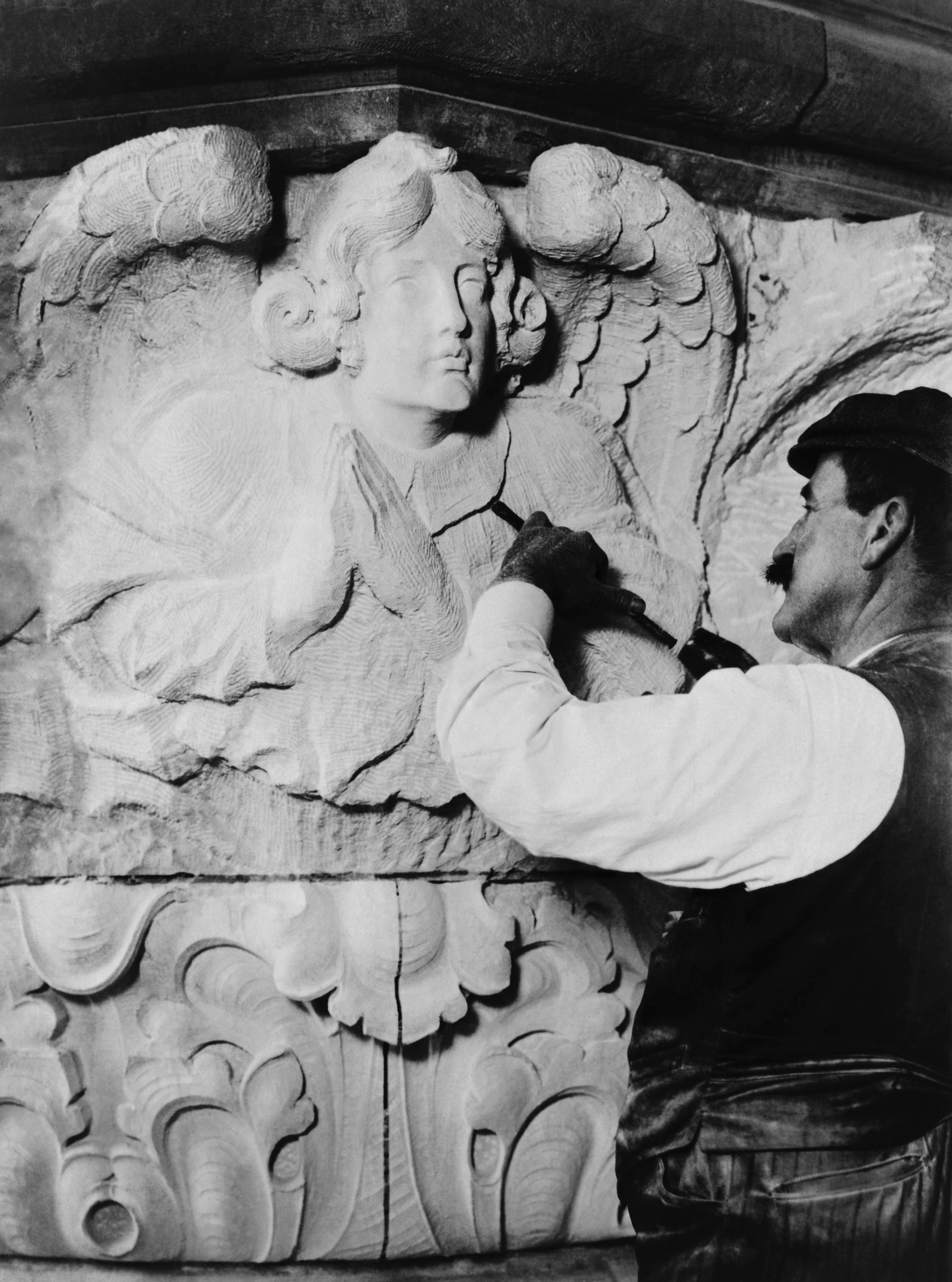
- Stone carvers
- Language: Armenian

Origin
- Meaning: "Kardash" means 'stone' ("kar") + 'carver' ("dashogh" - "dash")
- Region of origin: Armenia

Other names
- Variant forms: Cardashian, Kardaschoff, Kardashyan, Kartashyan

Kardashian (/kɑːrˈdæʃiən/; Armenian: Քարտաշյան [kʰɑɾtɑˈʃjɑn]; Armenian: Քարտաշեան (traditional orthography spelling)) is an Armenian surname (from քարտաշ kʿartaš, meaning “stone carver”). The name is sometimes romanised as Cardashian or Kartashyan, among other variants.

Notable people with the surname include:

- Artur Kartashyan (born 1997), Armenian footballer
- the Kardashian family, an Armenian-American family
  - Robert Kardashian (1944–2003), attorney and businessman who represented his friend O.J. Simpson
  - Kourtney Kardashian (born 1979), television personality, socialite, businesswoman, model, and author
  - Kim Kardashian (born 1980), media personality, businesswoman, socialite, and model
  - Khloé Kardashian (born 1984), media personality, socialite, model, businesswoman, and entrepreneur
  - Rob Kardashian (born 1987), television personality and businessman
- Vahan Cardashian (1882–1934), Armenian American lawyer and political activist

== See also ==
- Kardashian Index, a satirical measure
- Keeping Up with the Kardashians, an American reality television series focusing on the Kardashian–Jenner family
- The Kardashians, an American reality television series focusing on the Kardashian–Jenner family
