= Viviana Simon =

Professor of Microbiology

Viviana A. Simon
- Education: University of Rostock; Humboldt University; Auguste Viktoria Hospital
- Scientific career
- Workplaces: Icahn School of Medicine at Mount Sinai
- Thesis: Methodische Untersuchung zum Nachweis humanpathogener Herpesviren aus klinischen Materialien mittels Polymerase-Ketten-Reaktion (1997)

Viviana Simon is a Professor of Microbiology at the Icahn School of Medicine at Mount Sinai (ISMMS). She is a member of the ISMMS Global Health and Emerging Pathogens Institute. Her research considers viral-host interactions and the mode of action of retroviral restriction factors. During the COVID-19 pandemic, Simon developed an antibody test that can determine immunity to Coronavirus disease 2019.

== Early life and education ==
Simon completed her medical training at the Vivantes Auguste Viktoria Hospital in Berlin. She earned her doctoral degree at the University of Rostock, where she researched herpesviridae using a polymerase chain reaction. Simon started her career at Rockefeller University.

== Research and career ==
Simon studies the biology of HIV and which aspects of the infection make it difficult to treat or cure. She has studied the modes of action of HIV restriction factors as well as the escape of lentiviral vectors. Simon investigates a group of genes that can restrict the replication of exo- and endogenous viruses. APOBEC is a family of cytidine deaminases (enzymes) that are expressed in cells that are susceptible to HIV-1. She has shown that APOBEC Complex 3G (C3G) is active against HIV-1 and HIV-2, as well as LTR retrotransposon and Hepatitis B. Simon has demonstrated that the HIV Viral infectivity factor protein counters the antiretroviral activity of APOBEC3G by inducing its degradation by proteasome. She has also generated a HIV/SIV Viral infectivity factor (Vif)-APOlipoprotein B mRNA-Editing Catalytic polypeptide (APOBEC) interface model. She believes that restriction mediated by APOBEC cytidine deaminase causes the diversification of HIV-1.

Working with Florian Krammer, a colleague in the Department of Microbiology at the Icahn School of Medicine at Mount Sinai, Simon created an antibody test that can determine immunity to Coronavirus disease 2019. The test makes use of an serological enzyme-linked-immuno-sorbent-assays (ELISA), which measure the presence of coronavirus antibodies in the blood. The test can tell whether someone has ever had coronavirus disease, which allows researchers to better understand which members of the population do or do not have the disease. Coronavirus disease patients who have recently recovered have high levels of antibodies in the blood, and this convalescent plasma can be used to treat critically ill patients. Antibody testing can also support medical professionals in deciding which staff take on the riskiest tasks (for example, intubating infected patients) as they can identify healthcare workers who have been exposed and are immune.

== Selected publications ==
- Simon, Viviana; Ho, David D; Abdool Karim, Quarraisha (2006). "HIV/AIDS epidemiology, pathogenesis, prevention, and treatment". The Lancet. 368 (9534): 489–504. doi:10.1016/s0140-6736(06)69157-5. ISSN 0140-6736. PMC 2913538. PMID 16890836.
- Pfeffer, Sébastien; Sewer, Alain; Lagos-Quintana, Mariana; Sheridan, Robert; Sander, Chris; Grässer, Friedrich A.; van Dyk, Linda F.; Ho, C. Kiong; Shuman, Stewart; Chien, Minchen; Russo, James J. (2005). "Identification of microRNAs of the herpesvirus family". Nature Methods. 2 (4): 269–276. doi:10.1038/nmeth746. ISSN 1548-7105. PMID 15782219. S2CID 39189931.
- Simon, V R; Swayne, T C; Pon, L A (1995-07-15). "Actin-dependent mitochondrial motility in mitotic yeast and cell-free systems: identification of a motor activity on the mitochondrial surface". The Journal of Cell Biology. 130 (2): 345–354. doi:10.1083/jcb.130.2.345. ISSN 0021-9525. PMC 2199926. PMID 7615636.
