= Danny Altmann =

British immunologist

Academic background
- Education: University of London; University of Bristol

Danny Altmann is a British immunologist, and Professor of Immunology at Imperial College London.

Altmann earned a bachelor's degree from the University of London in 1980, and a PhD from the University of Bristol in 1983 on T cell immunity to herpesviruses.

Altmann is the son of John Altmann, who arrived as a refugee from the Holocaust on the Kindertransport, and Marlene Altmann, who arrived after liberation from Auschwitz. Through her, he is in turn the great-grandson of German philanthropist Adolf Sternheim.

Altmann runs a research lab at Imperial College's Hammersmith Hospital site, "focusing on HLA genes, T cells and NK cells in autoimmunity, cancer and infectious disease." He has been based there since 1994. Between 2011 and 2013 he was also Head of Pathogens, Immunity and Population Health at the Wellcome Trust. He now runs a suite of projects focussed on understanding the immunology of Long Covid, which has included co-authoring The Long Covid Handbook in 2022 with Gez Medinger, providing expert advice to sufferers of Long Covid.

He is editor-in-chief of Oxford Open Immunology. For 20 years, Altmann was editor of British Society for Immunology (BSI) journals, including 14-years as editor-in-chief at Immunology, and is an associate editor at Vaccine and Frontiers in Immunology. Altmann is a trustee of the Medical Research Foundation. He has sat on the Strategy Board of the African Research Excellence Fund since its inception.

During the COVID-19 pandemic, he has served in a number of policy advisory roles. He has been a member of Independent SAGE since December 2021. He was the guest on the BBC Radio 4 programme The Life Scientific in February 2023.

In May 2026 Altmann was elected a Fellow of the Academy of Medical Sciences.
