= Florence Susan Thim Peck Wong =

British physician

Florence Susan Thim Peck Wong CBE
- Education: King's College London
- Scientific career
- Workplaces: Cardiff University; University of Bristol

Florence Susan Thim Peck Wong is a British physician who is Professor and Deputy Director of Infection and Immunity at Cardiff University. Her research focuses on understanding immune system function in Type 1 diabetes. She was appointed Commander of the British Empire in the 2025 New Year Honours.

== Early life and education ==
Wong completed her medical degree at King's College London. She earned an intercalated bachelor's degree in biochemistry. She went on to earn a doctorate in the immunogenetics of diabetes at King's. After graduating, she was appointed a Wellcome Trust Senior Fellow at King's College London.

== Research and career ==
Wong's clinical work looks to treat people with type 1 diabetes. Specifically, Wong has treated people with continuous insulin infusion pumps. Wong investigates immune system function in type 1 diabetes. To better understand Type 1 diabetes, Wong uses T cell immunology, B cell immunology and the innate immune system. She has explored the role of the gut microbiome in the development of diabetes.

== Awards and honours ==
- 2018 Diabetes UK Dorothy Hodgkin Lecture
- 2019 Fellow of the Learned Society of Wales
- 2021 Kayla and Gerold Grodsky Basic Scientist award for major contributions to Type 1 Diabetes Research
- 2024 Appointed Commander of the Order of the British Empire

== Selected publications ==
- Mohammad Alhadj Ali; Yuk-Fun Liu; Sefina Arif; et al. (1 August 2017). "Metabolic and immune effects of immunotherapy with proinsulin peptide in human new-onset type 1 diabetes". Science Translational Medicine. 9 (402). doi:10.1126/scitranslmed.aaf7779. ISSN 1946-6234. PMID 28794283. Wikidata Q40088521.
- S L Thrower; L James; W Hall; et al. (20 November 2008). "Proinsulin peptide immunotherapy in type 1 diabetes: report of a first-in-man Phase I safety study". Clinical and Experimental Immunology. 155 (2): 156–165. doi:10.1111/j.1365-2249.2008.03814.x. ISSN 0009-9104. PMC 2675245. PMID 19040615. Wikidata Q40023867.
- R. Mallone; S. I. Mannering; B. M. Brooks-Worrell; I. Durinovic-Belló; C. M. Cilio; F. S. Wong; N. C. Schloot (5 October 2010). "Isolation and preservation of peripheral blood mononuclear cells for analysis of islet antigen-reactive T cell responses: position statement of the T-Cell Workshop Committee of the Immunology of Diabetes Society". Clinical and Experimental Immunology. 163 (1): 33–49. doi:10.1111/j.1365-2249.2010.04272.x. ISSN 0009-9104. PMC 3010910. PMID 20939860. Wikidata Q37799656.
