= Spanish Society for Immunology =

Spanish Society for Immunology (SEI)
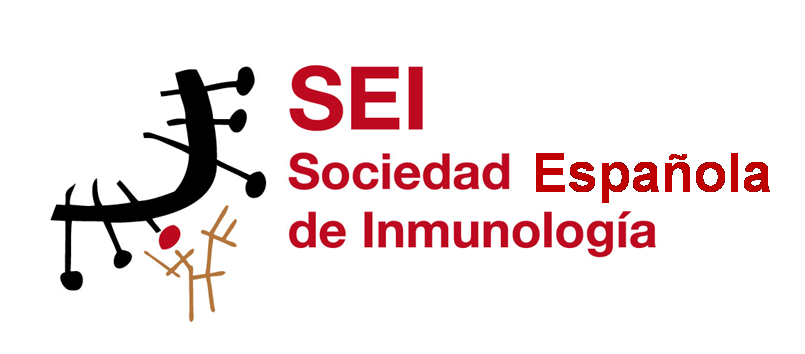
- Founded: 1975
- Founder: Fernando Ortiz Masllorens
- Type: Non-profit organization (NPO)
- Purpose: Promotion and development of Immunology
- Location: Barcelona, (Spain)
- Members: 908 (November, 2018)
- Website: https://www.inmunologia.org/

The Spanish Society for Immunology (Sociedad Española de Inmunología, SEI) is a legally recognized professional non-profit organization in Spain, dedicated to promote and support excellence in research, scholarship and clinical practice in immunology. It has above 1.000 members in the field of health, research, teaching and industry, almost all Spanish, but also Latin American. It was founded in 1975 by Fernando Ortiz Masllorens.

Every year the society organizes national congresses in different Spanish cities and publishes a scientific journal called Inmunología, founded in 1982, a quarterly publication in Spanish and English on the biology, physiology and pathology of the immune system.

MISSION A medical-scientific society that promotes the development and advancement of Immunology as a science of life and health, and defends the scientific and professional interests of its members.

VISION To be the nucleus for establishing professional networks, the forum for scientific and academic debate on immunology and to be a point of reference for institutions and organisations in all matters relating to Immunology. We want immunology to be visible and accessible to the whole population. We seek to promote integration and multidisciplinarity with societies and groups related to Immunology.

VALUES All this is to be achieved on the basis of scientific evidence, professional responsibility, social awareness and present and future needs. The Society will seek parity and inclusiveness and will be governed, for the development of Immunology, with transparency, independence and integrity.

Society federated with EFIS (European Federation of Immnunolgical Societies), IUIS (International Union of Immunological Societies), FOCIS (Federation Of Clinical Immunology Societies), FACME (Federación de Asociaciones Cientifico Médicas Españolas) and COSCE (Confederación de Sociedades Científicas de España).

== See also ==
- British Society for Immunology
- International Union of Immunological Societies
- American Association of Immunologists
