= Carenza Lewis =

British archaeologist (born 1963)

Carenza Lewis FSA FHEA FRSA
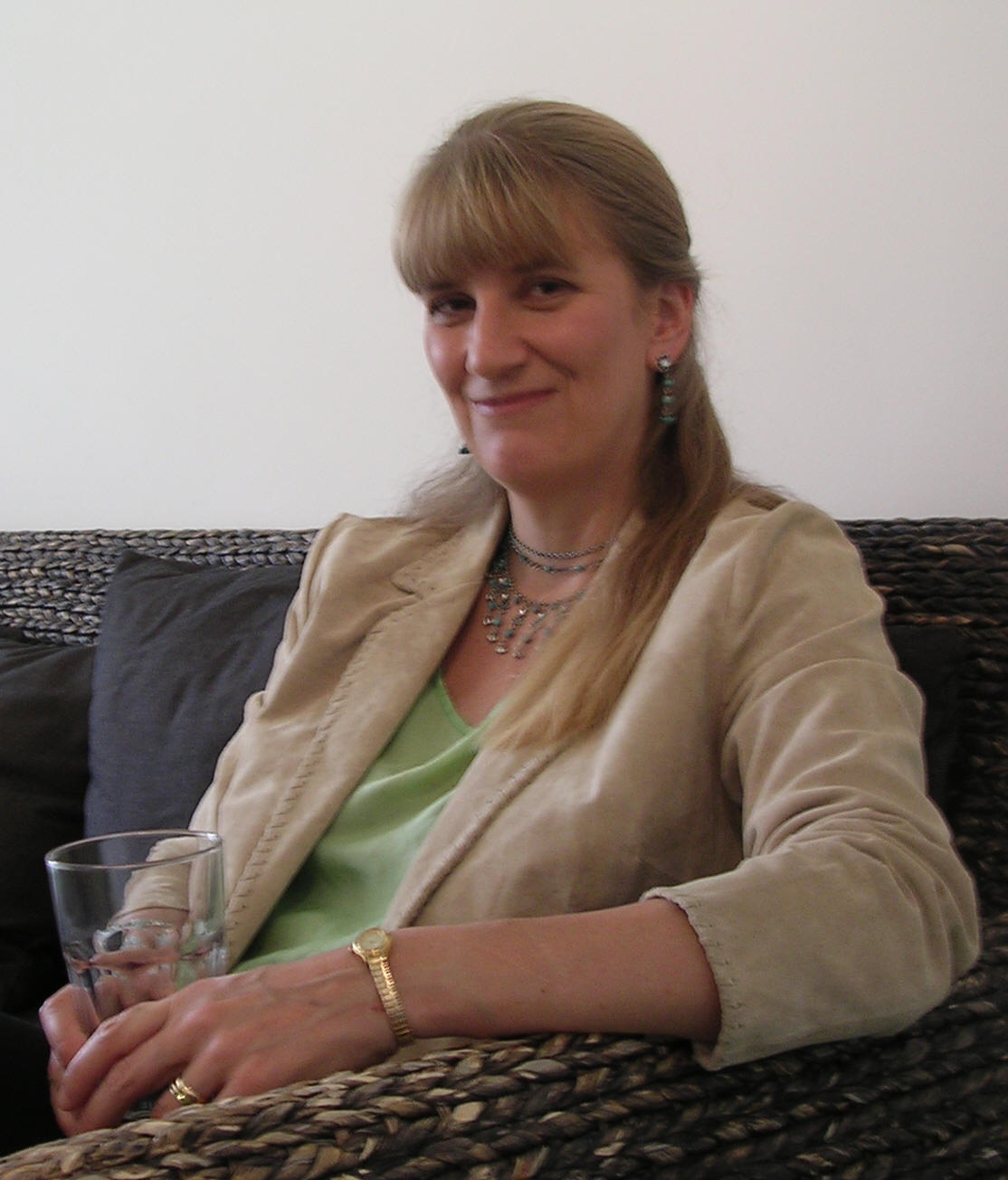
- Lewis in 2005
- Born: 30 November 1963 (age 62)
- Known for: Member of Time Team

Academic background
- Education: Girton College, Cambridge

Academic work
- Discipline: Archaeology
- Sub-discipline: Medieval archaeology; landscape archaeology; community archaeology
- Institutions: Royal Commission on the Historical Monuments of England; University of Birmingham; Corpus Christi College, Cambridge; Department of Archaeology, University of Cambridge; University of Lincoln

Carenza Rachel Lewis (born 30 November 1963) is a British academic archaeologist and television presenter.

== Early life ==
Lewis received her formal education at the private All Hallows Convent School in Norfolk. She studied archaeology and anthropology at Girton College, Cambridge.

== Field and academic career ==
In 1985, she joined the Royal Commission on the Historical Monuments of England as a field archaeologist for the Wessex area. During part of her time with the Commission she was seconded to the History Department of the University of Birmingham to research the relationship between settlement and landscape in the East Midlands. She followed this with a similar project in Hampshire and the Isle of Wight.

Lewis was elected a Fellow of the Society of Antiquaries of London in 1998. In 1999, she was elected a visiting fellow of Corpus Christi College, Cambridge, where she was a Senior Research Associate and Affiliated Lecturer. In 2004, she took on a new post at Cambridge to promote undergraduate archaeology, and created Access Cambridge Archaeology. In 2015, Lewis was appointed to the Professorial Chair of 'Public Understanding of Research' at the University of Lincoln.

== Television career ==
In the early 1990s she joined the team presenting the Time Team series, a new television programme designed to make archaeology accessible for the general public, which was first broadcast on Channel 4 Television in 1994. She appeared on the show from 1993 to 2005, appearing in each of the first twelve seasons. The ratings success of the series led to further television presenting commissions for Lewis, including the series House Detectives (1997–2002).

In 2000, Lewis presented an episode of the BBC's theoretical history programme entitled What If, in which she examined the failed revolt of Queen Boudicca and the Iceni against the Roman Empire in AD 60. She also devised and presented a series called Sacred Sites for HTV.

In 2010, she appeared in the television series Michael Wood's Story of England.

In 2022, she rejoined the Time Team cast for its YouTube revival.

== Personal life ==
Lewis has three children. In 2000, she appeared in national print media detailing her experiences as one of a number of victims of medical misdiagnosis at the hands of Dr James Elwood in the late 1990s.

== Publications ==
- Aston, Mick and Lewis, Carenza (eds.) (1994) The Medieval Landscape of Wessex Oxford: Oxbow
- Lewis, Carenza, Mitchell-Fox, Patrick and Dyer, Christopher (1997) Village, Hamlet and Field: Changing Medieval Settlements in Central England Manchester University Press
- Lewis, Carenza, Harding, Phil and Aston, Mick (2000) Time Team's Timechester: a companion to archaeology; ed. Tim Taylor London: Macmillan
- Lewis, Carenza, Scott, Anna, Cruse, Anna, Nicholson, Raf, & Symonds, Dominic (2019) ‘Our Lincolnshire’: exploring public engagement with heritage Summertown, Oxford: Archaeopress Publishing Ltd.
- Aberg, Alan and Lewis, Carenza (eds.) (2000) The Rising Tide: Archaeology and Coastal Landscapes Oxford: Oxbow
