= Yvonne Maldonado =

American pediatrician

Yvonne Aida Maldonado
- Born: United States
- Education: University of California, Los Angeles; Stanford University School of Medicine, MD (1981)
- Scientific career
- Fields: Infectious Diseases, Pediatrics, Epidemiology

Yvonne A. "Bonnie" Maldonado is an American physician, pediatrician, and Professor of Pediatrics and of Health Research and Policy at Stanford University, with a focus on Infectious Diseases. She founded Stanford's pediatric HIV Clinic and now serves as Stanford University School of Medicine's Senior Associate Dean of Faculty Development and Diversity.

== Early life ==
Raised in Los Angeles, Maldonado is the daughter of Mexican immigrants and was the first in her family to attend college. Maldonado received her bachelor's degree from University of California, Los Angeles. She then attended Stanford University School of Medicine, where she received her Doctor of Medicine degree in 1981. She then performed her residency in pediatrics at Johns Hopkins Hospital, where she remained for her fellowship in pediatric infectious diseases.

== Career ==
Following her residency she joined the Centers for Disease Control and Prevention as an Epidemic Intelligence Service (EIS) Officer in the mid-1980s at the beginning of the HIV/AIDS epidemic in the United States. There, she became interested in how to prevent the spread of HIV infection from mothers to their babies, particularly in developing countries. In 1988, she became a professor of pediatrics at Stanford University, where she started the pediatric HIV Clinic.

=== Leadership and service ===
Maldonado has contributed her expertise to governmental policy, serving on the National Vaccine Advisory Committee through the United States Department of Health and Human Services and as a member of Governor Gavin Newsom's California Initiative to Advance Precision Medicine Advisory Council. She is the Chair of the committee on infectious diseases at the American Academy of Pediatrics and serves as a Senior Fellow at the Stanford Center for Innovation in Global Health. She is also an advocate for diversity, equity, and inclusion, serving as Stanford's Associate Dean of Faculty Development and Diversity since May 2014, succeeding Hannah Valantine.

== Research ==
Her research focuses on the epidemiology and prevention of infectious diseases, such as rotavirus, measles, mumps, rubella, polio, and pediatric HIV infection. She has also worked on developing and evaluating programs to prevent gender-based violence, working on interventions in Kenya. Her group partnered with the non-profit "Ujamaa-Africa/No Means No Worldwide" to develop and implement a 12-hour empowerment program to teach girls verbal and physical techniques to prevent sexual harassment and assault. They found the intervention was successful in both curbing the incidence of sexual assault and increasing the likelihood that girls would disclose assault.

=== HIV research ===
One of Maldonado's research interests is preventing perinatal HIV transmission, which includes preventing transmission through breastfeeding and maximizing prevention strategies in developing countries. She and her colleagues found that treating infants with the anti-retroviral drug nevirapine for their first six months of life reduces HIV transmission through breastfeeding.

=== Vaccine research ===
Maldonado's research program also focuses on the development and implementation of vaccines. Her group has received funding from the Bill & Melinda Gates Foundation to understand the factors that underlie the poor immunogenicity of the oral polio vaccine among children in three communities in Orizaba, Veracruz, Mexico with the goal of understanding how to improve immunogenicity. She also studies the circulation and epidemiology of vaccine-derived polioviruses, which originate from the live oral vaccine used against polio. She notes the live vaccine is still in use in developing countries, despite associated risks, because it is much cheaper and because manufacturers are still working to ramp up production of the inactivated vaccine, which is five times more expensive (as of 2018).

She has also analyzed the efficacy of mandatory vaccination policies, which have been implemented in some European countries. She also found that California's elimination of non-medical vaccine exemptions for students entering school in 2016 also led to an increase in vaccine coverage. While mandates are effective in increasing immunization, Maldonado and her colleagues have also advocated for interventions to combat misinformation and address vaccine hesitancy.

=== COVID-19 response ===
Maldonado and her team have been involved in many of the studies at Stanford University seeking to understand the biology and epidemiology of SARS-CoV-2. She has worked on a study of the accuracy of three different self-administered nasal swab techniques, which would allow individuals to test themselves for infection without the need to come to the hospital. In the meantime, she has spoken of the importance of drive-through COVID-19 testing, which Stanford implemented to minimize the risk of spreading the disease at hospitals. She also launched a study to understand how COVID-19 is transmitted within a household. Adults who come into the hospital for COVID-19 were asked to perform at-home nose swab tests, along with all members of their household, as well as keep a symptom log to understand when infection is spread and whether that spread occurs before or after symptoms have disappeared. Her team also worked to develop and implement an antibody test to determine if someone had contracted COVID-19; the test was approved by the Food and Drug Administration in early April 2020.

== Awards and honors ==
- Epidemic Intelligence Service Alumni Award, Centers for Disease Control and Prevention, 1989
- Multicultural Alumni Hall of Fame, Stanford University, 2001
- RISE (Reach, Inspire, Serve and Engage) Alumni Award, Stanford University School of Medicine, 2018
- Elected to the National Academy of Medicine, 2023.
