= Immunopaedia =

Website

- Industry: Educational website
- Headquarters: South Africa
- Website: www.immunopaedia.org.za

Immunopaedia is a non-profit educational website in South Africa that provides information about basic and clinical immunology and summaries of scientific research in these fields. It was founded by South African HIV researcher Clive Gray to help clinicians in South Africa better address the high incidence of HIV/AIDS in the country. It was developed with funds from an Elizabeth Glaser Pediatric AIDS Foundation International Leadership Award. It won the American Association for the Advancement of Science's "Science Prize for Online Resources in Education " award in 2010. Immunopaedia is the official provider of online pre-course material for the International Union of Immunological Societies (IUIS) immunology courses.
