= Gavin Yamey =

British-American physician and researcher

Academic background
- Education: BA, physiological sciences/medicine, University of Oxford; MBBS, 1994, University College London; MRCP (UK), 1994, Royal College of Physicians; MPH, 2010, London School of Hygiene & Tropical Medicine

Gavin Mark Yamey is a British-American physician and global health researcher. He is the director of the Center for Policy Impact in Global Health at Duke University and a professor of the practice of global health and public policy.

== Early life and education ==
Yamey earned his Bachelor of Arts degree in physiological sciences/medicine from the University of Oxford, his Bachelor of Medicine and Bachelor of Surgery (MBBS) from University College London in 1994 and his Master of Public Health from the London School of Hygiene & Tropical Medicine in 2010. Upon receiving his MBBS, Yamey worked in a variety of London teaching hospitals and completed his public health training at the London School of Hygiene and Tropical Medicine. He finished his medical training at Oxford University and University College London, qualifying as a physician in 1994 and becoming a member of the Royal College of Physicians in 1997.

== Career ==
Yamey moved to San Francisco in 2001 to become the deputy editor of the Western Journal of Medicine while also remaining an assistant editor for The BMJ. By 2004, he was appointed as a founding senior editor of PLOS Medicine and was the principal investigator on a grant from the Bill & Melinda Gates Foundation to support the launch of PLOS Neglected Tropical Diseases. A few years later, Yamey received a Kaiser Family Foundation Mini-Fellowship in Global Health Reporting to write a series of news features and editorials on scaling up low-cost, low-technology health tools in East Africa. As a professor at the UCSF School of Medicine, Yamey served on two international health commissions, the Lancet Commission on Investing in Health and the Lancet Commission on Global Surgery, and led the writing of "Global Health 2035" which was published on December 3, 2013. He was also a co-author on a report titled "Global Surgery 2030: A Roadmap for High-Income Country Actors", which arose from the Lancet Commission on Global Surgery, and which was meant to be used as a roadmap to expand access to surgical care around the world.

In 2015, Yamey joined the Duke University Global Health Institute faculty as a professor of the practice of global health and public policy. and an associate director in the Institute responsible for leading a global health policy initiative. While serving in this role, he was also appointed professor of public policy in the Duke Sanford School of Public Policy. In December 2016, he became the director of the newly established Center for Policy Impact in Global Health at Duke. Yamey followed this up by presenting the "Investing in Health: The Economic Case" at the World Innovation Summit for Health to promote investing in cost-effective health interventions.

As the director of the Center for Policy Impact in Global Health, Yamey and his research team address questions in global health, particularly related to its financing, governance, architecture and delivery. In 2018, the Center team used the Portfolio-to-Impact (P2I), a financial modeling tool, to analyze candidate medicines, vaccines, diagnostics and other technologies for neglected diseases at various stages of development in an effort to calculate the costs of developing these products.

Prior to the COVID-19 pandemic, Yamey published an op-ed titled "The Odds of a Devastating Pandemic Just Went Up" which was critical of Trump administration's decision to scale back investments for pandemic prevention and response. Once the pandemic hit, Yamey collaborated with researchers to co-author "Ensuring global access to COVID-19 vaccines", which listed suggestion on how to best deploy the vaccine to the population. As a result, he also worked alongside David McAdams and the World Health Organization to map out strategies for deploying an effective COVID-19 vaccine worldwide. Beyond Duke, Yamey is a columnist for Time magazine where he has written articles on the United States' response to COVID-19.
