= Faith Osier =

African immunologist

- Born: 1972; Kenya
- Alma mater: University of Liverpool; University of Nairobi; Open University
- Known for: Malaria Research
- Awards: Sofia Kovalevskaya Award (2016); Royal Society Africa Prize (2014); Fellows of the African Academy of Sciences (2016); Fellow of the Academy of Medical Sciences (2024)
- Website: www.faithosier.net
- Academic career
- Institutions: Heidelberg University; University of Oxford (2008–2010); London School of Hygiene and Tropical Medicine (2004–2005); National Health Service (2001–2004); Ministry of Health (1996–1998)
- Thesis: Immune responses to polymorphic antigens and protection against severe malaria in Kenyan children.
- Doctoral advisor: Kevin Marsh

Faith Hope Among’in Osier is a Kenyan immunologist, paediatrician and educator.

== Education ==
Faith Osier was born in Kenya in 1972. trained the University of Nairobi, where she obtained her MBChB degree in 1996. She worked in the Coast General Provincial Hospital for two years, before joining Kilifi District Hospital. She completed a Masters in Human Immunity at the University of Liverpool, where she was awarded a prize for being the best student of the year. In 2008 she earned a PhD from the Open University. Her thesis was entitled Immune responses to polymorphic antigens and protection against severe malaria in Kenyan children and was supervised by Kevin Marsh. Osier is the current President of the International Union of Immunological Societies, a position she will hold until 2022.

== Career ==
Before moving to the UK, Osier worked as a Medical Officer at Kenya Medical Research Institute in Kilifi. She decided to specialise in paediatric medicine, moved to the UK and became a member of the Royal College of Paediatrics and Child Health UK.

Osier is interested in how people develop a natural immunity to malaria. She works with the Wellcome Sanger Institute and the Burnet Institute. She believes the antibody-based malaria vaccine could be effective. She holds a Wellcome Trust fellowship in Public Health and Tropical Medicine. In 2014 she won the African Research Leader Award from the Medical Research Council and Department for International Development. She was also awarded the Young African Scientist Award from the European Virtual Institute for Malaria Research. Osier also won the Merle A Sande Health Leadership Award. She was awarded the Royal Society Pfizer Award in 2014. In 2016 she won the Sofia Kovalevskaya prize from the Alexander von Humboldt Foundation, and moved to Universitat Heidelberg to continue her malaria research. Until 2022, Osier was the executive director of the IAVI - Human Immunology Laboratory in London. Ultimately, Osier looks to "eliminate malaria for the health and economic empowerment of Africa".

Osier is interested in improving the prospects of African Scientists, and has her own research group in the Kilifi County District Hospital. She is concerned about the brain drain out of African universities. She is a mentor with Initiative to Develop African Research Leaders. Osier is a visiting professor at the University of Oxford, where she works in the Infection Immunology and Translational Medicine group. She is on the Council of the Federation of African Immunological Societies. She is Vice President of the International Union of Immunological Societies. She was named a TED Fellow in 2018. Faith is the leader of the SMART (South-south Malaria Antigen Research ParTnership) network which enhances research capacity by aiding the sharing of samples and resources from longitudinal Malaria cohorts.

In June 2022, Osier was appointed co-director of Imperial College London's Institute of Infection, where she is establishing a malaria research group.

== Selected publications ==
- Faith H.A. Osier, Gregory Fegan, Spencer D. Polley, Linda Murungi, Federica Verra, Kevin K.A. Tetteh, Brett Lowe, Tabitha Mwangi, Peter C. Bull, Alan W. Thomas, David R. Cavanagh, Jana S. McBride, David E. Lanar, Margaret J. Mackinnon, David J. Conway, Kevin Marsh. 2008. Breadth and Magnitude of Antibody Responses to Multiple Plasmodium falciparum Merozoite Antigens Are Associated with Protection from Clinical Malaria. Infect Immun; 76(5):2240-8. doi:10.1128/iai.01585-07.
- Philip Bejon, Thomas N. Williams, Anne Liljander, Abdisalan M. Noor, Juliana Wambua, Edna Ogada, Ally Olotu, Faith H. A. Osier, Simon I. Hay, Anna Färnert, Kevin Marsh. 2010. Stable and Unstable Malaria Hotspots in Longitudinal Cohort Studies in Kenya. PLoS Med: 7(7): e1000304. doi:10.1371/journal.pmed.1000304.
- Alexander D. Douglas, Andrew R. Williams, Joseph J. Illingworth, Gathoni Kamuyu, Sumi Biswas, Anna L. Goodman, David H. Wyllie, Cécile Crosnier, Kazutoyo Miura, Gavin J. Wright, Carole A. Long, Faith H. Osier, Kevin Marsh, Alison V. Turner, Adrian V.S. Hill, Simon J. Draper. 2011. The blood-stage malaria antigen PfRH5 is susceptible to vaccine-inducible cross-strain neutralizing antibody. Nat Commun; 20;2:601. doi:10.1038/ncomms1615.
- Michelle J. Boyle, Linda Reiling, Gaoqian Feng, Christine Langer, Faith H. Osier, Harvey Aspeling-Jones, Yik Sheng Cheng, Janine Stubbs, Kevin K.A. Tetteh, David J. Conway, James S. McCarthy, Ivo Muller, Kevin Marsh, Robin F. Anders, James G. Beeson. 2015. Human antibodies fix complement to inhibit Plasmodium falciparum invasion of erythrocytes and are associated with protection against malaria. Immunity; 42(3):580-90. doi:10.1016/j.immuni.2015.02.012.
- Faith H.A. Osier, Gaoqian Feng, Michelle J. Boyle, Christine Langer, Jingling Zhou, Jack S. Richards, Fiona J. McCallum, Linda Reiling, Anthony Jaworowski, Robin F. Anders, Kevin Marsh, James G. Beeson. 2014. Opsonic phagocytosis of Plasmodium falciparum merozoites: mechanism in human immunity and a correlate of protection against malaria. BMC Med; 12:108. doi:10.1186/1741-7015-12-108.
