= Clinical and Experimental Immunology =

Clinical & Experimental Immunology
- Discipline: Immunology
- Language: English
- Edited by: Claudia Mauri

Publication details
- History: 1966-present
- Publisher: Oxford University Press on behalf of the British Society for Immunology
- Frequency: Monthly
- Impact factor: 5.732 (2021)

Standard abbreviations
- ISO 4: Clin. Exp. Immunol.

Indexing
- CODEN: CEXIAL
- ISSN: 0009-9104 (print); 1365-2249 (web)
- LCCN: 66009870
- OCLC no.: 37104197

Links
- Journal homepage; Latest issue; Society site

Clinical & Experimental Immunology is a peer-reviewed medical journal covering clinical and translational immunology. The editor-in-chief is Professor Claudia Mauri (University College London). It is published by Oxford University Press on behalf of the British Society for Immunology, of which it is the official journal.

According to the Journal Citation Reports, the journal has a 2021 impact factor of 5.732, ranking it 58th out of 161 journals in the category "Immunology".

== See also ==
- Immunology
