= International Union of Immunological Societies =

International umbrella organization for immunology societies

- Abbreviation: IUIS
- Formation: 1969; 57 years ago
- Type: NGO
- Headquarters: Kurfürstendamm 71
- Location: Berlin, Germany
- Region served: Worldwide
- Official language: English
- President: Faith Osier
- Parent organization: International Council for Science (ICSU)
- Website: iuis.org

The International Union of Immunological Societies (IUIS), a member of the International Council for Science, is an organization which serves as an umbrella organization for many national and regionally grouped immunological societies. The organization was founded in 1969. The ten founding member societies were the American Association of Immunologists, British Society for Immunology, Canadian Society for Immunology, Dutch Society for Immunology, Gesellschaft fur Immunologie, Israel Immunological Society, Polish Society of Immunology, Scandinavian Society for Immunology, Societe Francaise d'immunologie, and Yugoslav Immunological Society. IUIS had 84 member societies in 2024.

The 2022–2025 executive committee of the IUIS is Miriam Merad, President; Rita Carsetti, Vice-President; João P. B. Viola, Secretary General; Michael Ratcliffe, Treasurer; Faith Osier, Past President.

Every three years the IUIS organizes an international congress, called the International Congress of Immunology (ICI), with one of its national society members. The ICI congress (rebranded as IUIS2019) took place in Beijing, China, in 2019. IUIS2023 was held in Cape Town, South Africa. Vienna, Austria will host IUIS2025.

Frontiers in Immunology is the IUIS' official journal.

The standing committees of the IUIS are Clinical Immunology, Early Career, Education, Gender Equity, Inborn Errors of Immunity, Immunotherapy, Nomenclature, Publications, Quality Assessment and Standardization, Vaccines, and Veterinary.

Among their activities is classification of primary immunodeficiency diseases.

International Congresses and Presidents
Nr.	Year	ICI Location		Term	President	From
19.	2025	Vienna	Austria	2022-2025	Miriam Merad	France
18.	2023	Cape Town	South Africa	2022-2025	Miriam Merad	France
17.	2019	Beijing	China	2019–2022	Faith Osier	Kenya
16.	2016	Melbourne	Australia	2016–2019	Alberto Mantovani	Italy
15.	2013	Milan	Italy	2013–2016	Jorge Kalil	Brazil
14.	2010	Kobe	Japan	2010–2013	Stefan H. E. Kaufmann	Germany
13.	2007	Rio de Janeiro	Brazil	2007–2010	Peter C. Doherty	Australia
12.	2004	Montreal	Canada	2004–2007	Rolf Zinkernagel	Switzerland
11.	2001	Stockholm	Sweden	2001–2004	Philippa Marrack	United Kingdom
10.	1998	New Delhi	India	1998–2001	Fritz Melchers	Switzerland
9.	1995	San Francisco	United States	1995–1998	Tomio Tada	Japan
8.	1992	Budapest	Hungary	1992–1995	Henry Metzger	France
7.	1988	Berlin	Germany	1989–1992	Jacob B. Natvig	Norway
6.	1986	Toronto	Canada	1986–1989	Gustav J.V.Nossal	Australia
5.	1983	Kyoto	Japan	1983–1986	Alain L. de Weck	Switzerland
4.	1980	Paris	France	1980–1983	Baruj Benacerraf	United States
3.	1977	Sydney	Australia	1977–1980	Michael Sela	Poland/ Israel
2.	1974	Brighton	England	1974–1977	John Humphrey	United Kingdom
1.	1971	Washington, D.C.	United States	1971–1974	Bernard Cinader	Canada
Fd.	1969	Bruges	Belgium			

== Online immunology education ==
Immunohub is IUIS official education platform which hosts and restores all the educational content, including and not limited to IUIS Congresses recordings, Day of Immunology webinar, Women in Science webinar, etc. Immunopaedia is one of the educational provider of online pre-course material for IUIS immunology courses in the developing world and in other countries.

== See also ==
- Gustav Nossal
- Stefan H.E. Kaufmann
- Spanish Society for Immunology
- British Society for Immunology
- American Association of Immunologists
