= Miriam Merad =

Algerian professor (born 1969)

- Born: 1969 (age 56–57); Paris, France
- Education: University of Algiers; Paris Diderot University; Stanford University
- Known for: Research on macrophage and dendritic cell biology; Tissue-resident macrophages; Myeloid cells in cancer and inflammatory disease
- Title: · Dean for Translational Research and Therapeutic Innovation · Director, Marc and Jennifer Lipschultz Precision Immunology Institute · Chair, Department of Immunology and Immunotherapy · Robin Chemers Neustein Professor of Immunology
- Scientific career
- Fields: Immunology; Hematology; Cancer immunology; Cancer immunotherapy
- Workplaces: Icahn School of Medicine at Mount Sinai

Miriam Merad (born 1969) is an Algerian physician-scientist and immunologist whose research examines how myeloid cells regulate health and disease. She serves as Dean for Translational Research and Therapeutic Innovation and is Director of the Marc and Jennifer Lipschultz Precision Immunology Institute (PrIISM) at the Icahn School of Medicine at Mount Sinai (ISMMS) in New York, NY.

Merad is known for her research on the macrophage and dendritic cell arms of the myeloid lineage, including demonstrating the developmental origins of tissue-resident macrophages and revealing how distinct macrophage populations acquire specialized functions in different tissues. Her work has advanced understanding of how myeloid cells regulate tissue and organ development and function, inflammatory disease, and immune responses to cancer.

For these contributions, Merad was elected to the United States' National Academy of Sciences in 2020 and National Academy of Medicine in 2023.

== Education and career ==
Miriam Merad earned her M.D. from the medical school at the University of Algiers. She completed residency in hematology and oncology at Paris Diderot University and obtained a Master's degree in Biotechnology from Paris Diderot, then moved to Stanford University and earned a PhD in the laboratory of Edgar Engleman. Her clinical training was in hematology/oncology and bone marrow transplantation at Hôpital Saint-Louis and Institut Gustave Roussy.

Merad collaborated with Irving Weissman at Stanford with a focus on macrophage and dendritic cell ontogeny. She was recruited by ISMMS in 2004, and in 2014 was appointed an Endowed Chair in Cancer Immunology. In 2016, she was appointed Director of the Immunology Institute, and in August 2023, she became founding Chair of the Department of Immunology and Immunotherapy. The department focuses on immune system biology and its effects on health and disease. In April 2024, she was named Dean for Translational Research and Therapeutic Innovation.

== Research ==
Merad's early work identified mechanisms controlling the development and identity of tissue-resident dendritic cells and macrophages. Her laboratory established the embryonic origin of tissue-resident macrophages, microglia, and Langerhans cells. These cells contribute to synaptic pruning, gut peristalsis, fat metabolism, and vascular integrity. Her team identified tissue-resident CD103+ dendritic cells, which specialize in anti-viral and anti-tumor immunity.

Merad's group examines how myeloid cell subsets drive inflammatory diseases. In 2021, Bigenwald, et al., reported that mitogen-activated protein kinase pathway mutations trigger senescence in hematopoietic progenitors. This skews differentiation toward mononuclear phagocytes and causes multisystem Langerhans Cell Histiocytosis. In 2022, Chen, et al., and others reported that severe COVID-19 reduces tissue-resident lung alveolar macrophages, which aid repair, while increasing inflammatory monocytes and monocyte-derived macrophages.

Merad's laboratory explores dendritic cells and macrophages in the tumor microenvironment. Two macrophage lineages she defined appear in tumors. Their origins dictate roles in shaping the microenvironment. In human lung tumors, Casanova-Acebes, et al., reported in 2021 that tissue-resident macrophages cluster near early tumor cells. They increase invasiveness and activate regulatory T cells that shield tumors from immunity. As tumors grow, tissue-resident macrophages shift to the periphery. Monocyte-derived macrophages then dominate.

In 2023, Park, et al., and others reported that TREM2 tumor macrophages suppress immunity. They limit natural killer cell recruitment and activity in lung adenocarcinoma models. In 2020, Maier, et al., reported mature dendritic cells enriched in immunoregulatory molecules (mregDCs). These limit responses to immune checkpoint blockade. In 2023, Magen, et al., and others reported niches where mregDCs operate in tumors.

Merad's contributions to understanding the central role of myeloid cells in tumor development and immunity have been recognized with international awards, including the William B. Coley Award, the Sjöberg Prize and the Leopold Griffuel Prize.

In 2024, Park, et al., and others reported that aging shifts macrophages from protectors to disease drivers. They fuel cancer via immunosuppressive programs and promote neurodegeneration via senescent monocytes. In 2025, Park, et al., reported strategies to reprogram aging-linked immune cells for healthier longevity. Merad led a semi-finalist team in the XPRIZE Healthspan competition. Merad co-founded the International Immunoschool in 2015 with researchers from Sorbonne University in Paris, France, and University of São Paulo in Brazil. She published on cancer immunotherapy trials, Long COVID classification, immigrants' role in U.S. science, and experiences as a mother scientist.

== Awards and honors ==
- 2026 Member, Austrian Academy of Sciences
- 2025 Fellow, Accademia Nazionale dei Lincei
- 2025 Knighthood, French Legion of Honor
- 2025 Sjöberg Prize
- 2025 Member, Royal Academy of Medicine of Belgium
- 2024 Fellow, AACR
- 2024 INSERM International Prize
- 2024 Leopold Griffuel Prize
- 2023 Member, National Academy of Medicine
- 2023 Fellow, Society for Immunotherapy of Cancer Academy of Immuno-Oncology
- 2020 President of the International Union of Immunological Societies
- 2020 Honoree, Great Immigrants Award
- 2020 Member, National Academy of Sciences
- 2018 William B. Coley Award
- 2017 Highly Cited Researcher
- 2013 Member, American Society for Clinical Investigation.

== Notable publications ==
=== Primary research ===
- Merad, Miriam; Manz, Markus G.; Karsunky, Holger; Wagers, Amy; Peters, Wendy; Charo, Israel; Weissman, Irving L.; Cyster, Jason G.; Engleman, Edgar G. (2002). "Langerhans cells renew in the skin throughout life under steady-state conditions". Nature Immunology. 3 (12): 1135–1141. doi:10.1038/ni852. PMC 4727838. PMID 12415265.
- Ginhoux, F; Greter, M; Leboeuf, M; Nandi, S; Merad, M (2010). "Fate Mapping Analysis Reveals That Adult Microglia Derive from Primitive Macrophages". Science. 330 (6005): 841–845. Bibcode:2010Sci...330..841G. doi:10.1126/science.1194637. PMC 3719181. PMID 20966214.
- Hashimoto, D; Chow, A; Noizat, C; Teo, P; Merad, M (2013). "Tissue-resident macrophages self-maintain locally throughout adult life with minimal contribution from circulating monocytes". Immunity. 38 (4): 792–804. doi:10.1016/j.immuni.2013.04.004. PMC 3853406. PMID 23601688.
- Lavin, Y; Winter, D; Blecher-Gonen, R; David, E; Merad, M (2014). "Tissue-resident macrophage enhancer landscapes are shaped by the local microenvironment". Cell. 159 (6): 1312–1326. doi:10.1016/j.cell.2014.11.018. PMC 4437213. PMID 25480296.
- Lavin, Y; Merad, M (2019). "Innate Immune Landscape in Early Lung Adenocarcinoma by Paired Single-Cell Analyses". Cell. 169 (4): 750–765. doi:10.1016/j.cell.2017.04.014. PMC 5737939. PMID 28475900.
- Casanova-Acebes, M; Merad, M (2021). "Tissue-resident macrophages provide a pro-tumorigenic niche to early NSCLC cells". Nature. 595 (7868): 578–584. Bibcode:2021Natur.595..578C. doi:10.1038/s41586-021-03651-8. PMC 8923521. PMID 34135508.
- LaMarche, Nelson M.; Hegde, Samarth; Park, Matthew D.; Maier, Barbara B.; et al. (2024). "An IL-4 signalling axis in bone marrow drives pro-tumorigenic myelopoiesis". Nature. 625 (7993): 166–174. Bibcode:2024Natur.625..166L. doi:10.1038/s41586-023-06797-9. PMC 11189607. PMID 38057662.
- Park, Matthew D.; Le Berichel, Jessica; Hamon, Pauline; Wilk, Christopher M.; et al. (2024). "Hematopoietic aging promotes cancer by fueling IL-1α-driven emergency myelopoiesis". Science. 386 (6720) eadn0327. doi:10.1126/science.adn0327. PMC 7616710. PMID 39236155.

=== Reviews and perspectives ===
- Park, Matthew D.; Yatim, Nader; Zhang, Jing; Cho, Byuri Angela; Yoo, Seong-Keun; Schaefer, Maximilian M.; Chowell, Diego; Puleston, Daniel J.; Merad, Miriam (2025). "Restoring resident tissue macrophages to combat aging and cancer". Nature Aging. 5 (8): 1383–1392. doi:10.1038/s43587-025-00898-y. PMID 40813807.
- Park, M; Aymeric, S; Ginhoux, F; Merad, M (2023). "Macrophages in health and disease". Cell. 185 (23): 4259–4279. doi:10.1016/j.cell.2022.10.007. PMC 9908006. PMID 36368305.
- Salmon, Hélène; Remark, Romain; Gnjatic, Sacha; Merad, Miriam (2019). "Host tissue determinants of tumour immunity". Nature Reviews Cancer. 19 (4): 215–227. doi:10.1038/s41568-019-0125-9. PMC 7787168. PMID 30867580.
