= Jacob Birger Natvig =

Norwegian physician (1934–2021)

- Born: 6 December 1934; Oslo, Norway
- Died: 2 April 2021 (aged 86); Oslo, Norway
- Occupation: Physician
- Awards: Order of St. Olav

Jacob Birger Natvig (6 December 1934 – 2 April 2021) was a Norwegian physician, a pioneer in the field of immunology in Norway.

== Career ==
Born in Oslo, Natvig graduated as cand.med. in 1959, and as dr.med. in 1966. He worked as physician at the Oslo University Hospital, Rikshospitalet, from 1967 to 1977, and was then appointed director of the hospital from 1978 to 1986. From 1986 to 2004 he was professor of immunology at the University of Oslo.

Natvig was a member of the Norwegian Academy of Science and Letters from 1978. Natvig served as president of the International Union of Immunological Societies from 1989 to 1992, and he was founder and chairman of the board of the foundation Nasjonalt medisinsk museum. He was decorated Knight, First Class of the Order of St. Olav in 2009, for his contribution to medical research.

He died in Oslo on 2 April 2021.

== Selected works ==
- Medisinsk immunologi (with Morten Harboe; first edition 1975).
