= Osiier =

Osiier is a surname. Notable people with the surname include:

- Ellen Osiier (1890–1962), Danish fencer
- Ivan Joseph Martin Osiier (1888–1965), Danish fencer

== See also ==
- Osier (disambiguation)
