= Federation of Clinical Immunology Societies =

The Federation of Clinical Immunology Societies (FOCIS) was initially established as a cross-disciplinary meeting, holding its first Annual Meeting in 2001. It subsequently became a 501(c)(3) organization in 2003. Its mission is to improve human health through immunology by fostering interdisciplinary approaches to both understand and treat immune-based diseases. FOCIS currently has 58 Member Societies, representing roughly 65,000 clinician scientists. Its member societies include: American Academy of Allergy, Asthma, and Immunology, British Society for Immunology, European Academy of Allergy and Clinical Immunology, European Society for Primary Immunodeficiencies, and World Allergy Organization.
