= Journal of the Royal Society of Medicine =

- Discipline: Medicine
- Language: English
- Edited by: Kamran Abbasi

Publication details
- Former names: Proceedings of the Royal Society of Medicine, Medico-Chirurgical Transactions
- History: 1809–present
- Publisher: SAGE Publications (United Kingdom)
- Frequency: Monthly
- Open access: Hybrid
- Impact factor: 18.000 (2021)

Standard abbreviations
- ISO 4: J. R. Soc. Med.

Indexing
- CODEN: JRSMD9
- ISSN: 0141-0768 (print); 1758-1095 (web)
- LCCN: 78648718
- OCLC no.: 03722674
- Medico-Chirurgical Transactions
- ISSN: 0959-5287

Links
- Journal homepage; Online access; Online archive; Online archive at the National Library of Medicine

The Journal of the Royal Society of Medicine is a peer-reviewed medical journal. It is the flagship journal of the Royal Society of Medicine, located in London, with full editorial independence. Its continuous publication history dates back to 1809. Since July 2005 the editor-in-chief is Kamran Abbasi, who succeeded Robin Fox who was editor for almost 10 years.

== History ==
The journal was established in 1806 as the Medico-Chirurgical Transactions published by the Royal Medical and Chirurgical Society of London. It was renamed to Proceedings of the Royal Society of Medicine in 1907, following the merger that led to the formation of the Royal Society of Medicine and with volume numbering restarting at 1, before obtaining its current name in 1978.

== Abstracting and indexing ==
The journal is abstracted and indexed in MEDLINE/PubMed, Science Citation Index, EMBASE, CAB International, and Elsevier Biobase. According to the Journal Citation Reports, the journal has a 2021 impact factor of 18.000.

== Content ==
The journal describes itself as having "an international and multi-specialty readership that includes primary care and public health professionals". It claims to act as "a forum for debate, education, and entertainment for clinicians interested in UK medicine and relevant international developments and research. The aim of the journal is to influence clinical practice and policy making across the whole range of medicine". Each issue contains original research articles, editorials, reviews, and essays. The essay section brings together "think pieces" on current medical issues and medical history. The journal also includes book reviews. Each issue also features a selection of commentaries from the James Lind Library, an online resource for patients and professionals that documents the evolution of fair tests of treatments in health care.

In 2006, the journal introduced open peer review, a system in which authors and reviewers know each other's identities on the assumption that this improves openness in scientific discourse. This made it one of the few medical journals in the world with open peer review.

== Editions ==
The journal is published monthly. The full text of each issue is available to subscribers online on the journal's website at the beginning of each month.

== Open access ==
In March 2006 all research articles published, as well as all other content more than three years old, were made available for free online. An agreement with PubMed Central was also announced, in which a digitised archive of the journal and its predecessor would be created, with issues dating back to 1809 available online for free.
