= David Livermore (microbiologist) =

British microbiologist

David Livermore is professor of medical microbiology at the University of East Anglia.

After working at the London Hospital Medical College from 1980 to 1997, he joined the Public Health Laboratory Service (later PHE), and became director of its Antibiotic Resistance Monitoring and Reference Laboratory. He was appointed professor of medical microbiology at the University of East Anglia in 2011. His chief research has been on the evolution and epidemiology of antibiotic resistance.

In 2020, Livermore became a signatory to the Great Barrington Declaration.

On January 18, 2021, the Russian Direct Investment Fund and the Gamaleya National Center of Epidemiology and Microbiology announced the appointment of Livermore to their International Scientific Advisory Board for the Sputnik V vaccine.

As of April 2021, he was a member of the Health Advisory and Recovery Team, a British pressure group opposed to COVID-19 mitigation measures and COVID-19 vaccines. In September 2023, he raised doubts about the conviction of Lucy Letby.
