= Kardashian index =

Citation metric

The Kardashian index (K-index), named after media personality Kim Kardashian, is a satirical measure of the discrepancy between a scientist's social media profile and publication record. Proposed by Neil Hall in 2014, the measure compares the number of followers a research scientist has on Twitter to the number of citations they have for their peer-reviewed work.

== Definition ==
The relationship between the expected number of Twitter followers $F$ given the number of citations $C$ is described as
$$F(C) = 43.3\,C^{0.32},$$

which is derived from the Twitter accounts and citation counts of a "randomish selection of 40 scientists" in 2014. The Kardashian index is thus calculated as
$$\text{K-index} = \frac{F_a}{F(C)},$$

where $F_a$ is the actual number of Twitter followers of researcher $X$, and $F(C)$ is the number that researcher should have, given their citations.

== Interpretation ==
A high K-index indicates an over-blown scientific fame, while a low K-index suggests that a scientist is being undervalued. According to the author Hall, researchers whose K-index > 5 can be considered "Science Kardashians". Hall wrote:

I propose that all scientists calculate their own K-index on an annual basis and include it in their Twitter profile. Not only does this help others decide how much weight they should give to someone's 140 character wisdom, it can also be an incentive – if your K-index gets above 5, then it's time to get off Twitter and write those papers.

Hall also added "a serious note" noticing the gender disparity in his sample. Of 14 female scientists, 11 had lower than predicted K-indices, while only one of the high-index scientists was female.

On February 11, 2022, on Twitter, Neil Hall stated that he intended the Kardashian index to be a "dig at metrics not Kardashians" and that "the entire premise is satire".

== Response ==
Many jocular indices of scientific productivity were proposed in the immediate aftermath of publication of the K-index paper. The Tesla index measured social isolation of scientists relative to their productivity, named after Nikola Tesla, whose work was hugely influential, while he remained a social recluse. People tweeted suggestions hashtagged #alternatesciencemetrics.

In 2022, John Ioannidis authored a paper in The BMJ arguing that signatories of the Great Barrington Declaration about how to deal with the COVID-19 pandemic were shunned as a fringe minority by those in favor of the John Snow Memorandum. According to him, the latter used their large numbers of followers on Twitter and other social media and op-eds to shape a scientific "groupthink" against the former, who had less influence. The version of the index that Ioannidis used Scopus citations instead of Google Scholar citations, since many of the signatories had no Google Scholar pages.

The K-index suggests that the number of citations of a given scientist is comparable to their scientific value. This assumption has been criticized.

The proposal of the K-index has been interpreted as a criticism to the assumption that scientists should have a social media impact at all, while in reality, social media footprint has no correlation to the scientific quality or scientific impact.

== See also ==
- Academic authorship
- Attention inequality

== Bibliography ==
- Francisco, Mikael Angelo (2014-07-31). "The Kardashian Index: A scientific measure of unwarranted fame". GMA Network. Archived from the original on 2014-10-11.
- Staff writer (2014-08-05). "Scientist proposes Kardashian Index". Yahoo! News. Press Association. Archived from the original on 2014-10-11.
- Larki, Shadan (2014-08-05). "The 'Kardashian index' measures researchers' social clout". The Daily Dot. Archived from the original on 2014-10-11.
- Woolston, Chris (2014-08-14). "Clash over the Kardashians of science". Nature. 512 (17): 517. Bibcode:2014Natur.512..117W. doi:10.1038/512117e.
- Parr, Chris (2014-08-14). "Kardashian Index: the academics famous just for being famous". Times Higher Education. Archived from the original on 2014-10-11.
- Steinbauer, Von Anna (2014-09-22). ""Kardashian"-Index in der Wissenschaft". Süddeutsche Zeitung. Archived from the original on 2014-10-11.
