= Deepti Gurdasani =

British-Indian epidemiologist

- Education: Tamil Nadu Dr. M.G.R. Medical University (MBBS, MD); Wolfson College, Cambridge (MPhil, PhD); Queen Mary University of London (PGCert)
- Scientific career
- Institutions: Queen Mary University of London; Wellcome Sanger Institute
- Thesis: Design Strategies in the Study of Genetics of Complex Disease in Diverse Populations (2014)
- Website: www.qmul.ac.uk/whri/people/academic-staff/items/gurdasanideepti.html

Deepti Gurdasani is a British-Indian clinical epidemiologist and statistical geneticist who is a senior lecturer in machine learning at the Queen Mary University of London. Her research considers the genetic diversity of African Populations. Throughout the COVID-19 pandemic, Gurdasani has provided the public with her analysis of the evolving situation mainly on the Twitter platform.

== Early life and education ==
Gurdasani was an undergraduate and medical student at the Christian Medical College Vellore at Tamil Nadu Dr. M.G.R. Medical University. After earning her medical degree and qualifying in internal medicine, she moved to the United Kingdom, where she worked toward a research doctorate in genetic epidemiology at Wolfson College, Cambridge. Her doctoral research involved the design of strategies to understand complex diseases in diverse populations.

== Research and career ==
In 2013, Gurdasani joined the Wellcome Sanger Institute as a postdoctoral fellow, where she worked on the genomic diversity of African populations and how this diversity impacts susceptibility to disease. She makes use of dense genotypes and whole genome sequences to better understand how population movements determined genetic structure. In particular, Gurdasani develops machine learning algorithms to large-scale clinical data sets. At the Sanger Gurdasani co-led the African Genome Variation Project and the Uganda Resource Project.

Gurdasani moved to Queen Mary University of London in 2019, where she created deep learning approaches for clinical prediction and the identification of novel, genome-based drug targets. During the COVID-19 pandemic Gurdasani has provided public commentary on the pandemic, making use of both Twitter and print media to share information on the evolving situation. She has researched the incidence of long covid in the UK. In 2021 Gurdasani started to write for The Guardian.

== Selected publications ==
- Deepti Gurdasani; Tommy Carstensen; Fasil Tekola-Ayele; et al. (3 December 2014). "The African Genome Variation Project shapes medical genetics in Africa". Nature. 517 (7534): 327–332. doi:10.1038/NATURE13997. ISSN 1476-4687. PMC 4297536. PMID 25470054. Wikidata Q34979569.
- Nisreen A Alwan; Rochelle Ann Burgess; Simon Ashworth; et al. (15 October 2020). "Scientific consensus on the COVID-19 pandemic: we need to act now". The Lancet. doi:10.1016/S0140-6736(20)32153-X. ISSN 0140-6736. PMC 7557300. PMID 33069277. Wikidata Q100697134.
- Deepti Gurdasani; Inês Barroso; Eleftheria Zeggini; Manjinder S Sandhu (24 June 2019). "Genomics of disease risk in globally diverse populations". Nature Reviews Genetics. 20 (9): 520–535. doi:10.1038/S41576-019-0144-0. ISSN 1471-0056. PMID 31235872. Wikidata Q93000887. (erratum)
