= James Elwood =

British physician (1921–2021)

James Stanley Elwood (c. December 1921 – 13 December 2021) was a British pathologist who was responsible for 222 cancer misdiagnoses between 1995 and 2000. During this period, he was practising as a locum at four NHS trusts: the Princess Margaret Hospital, Swindon, the Royal United Hospital Bath NHS Trust, the Mid-Sussex NHS Trust and the Frimley Park Hospitals NHS Trust. He also worked in Tralee.

Among the patients who received faulty diagnoses was archaeologist Carenza Lewis, who later spoke publicly about the consequences of the resulting unnecessary surgery. Elwood was not subject to any disciplinary procedures, having removed his name from the British medical register. He initially refused to co-operate with the investigation of his misdiagnoses by not divulging the details of his medical career.

Elwood graduated with bachelor's degrees in medicine, surgery and obstetrics (MB BCh BAO) with second class honours from the Queen's University of Belfast in 1943. He proceeded to a doctorate (MD) in 1947 with a thesis titled "A study of the incidence and aetiology of pulmonary complications following anaesthesia and surgical operations." He obtained a diploma in clinical pathology (DCP) from the University of London in 1947, a diploma in pathology (DPath) from the Conjoint Board for England in 1952, and became a Fellow of the Royal College of Pathologists (FRCPath) in 1966. The Medical Directory for 2007 lists him as having previously been a civilian consultant pathologist at the Cambridge Military Hospital at Aldershot.

Elwood died in Gloucestershire on 13 December 2021.
