= Florian Krammer =

Austrian-American virologist

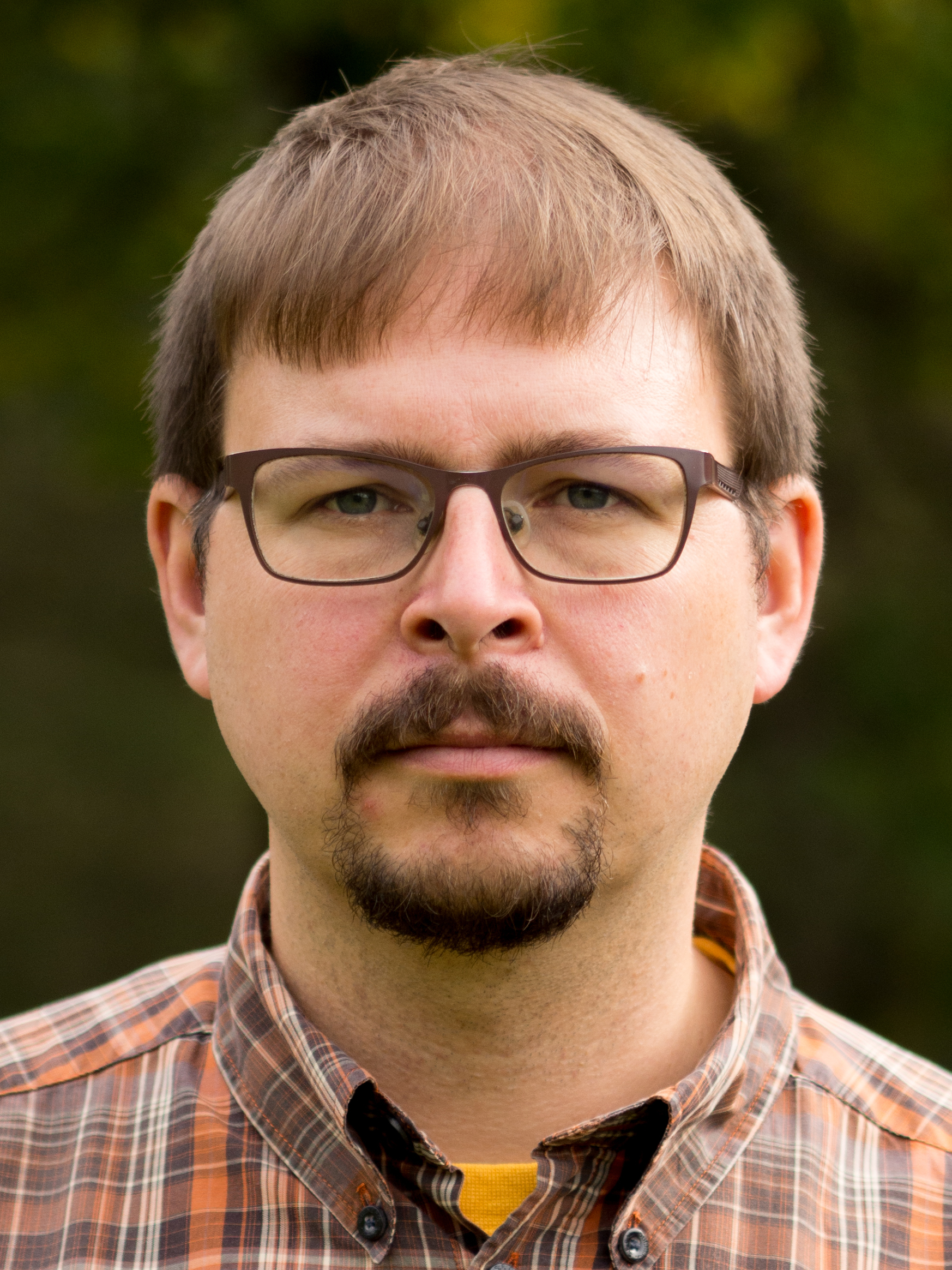
Florian Krammer

Florian Krammer is an Austrian-American virologist who has been Endowed Professor of Vaccinology at the Icahn School of Medicine at Mount Sinai since 2019. He was trained at the University of Natural Resources and Life Sciences in Vienna, Austria, where his mentor was Reingard Grabherr. He then completed his postdoc at Icahn under the supervision of Peter Palese. He has been the principal investigator of the Sinai-Emory Multi-Institutional Collaborative Influenza Vaccine Innovation Center (CIVIC) since 2019.
