= British Society for Immunology =

- British Society for Immunology logo
- Founded: November 1956
- Founders: John H. Humphrey, Robin Coombs, Bob White, Avrion Mitchison, John Anderson
- Type: Biomedical society
- Location: London
- Region served: Immunology
- Key people: Professor Peter Openshaw
- Website: www.immunology.org

The British Society for Immunology, or BSI, is a UK-based organisation of British immunologists but accepts members from all countries. It was founded in November 1956 by John H. Humphrey, Robin Coombs, Bob White, and Avrion Mitchison and is one of the oldest and largest Immunology societies in the world and the largest in Europe. It publishes three scientific journals: Discovery Immunology, Immunotherapy Advances, and Clinical and Experimental Immunology.

BSI members work throughout the entire Immunology chain, stretching from the laboratory bench through to the clinics and hospitals in which patients are treated. The fields in which they work are diverse, from HIV/AIDS to allergy, diabetes, malaria, tuberculosis, animal health, arthritis, transplantation, vaccination and infectious disease.

The BSI’s main objective is to promote and support excellence in research, scholarship and clinical practice in immunology for the benefit of human and animal health and welfare. The BSI seeks to help British Immunology accomplish the highest possible goals.

To meet this objective, the BSI undertakes the following:

- Running innovative events in research, public engagement and education
- Promoting and disseminating research and good practice in Immunology, translational medicine and vaccination
- Working with its members to develop the benefits of membership and the relevance of the Society
- Providing bursaries and grants
- Enhancing public awareness of immunology
- Influencing policy and decision makers
- Working with other societies

The BSI's flagship event is BSI Congress, a scientific meeting which is held two out of every three years (not running in the year that the European Congress of Immunology is held). BSI Congress attracts over 1,500 immunologists, and has been running since 1993.

The incumbent President of the Board of Trustees is Professor Peter Openshaw (Imperial College London)

The Board of Trustees is composed of: Dr Lindsay Nicholson (University of Bristol), Professor Anne Cooke (University of Cambridge), Professor Robert Barker (University of Aberdeen), Dr Leonie Taams (King's College London), Dr Diane Williamson (DSTL), Dr Bill Egner (Sheffield Teaching Hospitals NHS Foundation Trust), Dr Sheena Cruickshank (University of Manchester)

== Affiliated Societies ==
The BSI is a member society of the following organisations:

- Federation of Clinical Immunology Societies
- International Union of Immunological Societies
- European Federation of Immunological Studies
- World Allergy Organization
- Royal Society of Biology

== See also ==
- Spanish Society for Immunology
- International Union of Immunological Societies
- American Association of Immunologists
