= South Asian Health Foundation =

- Formation: 1999
- Registration no.: 1073178
- Location: United Kingdom
- Key people: Kiran Patel, Naren Patel, Kamran Abbasi
- Website: https://www.sahf.org.uk/

The South Asian Health Foundation (SAHF) is a charity in the United Kingdom (UK), founded in 1999 by Kiran Patel and established to improve the health of the UK's South Asian population. In 2015, it was named ‘Diabetes Team of the Year’ at the 2015 British Medical Journal awards.
