= Osier, Michigan =

- Unincorporated community
- Location within the state of Michigan
- Coordinates: 46°06′56″N 87°00′05″W
- Country: United States
- State: Michigan
- County: Delta
- Township: Maple Ridge
- Time zone: UTC-5 (Eastern (EST))
  - Summer (DST): UTC-4 (EDT)
- ZIP code(s): 49878
- Area code: 906
- GNIS feature ID: 168163

Osier is an unincorporated community in Delta County, in the U.S. state of Michigan.

== History ==
A post office was established at Osier in 1898, closed in 1901, reopened in 1910, and closed permanently in 1927. Osier was named from a grove of willow (commonly known as osier) trees near the town site.
