= Sheena Cruickshank =

British immunologist

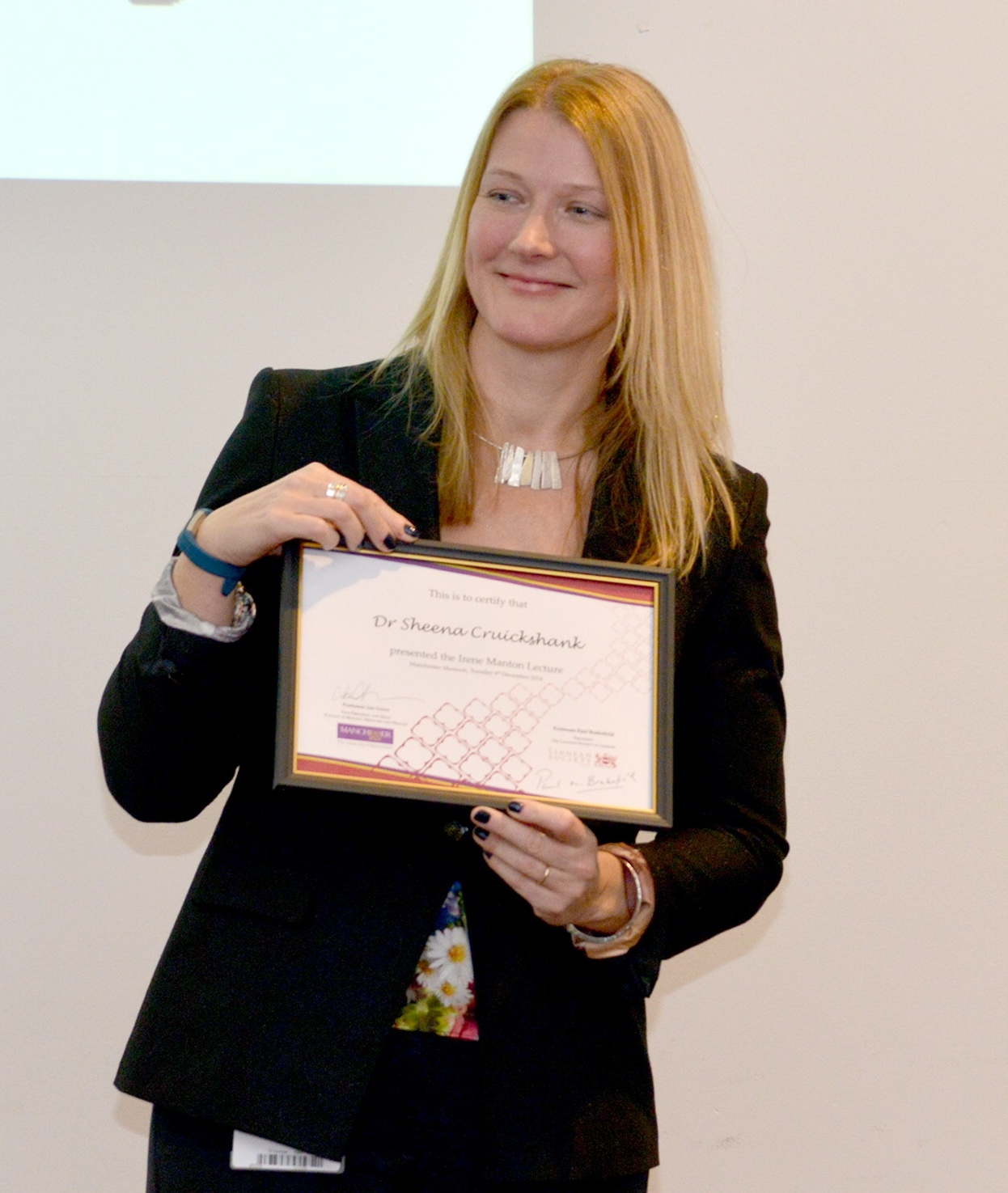
- Born: Sheena Margaret Cruickshank
- Education: Strathclyde University (BSc); University of Leeds (PhD)
- Known for: Immunology; Public engagement
- Scientific career
- Fields: Mucosal immunology
- Workplaces: University of Manchester
- Thesis: The effects of pleiotropic cytokines on liver cells in vitro (1998)
- Website: www.mig.manchester.ac.uk/people/sheenacruickshank

Sheena Margaret Cruickshank is a British immunologist and Professor in Biomedical Sciences and Public Engagement at the University of Manchester. She researches how immune responses of the gut are started as a result of infection and/or inflammation. Cruickshank is a science communicator.

== Education ==
Cruickshank completed a Bachelor's degree in Biochemistry & Immunology at Strathclyde University. She earned a PhD in immunology in 1998 from the University of Leeds for research investigating the effects of pleiotropic cytokines on liver cells.

== Research and career ==
Since 2007 Cruickshank has worked in the Department of Immunology at the University of Manchester. She uses in vitro and in vivo approaches to characterise crosstalk between immune cells, commensal bacteria, pathogens and epithelial cells. These experiments make use of infectious models, including Toxoplasma gondii and Trichuris muris, to understand immunity regulation in the skin and gut. By identifying how the skin and gut recognise and respond to the microbiome, they are starting to understand how it affects cell function. Cruickshank won the Northwest BioNow award for her test for the management and assessment of Inflammatory Bowel Disease.

BBC Radio 4 broadcast in 2018 in the series The Life Scientific Sheena Cruickshank's reflections on her life and career. Her brother was passionate about science and particularly marine biology which inspired her to have an interest in science from an early age. His subsequent illness with cancer and death at a young age was a series of events that helped shape her curiosity about the immune system and why diseases happen.

=== Public engagement ===
In 2009, Cruickshank co-created the Worm Wagon, "an interactive program that merges art and science activities to promote awareness of parasitic worm infection". She later created the Wiggling Rangoli, exploring parasites and how parasitic infections impacts people around the world. Cruickshank created the citizen science app Britain Breathing, which teaches the impacts of air pollution. The app maps the incidence of allergies and asthma, and uses data to explore why allergies are increasing and the role of air pollution in allergy development. She is a trustee of and the Public Engagement Secretary for the British Society for Immunology. She has appeared on the BBC and CNN. Cruickshank is interested in ways to empower migrant communities with science using English classes.

She acts as academic lead for public engagement at the University of Manchester where she has developed their public engagement strategy and is working to enhance public engagement support and development at the University of Manchester. She blogs about the University of Manchester public engagement.

=== Awards and honours ===
In 2013 she won Royal Society of Biology Communicator of the Year and the Manchester International Women’s Day Award in Women & Science, Technology, Engineering and Mathematics. She was a finalist in the 2014 NCCPE Engage and 2016 Biotechnology and Biological Sciences Research Council (BBSRC) Innovator competitions. In 2014 she spoke at QEDcon, a two day skepticism and pop-science conference. In 2016 she introduced Manchester's Science in the City festival. She was a keynote speaker at the 2017 Bluedot Festival. She spoke at New Scientist Live 2017. Cruickshank was a 2017 Cosmic Superhero, a photographic exhibition at Conway Hall Ethical Society. She spoke about the microbiome at TEDx Manchester in Bridgewater Hall, her talk was called Eat Yourself Healthy.

She won the 2017 Better World and Making a Difference Award for Social Responsibility Award. She is a 2017-18 American Association for the Advancement of Science (AAAS) Leshner Leadership Institute Public Engagement Fellow.
