= Merle Sande =

American infectiologist (1939–2007)

- Born: September 2, 1939
- Died: November 14, 2007 (aged 68); Seattle, WA
- Education: Washington State University; University of Washington
- Known for: infectious diseases
- Scientific career
- Fields: medicine

Merle Alden Sande (September 2, 1939 – November 4, 2007) was a leading American infectious-diseases expert whose early recognition of the looming public health crisis posed by AIDS led to the development of basic protocols for how to handle infected patients. He graduated from Washington State University and received his MD degree from the University of Washington, School of Medicine in Seattle.

== Biography ==
Sande was a professor of Internal Medicine from 1971 to 1980 at the University of Virginia, where he performed research in mice on bacterial meningitis therapies such as novel antibiotics and corticosteroids. Dr Sande was Chief of Medical Services at San Francisco General Hospital in 1981 when he recognized a pattern of gay men being admitted with the rare pneumocystis pneumonia. His efforts on behalf of these patients resulted in the formation of an AIDS ward at San Francisco General Hospital and later an AIDS outpatient clinic. Teaming with such experts as Julie Gerberding and Paul Volberding he helped to craft what became known as the San Francisco model of AIDS therapy, a comprehensive, rational approach to care that avoided the fear and paranoia surrounding the disease at that time. The model addressed a need for infection-control guidelines, clinical studies and research financing and became a template for AIDS centers nationwide. Sande helped found to the Gladstone Institute of Virology and Immunology, which performed trials on some of the first anti-retrovirals such as zidovudine.

He also helped to found the Infectious Diseases Institute at the Makerere University College of Health Sciences in Kampala, Uganda a major center for HIV education and research in Africa. Sande was a professor of Medicine at University of California, San Francisco from 1980 to 1996, chairman of the department internal medicine at University of Utah from 1996 to 2005 and Professor of medicine at University of Washington from 2005 until his death and president of the Infectious Diseases Society of America from 1993 to 1994. He was also the editor of two highly regarded medical references The Medical Management of AIDS and The Sanford Guide to Antimicrobial Therapy.

... The Medical Management of AIDS, which he co-edited with Paul Volberding, went through six editions and was the leading book in this area

Sande gave in 2003 the Jeremiah Metzger Lecture and in 2004 the Wesley Spink Memorial Lecture. He also gave the always popular and well attended annual update in Infectious Diseases at the American College of Physicians annual meeting as well as the clinical case presentations at the Infectious Diseases Society of America annual meeting. Sande died from complications of Multiple Myeloma in 2007.

== Selected bibliography ==
- Sande, Merle A; Ronald Allan (July 2004). "Treatment of HIV/AIDS: do the dilemmas only increase?". JAMA. 292 (2): 266–8. doi:10.1001/jama.292.2.266. PMID 15249576.
- Trachtenberg, Joel D; Sande Merle A (July 2002). "Emerging resistance to nonnucleoside reverse transcriptase inhibitors: a warning and a challenge". JAMA. 288 (2): 239–41. doi:10.1001/jama.288.2.239. PMID 12095382.
