= Bobbie Jacobson =

Bobbie Jacobson OBE, FFPH
- Born: Roberta Anne Jacobson; 1950 (age 75–76)
- Occupation: Public health physician

Roberta Anne Jacobson (born 1950), known as Bobbie, is a British public health physician.

Jacobson graduated with a degree in biochemistry from the University of Sussex in 1972, then undertook medical training at the Middlesex Hospital Medical School, qualifying in 1982.

She worked as deputy director of Action on Smoking and Health from 1973 to 1977, then after a period as a junior hospital doctor was appointed a research fellow in health promotion at the London School of Hygiene and Tropical Medicine in 1985.

She was a consultant in public health medicine for City and Hackney Health Authority from 1989 to 1990, then director of public health there from 1990 to 1993, and for East London and the City Health Authority from 1993 to 2001.

She was director of the London Health Observatory from 2001 to 2013.

She was made an Officer of the Order of the British Empire (OBE) in the 2006 New Year Honours, "For services to Public Health"; and was elected a Fellow of the Faculty of Public Health (FFPH) in 1996.

In 2013, she gave the inaugural lecture of the Global Public Health Observatory.
