= Immunology (journal) =

- Discipline: Immunology
- Language: English
- Edited by: Greg Delgoffe

Publication details
- History: 1958–present
- Publisher: Wiley-Blackwell
- Frequency: Monthly
- Impact factor: 7.397 (2020)

Standard abbreviations
- ISO 4: Immunology

Indexing
- CODEN: IMMUAM
- ISSN: 0019-2805 (print); 1365-2567 (web)
- LCCN: 59037544
- OCLC no.: 265405229

Links
- Journal homepage; Online access; Online archive

Immunology is a monthly peer-reviewed medical journal covering all aspects of immunology. The editor-in-chief is Greg Delgoffe (University of Pittsburgh). It was established in 1958 and is published by Wiley-Blackwell. Through 2021, Immunology was an official journal of the British Society for Immunology.

== Abstracting and indexing ==
The journal is abstracted and indexed in:

- Academic Search
- AGRICOLA
- Aquatic Sciences & Fisheries Abstracts
- Biological Abstracts
- BIOSIS Previews
- CAB Abstracts
- CABDirect
- Current Contents/Clinical Medicine
- Embase
- Global Health
- Index Medicus/MEDLINE/PubMed
- Index Veterinarius
- Science Citation Index
- Veterinary Bulletin
- VINITI Database RAS

According to the Journal Citation Reports, the journal has a 2020 impact factor of 7.397.
