= We Want Them Infected =

2023 book by Jonathan Howard

We Want Them Infected: How the Failed Quest for Herd Immunity Led Doctors to Embrace the Anti-Vaccine Movement and Blinded Americans to the Threat of Covid
- "We Want Them Infected" book cover
- Author: Jonathan Howard
- Language: English
- Subject: Virology, Medical science, medical history
- Publisher: Redhawk Publications
- Publication date: April 20, 2023
- Media type: Print (audiobook and Kindle)
- Pages: 606
- ISBN: 978-1959346036
- Followed by: Everyone Else Is Lying to You: A Damning Archive of Science Denial

We Want Them Infected: How the Failed Quest for Herd Immunity Led Doctors to Embrace the Anti-Vaccine Movement and Blinded Americans to the Threat of Covid is a 2023 book by Jonathan Howard, an American professor of neurology and psychiatry at New York University Grossman School of Medicine. The book examines the Great Barrington Declaration (GBD), an open letter advocating for herd immunity for COVID-19, which was published in October 2020 by Sunetra Gupta, Jay Bhattacharya and Martin Kulldorff. The book was published by Redhawk Publications and was released on April 20, 2023.

Howard has previously published several clinical textbooks in neurology and hosts the podcast "We Want Them Infected", which covers disinformation about the health field. The title of the book was taken from epidemiologist Paul Alexander who served in the Health and Human Services Department during the first Trump administration.

== Synopsis ==
The American Institute for Economic Research (AIER) located in Great Barrington, Massachusetts gathered public health academics in October 2020 to discuss a plan for the management of the COVID-19 pandemic. The AIER is a libertarian think tank which is known for spreading misinformation concerning climate change and health. AIER advocated for allowing the 60% of the population that does not have health risks to contract COVID in order to create herd immunity and end precautionary measures such as closures, masking and social distancing. AIER suggested that the 40% who were elderly or had health risks could be kept isolated from the remainder of the population and have food delivered for free. They also assumed that once a person had survived COVID, they would be immune to reinfection and that those without health risks would survive COVID without risk or long-term injury. An open letter was drafted and signed by three, only one of whom is a physician, and it is "unclear whether he ever cared for patients after completing medical school", according to a review by Bruce Werness in the Global Autism Review. The three are Sunetra Gupta (Oxford), Jay Bhattacharya (Stanford) and Martin Kulldorff (Harvard). The document was released publicly October 2020, pre-vaccines. Werness adds that, "It does not include any scientific analysis or modeling and was not peer-reviewed."

Howard argues that this plan is "unscientific, impracticable, and dangerous" and details that health experts such as Tedros Adhanom Ghebreyesus, Anthony Fauci, David Nabarro, Devi Sridhar, David Gorski and others criticized the plan. Howard writes that the pro-herd immunity community mocked preventive measures, held a "blasé attitude toward sick children", argued that children were unlikely to die or having lasting effects from COVID, and that therefore it was their duty to become infected. The group asserted that the fear of COVID was worse than the virus itself and that there was too much emphasis on COVID numbers, which they argued were exaggerated. Howard gives harsh criticism towards the signers, stating that they gave no thought to the logistics of how 40% of the population was to be isolated from the public for months at a time. Multi-generational households would have to move people with health risks to hotel rooms, and it was suggested feeding them with Door Dash deliveries. Also he criticizes suggestions that medical personal were not heroic, death certificates were filled out incorrectly, and hospitals and doctors were benefiting financially by over-diagnosing COVID. Howard quips "The idea that the best way to protect yourself from a virus is to get the virus is like using pregnancy as a form of contraception," and that herd immunity supporters "deliberately recycled and repurposed tropes from the AIDS pandemic."

Once COVID vaccines became available, the "natural" herd immunity supporters spread misinformation and continued to downplay the pandemic. When challenged, they cried that they had been misunderstood and misquoted. Howard writes "'They falsely pacified millions of Americans about the dangers of COVID... relentlessly minimized the virus for young people, and trashed any and all measures to limit infections in this population.'" The last third of the book discusses how anti-vaccine arguments that were previously used against the MMR and HPV vaccines were repurposed by doctors to cast doubt on the COVID vaccine, especially for children.

The title of the book was taken from wording by epidemiologist Paul Alexander who served in the Health and Human Services Department during the first Trump administration. In July 2020 he stated to top HHS officials that, "Infants, kids, teens, young people, young adults, middle aged with no conditions etc. have zero to little risk". "So we use them to develop herd ... we want them infected."

== Reception ==
Chief Scientific advisor for Global Autoimmune Institute Bruce Werness wrote that he read We Want Them Infected after the 2024 presidential election and wrote that he found it "disconcerting and even frightening to watch many of the individuals exposed in Dr. Howard's book being nominated for important health posts in the incoming administration."

Christopher Lane writing for Psychology Today calls We Want Them Infected detailed and "A gripping, cautionary tale about the dangers of mainstreaming fringe ideas before turning them into federal policy, We Want Them Infected is damning, indispensable, and one-of-a-kind. It is likely to become canonical."

Journalist Michael Hiltzik writing for the Los Angeles Times calls the book "painstakingly documented" and said that it "may be the most appalling and infuriating book you'll read about America's response to the pandemic. It's also essential reading."
