= Kulldorff =

Kulldorff is a surname. Notable people with the surname include:

- Gunnar Kulldorff (1927–2015), Swedish statistician, father of Martin Kulldorff
- Martin Kulldorff (born 1962), Swedish biostatistician, son of Gunnar Kulldorff
