= Libertopia =

Annual libertarian festival/conference

Libertopia was an annual libertarian festival/conference held in San Diego. It was organized by the Libertalia Foundation, a 501(c)(3) tax-exempt nonprofit organization, "dedicated to spreading the principles of free-market economics and voluntaryism". The festival particularly attracted those interested in "small-government": minarchists, voluntaryists, agorists, and anarchists. The events included speeches, films, music, and an awards banquet where two individuals are presented "The Sovereign Awards for Lifetime Achievement" for their contributions towards the advancement of individuality and voluntaryism. The event was most recently held in 2018, but has not been held since.

Past gatherings and masters of ceremonies included:

- 2010 (Oct 15–17) – Richard B. Boddie, Richard Stein (evening)
- 2011 (Oct 21–23) – Stefan Molyneux
- 2012 (Oct 11–14) – Stefan Molyneux
- 2013 (Aug 28–Sep 2) – Jeffrey Tucker
- 2014 (Nov 13–Nov 16) – Jeffrey Tucker
