= SaTScan =

Software for spatial, temporal, and space-time scan statistics

- Developer: Martin Kulldorff
- Release: 1997
- Operating system: Cross-platform
- Type: Spatial analysis; Epidemiology; Cluster analysis
- Website: www.satscan.org

SaTScan is a software tool that employs scan statistics for the spatial and temporal analysis of clusters of events. The software is trademarked by Martin Kulldorff, and was designed originally for public health and epidemiology to identify clusters of cases in both space (geographical location) and time and to perform statistical analysis to determine if these clusters are significantly different from what would be expected by chance The software provides a user-friendly interface and a range of statistical methods, making it accessible to researchers and practitioners. While not a full Geographic Information System, the outputs from SaTScan can be integrated with software such as ArcGIS or QGIS to visualize and analyze spatial data, and to map the distribution of various phenomena.

== Analysis ==
SaTScan employs scan statistics to identify clusters of space and time phenomena. Scan statistics use regularly shaped windows (usually circles) of varying sizes to evaluate a study area. Within each window, the software computes if the phenomena within is significantly different than expected compared to the area outside the window.

SaTScan can analyze data retrospectively or prospectively. It can look at the data spatially, temporally, or simultaneously incorporate both space and time. SaTScan can incorporate numerous probability models, including Poisson distribution, Bernoulli distribution, Monte Carlo method, and multinomial distribution. Using these, it can look for areas of higher and lower occurrences of phenomena than expected.

Results are output into a variety of formats, including ESRI Shapefile, HTML, and KML.

== History ==
SaTScan was developed by a group of epidemiologists and statisticians led by Martin Kulldorff, a Swedish biostatistician professor of medicine at Harvard Medical School. Version 1.0 of the software was first released in 1997 and has since become a widely used tool in the field of public health research and practice.

SaTScan was developed in response to a growing need for sophisticated tools to analyze disease outbreaks. Before the development of SaTScan, few tools were available that could effectively analyze the spatial and temporal patterns of disease, making it difficult for public health authorities to respond effectively to outbreaks.

Since its release, SaTScan has been used in many public health research studies, including infectious diseases, cancers, and other conditions. Public health authorities and disease surveillance systems have also adopted the software in many countries, and it has broad applications for other types of data.

SaTScan was used extensively by researchers during the COVID-19 pandemic.

== Applications ==
=== Epidemiology ===
SaTScan was originally developed for epidemiology and public health. Since its release, SaTScan has been used in many public health research studies involving GIS, including infectious diseases, cancers, and other conditions. Public health authorities and disease surveillance systems have also adopted the software in many countries.

=== Agriculture ===
SaTScan can identify areas of high pest or disease risk, informing crop and livestock management and disease control efforts.

=== Astronomy ===
SaTScan can also be adapted and applied to certain astronomical studies, particularly those that involve analyzing spatial and temporal patterns in astronomical data. For example, SaTScan could identify clustering patterns in the distribution of galaxies or other astronomical objects, such as stars.

=== Criminology ===
SaTScan can identify hot spots and patterns in crime data, which can assist law enforcement agencies in allocating resources and developing crime reduction strategies.

=== Environmental monitoring ===
SaTScan can identify areas of environmental concern, such as high levels of air pollution or water contamination.

=== Wildlive surveillance ===
SaTScan can identify areas of high risk for wildlife diseases, which can inform disease management and conservation efforts.

== See also ==
- AM/FM/GIS
- Automotive navigation system
- Collaborative mapping
- Comparison of GIS software
- Concepts and Techniques in Modern Geography
- Counter-mapping
- Distributed GIS
- GISCorps
- GIS Day
- Internet GIS
- List of GIS data sources
- List of GIS software
- Map database management
- Participatory GIS
- Quantitative geography
- Technical geography
- Web GIS
