= David Heath (probabilist) =

- Born: Oak Park, Illinois, U.S.
- Died: 11 August 2011 (aged 67–68); Penfield, New York, U.S.
- Education: Kalamazoo College (BA); University of Illinois Urbana-Champaign (PhD)
- Spouse: Judith Heath
- Children: Kelley, Michael, Susan
- Scientific career
- Fields: Probability Theory, Econometrics
- Workplaces: University of Minnesota; Cornell University; Carnegie-Mellon University
- Doctoral advisor: Frank Bardsley Knight
- Doctoral students: Martin Kulldorff

David Clay Heath (~1943 – 11 August 2011) was an American probabilist known for co-inventing the Heath–Jarrow–Morton framework to model the evolution of the interest rate curve.

== Biography ==
=== Early life ===
He was born in Oak Park, Illinois, to W. Curtis and Margaret Wasson Heath. He graduated from Elkhart High School in 1960 and earned his bachelor's degree from Kalamazoo College in 1964.

=== Scientific career ===
Heath obtained his PhD in mathematics in 1969 under the supervision of Frank Bardsley Knight at the University of Illinois Urbana-Champaign with a dissertation titled 'Probabilistic Analysis of Hyperbolic Systems of Partial Differential Equations'. After graduation, he became an assistant professor at the University of Minnesota. In the late 1970s, he moved to Cornell University where he joined the School of Operations Research and Industrial Engineering. There he founded the financial engineering program, becoming the Merrill Lynch Professor of Financial Engineering. In the late 1990s Heath moved to Carnegie Mellon University in Pittsburgh, where he became the Orion Hoch Professor of Mathematical Sciences, and where he stayed until his retirement in 2006.

== Selected bibliography ==
- Heath, David C., and William D. Sudderth. "On a theorem of de Finetti, oddsmaking, and game theory." The Annals of Mathematical Statistics 43, number 6 (1972): pages 2072-2077.
- Berry, Donald A., David C. Heath, and William D. Sudderth. "Red-and-black with unknown win probability." The Annals of Statistics 2, number 3 (1974): pages 602-608.
- Heath, David, and William Sudderth. "On finitely additive priors, coherence, and extended admissibility." The Annals of Statistics (1978): pages 333-345.
- Billera, Louis J., David C. Heath, and Joseph Raanan. "Internal telephone billing rates—a novel application of non-atomic game theory." Operations Research 26, number 6 (1978): pages 956-965.
- Heath, David C., and William D. Sudderth. Continuous-time portfolio management: Minimizing the expected time to reach a goal. University of Minnesota, School of Statistics, 1984.
- Heath, David, and William Sudderth. "Coherent inference from improper priors and from finitely additive priors." The Annals of Statistics (1989): pages 907-919.
- Heath, David, Robert Jarrow, and Andrew Morton. "Bond pricing and the term structure of interest rates: A new methodology for contingent claims valuation." Econometrica 60, number 1 (1992): pages 77-105.
- Berry, Donald A., Robert W. Chen, Alan Zame, David C. Heath, and Larry A. Shepp. "Bandit problems with infinitely many arms." The Annals of Statistics (1997): pages 2103-2116.
- Heath, David, Sidney Resnick, and Gennady Samorodnitsky. "Heavy tails and long range dependence in on/off processes and associated fluid models." Mathematics of Operations Research 23, number 1 (1998): pages 145-165.
- Heath, David, Eckhard Platen, and Martin Schweizer. "A comparison of two quadratic approaches to hedging in incomplete markets." Mathematical Finance 11, number 4 (2001): pages 385-413.
- Artzner, Philippe, Freddy Delbaen, Jean-Marc Eber, and David Heath. "Coherent Measures of Risk1." Risk management: value at risk and beyond (2002): page 145.
- Heath, David, and Martin Schweizer. "Martingales versus PDEs in finance: an equivalence result with examples." Journal of Applied Probability (2000): pages 947-957.
- Artzner, Philippe, Freddy Delbaen, Jean-Marc Eber, David Heath, and Hyejin Ku. "Coherent multiperiod risk adjusted values and Bellman’s principle." Annals of Operations Research 152, number 1 (2007): pages 5-22.
