= Scott Atlas =

American physician and healthcare policy advisor (born 1955)

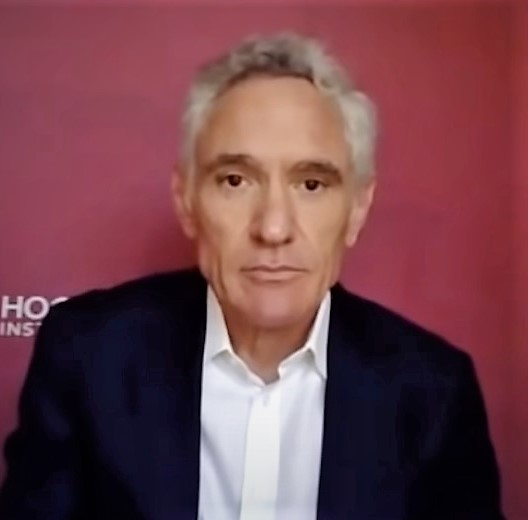
- Atlas in 2020
- Born: Scott William Atlas; July 5, 1955 (age 71); Chicago, Illinois, U.S.
- Education: University of Illinois, Urbana-Champaign (BS); University of Chicago (MD)
- Occupations: Radiologist; professor

Scott William Atlas (born July 5, 1955) is an American radiologist, political commentator, and health care policy advisor. He is the Robert Wesson Senior Fellow in health care policy at the Hoover Institution, a conservative think tank located at Stanford University. During the United States presidential campaigns of 2008, 2012, and 2016, Atlas was a Senior Advisor for Health Care to several presidential candidates. From 1998 to 2012 he was a professor and chief of neuroradiology at Stanford University Medical Center.

Atlas was selected by President Donald Trump in August 2020 to serve as an advisor on the White House Coronavirus Task Force. In that role, Atlas at times said misinformation about COVID-19, such as theories that face masks and social distancing were not effective in slowing the spread of the coronavirus. His statements and influence on policies caused controversy within the task force. Contrary to the recommendations of most of the scientific community, Atlas recommended establishing herd immunity by allowing or encouraging low-risk people to get COVID-19 while attempting to protect more vulnerable people.

He advocated that states should not engage in COVID-19 testing of virus-exposed but asymptomatic individuals, called for faster reopening of schools and businesses, and encouraged residents to resist or "rise up" against state restrictions adopted to prevent the spread of the coronavirus. Atlas resigned from his position in the White House on November 30, 2020.

== Early life ==
Atlas graduated from the University of Illinois at Urbana–Champaign with a Bachelor of Science degree in biology and earned his Doctor of Medicine (M.D.) from the University of Chicago, where he was a student at the Pritzker School of Medicine.

== Career ==
=== Medical ===
From 1998 to 2012, Atlas was Professor and Chief of Neuroradiology at Stanford University Medical Center in California. He trained more than 100 neuroradiology fellows in his teaching career. According to the American Board of Radiology, he is board certified in diagnostic radiology, while his certification in neuroradiology lapsed in 2017.

He is the editor of Magnetic Resonance Imaging of the Brain and Spine, a 2,000-page illustrated textbook with 83 contributors. He has also written four books on health care policy.

=== Political ===
Atlas is the Robert Wesson Senior Fellow at the Hoover Institution, a conservative public policy think tank. He joined the Hoover Institution in 2003.

He served as a senior advisor for health care to the Republican presidential campaigns of Rudy Giuliani in 2008 and Mitt Romney in 2012.

He has advocated eliminating the Affordable Care Act and replacing it with modified tax deductions and incentives. He has also called for changes to Medicare and "aggressive reforms" to turn Medicaid "into a bridge to private insurance" and encourage health savings accounts. Atlas views the Medicaid expansion as "one of the most misguided parts" of the Affordable Care Act. He opposes proposals to establish a public health insurance option or single-payer healthcare.

In December 2021, Atlas helped found the Academy for Science and Freedom with Martin Kulldorff and Jay Bhattacharya, a program of the private conservative liberal arts college Hillsdale College.

== Trump administration ==
=== Appointment as Trump coronavirus advisor ===
On August 10, 2020, President Donald Trump announced that Atlas would join his administration as an advisor on COVID-19. Atlas, a radiologist, is not a specialist in public health or infectious diseases. He reportedly caught Trump's eye because of his frequent appearances on Fox News that summer.

=== COVID-19 misinformation, controversial statements, and policy influence ===
Atlas advanced misinformation about COVID-19. He claimed that children "have virtually zero risk of dying, and a very, very low risk of any serious illness from this disease" and "children almost never transmit the disease" although children can carry, transmit, and in some cases be killed by the COVID-19 virus. As of September 2021, 544 American children had died of COVID-19, 0.095% of all COVID-19 deaths. He expressed skepticism that face masks help prevent the spread of the virus, including in a tweet in October 2020 that Twitter removed after determining it was not accurate. Later that day, HHS official Brett Giroir, the Assistant Secretary for Health, reaffirmed that masks did work to prevent transmission of the virus. Dr. Deborah Birx, the White House coronavirus response coordinator, was reported to be "relieved" by the removal of Atlas's tweet.

He argued that only symptomatic individuals should be tested for the coronavirus, and pushed for the August 24, 2020, change on the Centers for Disease Control and Prevention (CDC) website saying that people who had been exposed to the virus but showed no symptoms should not be tested. This position was opposed by many public health experts including CDC scientists, as 40% of people infected with the virus are asymptomatic but can still transmit the virus. On September 18 it was reported that the change to the testing recommendation had been written by the White House coronavirus task force, and had been placed on the CDC website by political appointees in the Department of Health and Human Services without the knowledge of CDC scientists. The original CDC recommendation — that anyone exposed to the virus should be tested whether or not they showed symptoms – was restored to the website the next day.

He advised that the virus should be allowed to spread naturally among people deemed at low risk, while protecting the most vulnerable populations, so as to gain herd immunity. The Washington Post reported that Atlas was the leading proponent within the Trump administration for a herd immunity approach to the virus, although some experts cautioned that such an approach could lead to hundreds of thousands more American deaths. Atlas later denied that he advocated for the herd immunity strategy, said "there's never been a desire to have cases spread through the community," and said it "has never been the president's policy." However, in October and November 2020, he "touted" the Great Barrington Declaration, an open letter that calls for encouraging herd immunity. He advocated for in-person school reopening and resumption of college sports during the pandemic.

He quickly became influential within the administration, and Trump welcomed his recommendations such as faster reopening and less testing, which were in accord with Trump's own preferences. Atlas was the only doctor to share the stage at Trump's pandemic briefings in the week after his appointment was announced, and he also prepared Trump's briefing materials. Trump publicly disagreed with or reduced the roles of other members of the White House Coronavirus Task Force, including Birx and Dr. Anthony Fauci, with whom Atlas repeatedly clashed. Robert R. Redfield of the CDC was heard privately commenting on Atlas that "everything he says is false". When Fauci was asked whether Atlas was providing misleading information to Trump, Fauci replied, without naming Atlas, that "sometimes there are things that are said that are really taken either out of context or actually incorrect". Starting in August 2020, Birx avoided meetings where Atlas was present. Fauci said of Atlas, "I have real problems with that guy. He's a smart guy who's talking about things that I believe he doesn't have any real insight or knowledge or experience in. He keeps talking about things that when you dissect it out and parse it out, it doesn't make any sense." In mid-November 2020, it was reported that Atlas had not attended White House task force meetings in person since late September amid his clashes with Fauci and Birx.

During stimulus negotiations in fall 2020, Atlas opposed funds for widespread COVID-19 testing; in an email to an economist, Atlas wrote that the push for testing was "a fundamental error of the public health people perpetrated on the world." After Trump was diagnosed with coronavirus in early October 2020, Atlas appeared on Fox News to predict a "complete and full and rapid recovery" for Trump and to urge viewers not to panic. On October 31, Atlas was interviewed for 26 minutes on a broadcast of the RT network (formerly Russia Today), a Russian state-controlled outlet classified by U.S. intelligence agencies as part of Russia's propaganda apparatus. The next day, Atlas apologized, writing: "I regret doing the interview and apologize for allowing myself to be taken advantage of." On November 15, Atlas wrote a tweet urging Michigan residents to "rise up" against the state's newly announced COVID-19 restrictions, which included a requirement that high school and college classes must be conducted remotely and a three-week ban on many indoor activities including restaurant dining. Atlas' tweet included the hashtags #FreedomMatters and #StepUp.

Deborah Birx, the former White House coronavirus coordinator, said Trump was fed "parallel data" that she hadn't approved. Somebody had been creating graphics for Trump to present "that were not transparently utilized." Atlas was involved, she said.

In November 2023, Atlas gave a presentation at the Benson Center for the Study of Western Civilization at University of Colorado Boulder titled "Restoring Trust After COVID".

=== Response from experts and others ===
Atlas's influence on policy alarmed many doctors and health experts. In September 2020, 78 of Atlas's former colleagues at the Stanford Medical School signed an open letter criticizing Atlas, writing that he had made "falsehoods and misrepresentations of science" that "run counter to established science" and "undermine public health authorities and the credible science that guides effective public health policy." Atlas's lawyer Marc Kasowitz threatened to sue the researchers.

Atlas's comment urging Michiganders to "rise up" against measures to prevent COVID-19 transmission was widely condemned by health professionals and by Stanford University, home of the Hoover Institute where Atlas is a senior fellow. In November 2020, Michigan Governor Gretchen Whitmer denounced the tweet as "incredibly reckless" and Fauci said: "I totally disagree with it, and I made no secret of that. ... I don't want to say anything against Dr. Atlas as a person but I totally disagree with the stand he takes. I just do, period."

The same month, the Stanford University Faculty Senate, by an 85% vote, adopted a resolution condemning Atlas for his actions that "promote a view of COVID-19 that contradicts medical science." The resolution cited Atlas's statements and said they endangered the public.

=== Resignation ===
On November 30, 2020, Atlas posted a letter (dated for the following day) resigning his White House position, days before the end of the maximum 130-day period in which he could serve with "special government employee" status.

== Selected works ==
- Magnetic Resonance Imaging of the Brain and Spine (1990 1st ed.; 1996; 2002; 2008; 2016)
- Power to the Patient: Selected Health Care Issues and Policy Solutions (2005)
- Reforming America’s Health Care System (2010)
- In Excellent Health: Setting the Record Straight on America’s Health Care System (2011)
- Restoring Quality Health Care: A Six‐Point Plan for Comprehensive Reform at Lower Cost (Hoover Press, 2020 2nd ed.)
