= Gunnar Kulldorff =

Swedish statistician (1927–2015)

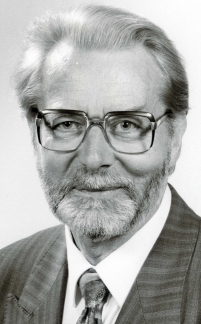
- Born: 6 December 1927; Malmö, Sweden
- Died: 25 June 2015 (aged 87); Umeå, Sweden
- Education: Lund University
- Spouse: Barbro Kulldorff
- Children: Martin Kulldorff
- Scientific career
- Fields: Statistics
- Workplaces: Lund University (1954–1965); Umeå University (1965–2015)
- Doctoral advisor: Carl-Erik Quensel

Gunnar Kulldorff (6 December 1927 – 25 June 2015) was a Swedish statistician, specializing in estimation theory, survey sampling and order statistics. From 1989 to 1991, he was the president of the International Statistical Institute.

== Biography ==
=== Early life ===
Gunnar Kulldorff was born in Malmö, Sweden on 6 December 1927, as the son of Erik and Ebba Kulldorff. In 1946, he entered Lund University, where he studied mathematics, statistics and mechanics, obtaining his bachelor's degree in 1949.

=== Scientific career ===
In 1954 Kulldorff earned a licentiate degree from the Department of Statistics at Lund University. Taking a teaching positions in the same department, he did his doctoral studies under the supervision of Carl-Erik Quensel and Harald Cramér. Kulldorff's research led to a PhD in 1961 for his thesis "Contributions to the Theory of Estimation from Grouped and Partially Grouped Samples". His thesis was republished by John Wiley & Sons as well as by the Soviet Union in a Russian translation. In a review for the Journal of the American Statistical Association, W. Edwards Deming wrote that "here is a book that faces reality, carrying the reader, in a modest 144 pages, on a wondrous excursion into the problems of grouped data, in which the reader cannot fail to catch the contagious enthusiasm of the author" .

In 1965, Kulldorff was appointed as the first professor of statistics at the newly established Umeå University, where he also became the first dean of the Faculty of Arts and Sciences. In 1966, he was appointed professor of mathematical statistics, a position he held until retirement. During this time, he wrote papers on survey sampling and the optimum combinations of selected order statistics from various well known parametric distributions, in order to draw inference on population parameters.

Kulldorff was president of the Swedish Statistical Society 1968-69 and 1985–87, and a member of the Statistics Sweden Scientific Advisory Board from 1988 to 2002. He was president of the Swedish professors union from 1978 to 1980.

=== International Statistical Work ===
A large portion of Kulldorff's work was devoted to the promotion of statistics at the international level. He was a guest researcher at Texas A&M University (1970), Purdue University (1971), Stanford University (1971), the University of Kentucky (1977), the University of Arizona (1983) and the University of Manitoba (1985). Elected to the International Statistical Institute in 1968, Kulldorff served as vice president of the organization from 1981 to 1985, president elect from 1987 to 1989 and president from 1989 to 1991. Around this time, he made many trips to support statistics in Africa, Asia and Latin America.

In 1991, just after their independence, Kulldorff visited the Baltic countries. Seeing a need for knowledge and education about survey statistics, which had been underdeveloped during the Soviet era, he initiated a scientific exchange program between the Baltic and Nordic countries. A few years later, this led to the creation of the Baltic-Nordic-Ukrainian Network on Survey Statistics, with annual conferences, workshops and/or summer schools. In 2006, he received an honorary doctorate from Vilnius University in Lithuania.

=== YMCA Activities ===
From an early age, Kulldorff was an active scout and scout leader in Malmö YMCA, leading to a long commitment to the organization. He was a board member (1954–66) and vice president (1962–66) of YMCA Sweden, where he played a key role in joining YMCA and YWCA into one organization, YWCA-YMCA of Sweden. From 1957 to 1966, he was a member of the YMCA International Board, and in the 1970s he was president of the local YMCA chapter in Umeå.
