= Journal of the Academy of Public Health =

Unconventional open-access medical journal

- Discipline: Public health
- Language: English
- Edited by: Martin Kulldorff, Andrew Noymer

Publication details
- History: 2025–present
- Publisher: RealClearJournals
- Frequency: Upon acceptance
- Open access: Yes
- License: CC BY 4.0

Standard abbreviations
- ISO 4: J. Acad. Public Health

Indexing
- OCLC no.: 10568436519

Links
- Journal homepage

The Journal of the Academy of Public Health is an unconventional online medical journal established in 2025.

== Origin ==
The journal was launched on February 5, 2025 with the intention of disrupting conventional academic publishing. Its founders are associated with anti-establishment medical views and its editorial board includes people associated with misinformation during the COVID-19 pandemic.

== Reaction ==
Writing for Science-Based Medicine, Jonathan Howard said the journal's founders were "misinformation superspreaders" and that it was likely to prove a vehicle for "propaganda masquerading as science to further the MAGA/MAHA political agenda".

== See also ==
- Great Barrington Declaration
