= Carl-Erik Quensel =

Swedish statistician and demographer

- Born: 9 October 1907; Malmö, Sweden
- Died: 10 April 1977 (aged 69)
- Education: Lund University
- Awards: 4
- Scientific career
- Fields: Statistics
- Workplaces: Lund University
- Doctoral students: Gunnar Kulldorff

Carl-Erik Quensel (9 October 1907 – 10 April 1977) was a Swedish statistician and demographer, specializing in population statistics, statistical distribution theory and biostatistics.

== Biography ==
=== Early life ===
Carl-Erik Quensel was born in Malmö, Sweden, on 9 October 1907, the son of Conrad and Ester Quensel.

=== Scientific career ===
In 1935 Qunsel earned a licentiate degree from the Department of Statistics at Lund University, followed by a PhD degree in 1938. In 1941, he was appointed professor of Statistics at Lund University. Quensel was an elected member of the International Statistical Institute. He served as a Swedish delegate to the United Nations Population committee.

=== Major scientific work ===
A Method of Determining the Regression Curve When the Marginal Distribution is of the Normal Logarithmic Type, Annals of Mathematical Statistics, 7:196-201, 1936.

Second moment and of the Correlation Coefficient in Samples from Populations of Type A, The Statistical Institute at the University of Lund. Lund, C. W. K. Gleerup/Leipzig, Otto Harrassowitz, 1938.

Lärobok i den teoretiska statistikens grunder, Lund 1944.

Befolkningsframskrivningar för Hälsingborgs stad 1945 – 1975, Lund, 1949.

Studenternas utbildningsval, tillsammans med Bo Israelsson, Lund, 1958.
