= Redhawk Publications =

University press

- Parent company: Catawba Valley Community College
- Country of origin: United States
- Headquarters location: Hickory, North Carolina
- Publication types: Books
- Official website: redhawkpublications.com

Redhawk Publications is an American publishing house affiliated with Catawba Valley Community College (CVCC) in Hickory, North Carolina. It publishes artistic fiction, notable non-fiction, and regional instructional materials by CVCC staff, students, and other authors.

Redhawk Publications' first book was the 2016 release Polio, Pitchforks, and Perseverance: How a North Carolina County Named Catawba Built a "Miracle" (which later inspired a documentary film named Miracle). Since then, the press has released over 200 major works, including poetry compilations, history, non-fiction, children's books, memoirs, fiction, and instructional materials.

Redhawk Publications also co-sponsors the North Carolina Poetry Society's Lena Shull Book Award.

== See also ==
- List of English-language book publishing companies
- List of university presses
