= Sunetra Gupta =

British novelist and epidemiologist

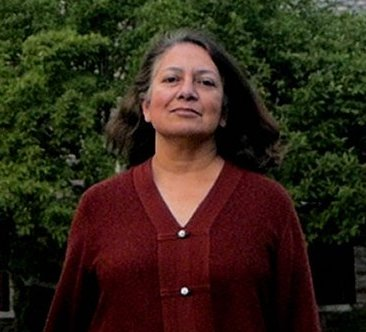
- Gupta in 2020
- Born: 15 March 1965 (age 61); Calcutta, West Bengal, India
- Citizenship: British
- Education: Princeton University (BA); Imperial College London (PhD)
- Spouse: Adrian V. S. Hill (m. 1994; div. 2020)
- Children: 2
- Awards: Scientific Medal of ZSL; Rosalind Franklin Award; Sahitya Akademi Award
- Scientific career
- Fields: Epidemiology, evolutionary biology
- Workplaces: University of Oxford
- Thesis: Heterogeneity and the Transmission Dynamics of Infectious Diseases (1992)
- Gupta's voice from the BBC programme The Life Scientific, 25 September 2012.

Sunetra Gupta (born 15 March 1965) is an Indian-born British infectious disease epidemiologist and a professor of theoretical epidemiology at the Department of Zoology, University of Oxford. She has performed research on the transmission dynamics of various infectious diseases, including malaria, influenza and COVID-19, and has received the Scientific Medal of the Zoological Society of London and the Rosalind Franklin Award of the Royal Society. She is a member of the scientific advisory board of Collateral Global, an organisation which examines the global impact of COVID-19 restrictions.

Gupta is also a novelist and a recipient of the Sahitya Akademi Award.

== Early life and education ==
Gupta was born in Kolkata, India, to Dhruba and Minati Gupta. She trained in biology, and was awarded a bachelor's degree from Princeton University. In 1992 she obtained her PhD from Imperial College London for a thesis on the transmission dynamics of infectious diseases.

== Career and research ==
=== Positions ===
Gupta is a professor of theoretical epidemiology in the Department of Zoology at the University of Oxford, where she leads a team of infectious disease epidemiologists. She has undertaken research on various infectious diseases, including malaria, HIV, influenza, bacterial meningitis and COVID-19. She is a supernumerary fellow of Merton College, Oxford. She also sits on the European Advisory Board of Princeton University Press.

In April 2021, she received a £90,000 donation from the Georg and Emily von Opel Foundation. In May 2022 she joined a partnership with Blue Water Vaccines, Inc. to apply her research to the development of a universal flu vaccine.

=== Awards ===
Gupta has been awarded the 2007 Scientific Medal by the Zoological Society of London and the 2009 Royal Society Rosalind Franklin Award. In July 2013, Gupta's portrait was on display during the prestigious Royal Society's Summer Science Exhibition along with leading female scientist such as Madame Curie. She was elected a Fellow of the Royal Society of Literature in 2024.

=== COVID-19 ===
In March 2020, some modelling of the COVID-19 pandemic by Gupta and colleagues was released to the media. Their model suggested that up to 68% of the UK population could already have been infected, suggesting broader immunity and a subsiding threat. The findings differed greatly from the work of other experts and quickly came under criticism. In May that year, she told UnHerd that she believed "the epidemic has largely come and is on its way out in [the UK]. So, I think [the infection fatality rate] would be definitely less than one in a thousand, and probably closer to one in ten thousand." A one in ten thousand infection fatality rate (IFR) was impossible for the spring of 2020 given the number of COVID deaths and the size of the UK population. Contemporaneous estimates of other experts for the IFR fell in a range much higher than this.

Gupta has been a critic of lockdowns in the pandemic. She was one of the three authors of the Great Barrington Declaration in 2020, which advocated lifting COVID-19 restrictions on lower-risk groups to develop herd immunity through infection, while stating that vulnerable people should be protected from the virus. The World Health Organization, as well as numerous other academic and public-health bodies, stated that the strategy proposed by the declaration is dangerous, unethical, and lacks a sound scientific basis. The American Public Health Association and 13 other public-health groups in the United States said in a joint open letter that the Great Barrington Declaration "is not a strategy, it is a political statement" and said it was "selling false hope that will predictably backfire".

In 2021, she was an author at the Brownstone Institute, a new think tank founded by Jeffrey Tucker where senior roles were held by Martin Kulldorff and Jay Bhattacharya, her co-authors on the Great Barrington Declaration.

== Works of fiction ==
Gupta wrote her first works of fiction in Bengali. She was a translator of the poetry of Rabindranath Tagore. She has published several novels in English. In October 2012 her fifth novel, So Good in Black, was longlisted for the DSC Prize for South Asian Literature. Her novels have been awarded the Sahitya Akademi Award, the Southern Arts Literature Prize, shortlisted for the Crossword Award, and longlisted for the Orange Prize.

== Personal life ==
Gupta was married to the Irish vaccinologist Adrian V. S. Hill from 1994 to 2020. They have two daughters. She has dismissed claims of having a right-wing perspective, claiming to be "more Left than Labour".

== Selected works ==
=== Journal articles ===
- Gupta, S.; Snow, R. W.; Donnelly, C. A.; Marsh, K.; Newbold, C. (1999). "Immunity to non-cerebral severe malaria is acquired after one or two infections". Nature Medicine. 5 (3): 340–343. doi:10.1038/6560. PMID 10086393. S2CID 21758199.
- Ferguson, N.; Anderson, R.; Gupta, S. (1999). "The effect of antibody-dependent enhancement on the transmission dynamics and persistence of multiple-strain pathogens". Proceedings of the National Academy of Sciences. 96 (2): 790–794. Bibcode:1999PNAS...96..790F. doi:10.1073/pnas.96.2.790. PMC 15215. PMID 9892712.
- Recker, M.; Nee, S.; Bull, P. C.; Kinyanjui, S.; Marsh, K.; Newbold, C.; Gupta, S. (2004). "Transient cross-reactive immune responses can orchestrate antigenic variation in malaria". Nature. 429 (6991): 555–558. Bibcode:2004Natur.429..555R. doi:10.1038/nature02486. PMID 15175751. S2CID 4403438.
- Gupta, Sunetra (9 August 2001). "Avoiding ambiguity" (PDF). Nature. 412 (6847): 589. Bibcode:2001Natur.412..589G. doi:10.1038/35088152. PMID 11493898. S2CID 1528499.
- Recker, M.; Pybus, O. G.; Nee, S.; Gupta, S. (2007). "The generation of influenza outbreaks by a network of host immune responses against a limited set of antigenic types". Proceedings of the National Academy of Sciences. 104 (18): 7711–7716. Bibcode:2007PNAS..104.7711R. doi:10.1073/pnas.0702154104. PMC 1855915. PMID 17460037.
- Buckee, C. O.; Jolley, K. A.; Recker, M.; Penman, B.; Kriz, P.; Gupta, S.; Maiden, M. C. J. (2008). "Role of selection in the emergence of lineages and the evolution of virulence in Neisseria meningitidis". Proceedings of the National Academy of Sciences. 105 (39): 15082–7. Bibcode:2008PNAS..10515082B. doi:10.1073/pnas.0712019105. PMC 2553036. PMID 18815379.
- Lourenco, José; Pinotti, Francesco; Thompson, Craig; Gupta, Sunetra (2020). "The impact of host resistance on cumulative mortality and the threshold of herd immunity for SARS-CoV-2". medRxiv 10.1101/2020.07.15.20154294.

=== Novels ===
- Memories of Rain (1992)
- The Glassblower's Breath (1993)
- Moonlight into Marzipan (1995)
- A Sin of Colour (1999)
- So Good in Black (2009)
