= Jay Bhattacharya =

American physician-scientist and health economist (born 1968)

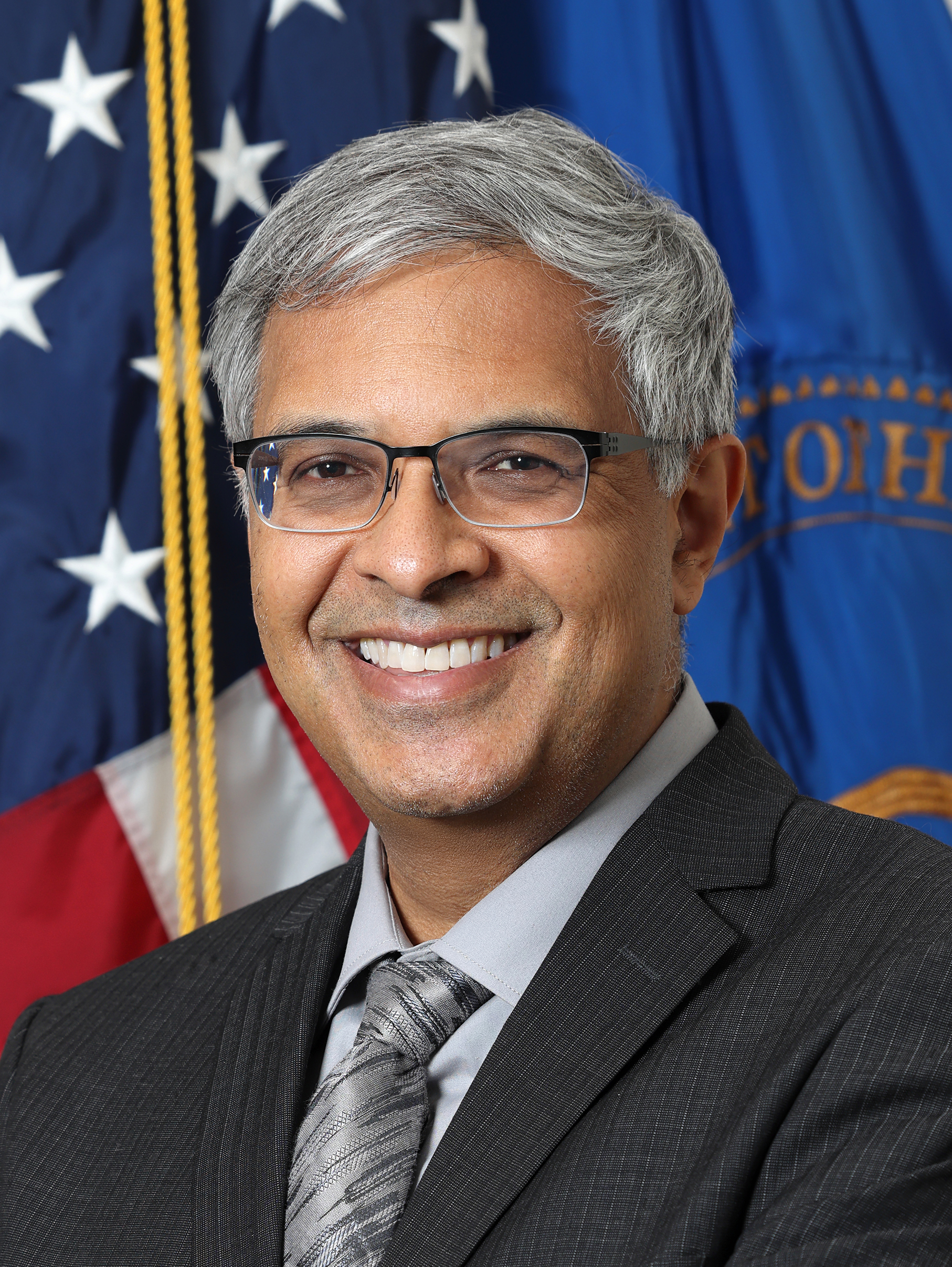
- Official portrait, 2025

18th Director of the National Institutes of Health
- Incumbent
- Assumed office April 1, 2025
- President: Donald Trump
- Deputy: Matthew Memoli
- Preceded by: Monica Bertagnolli

Acting Director of the Centers for Disease Control and Prevention
- In office February 18, 2026 – August 12, 2026
- President: Donald Trump
- Preceded by: Jim O'Neill
- Succeeded by: Erica Schwartz

Personal details
- Born: Jayanta Bhattacharya; 1968 (age 57–58) Kolkata, India
- Education: Stanford University (BA, MA, MD, PhD)
- Known for: Great Barrington Declaration
- Scientific career
- Fields: Biomedicine, econometrics, health economics
- Workplaces: Stanford University
- Thesis: Lifetime returns to specialization in medicine (2000)
- Doctoral advisor: Thomas MaCurdy

Jayanta Bhattacharya (born 1968) is an American health economist, trained as a physician, who has served as the 18th director of the National Institutes of Health since 2025. Bhattacharya additionally served as the acting director of the Centers for Disease Control and Prevention in 2026.

Bhattacharya earned his M.D. and Ph.D. in economics from Stanford University. He does not practice medicine but specializes in health economics. Bhattacharya was a professor of medicine, economics, and health research policy at Stanford University until March 2025, when he left his position and became an emeritus professor so that he could start his position at the National Institutes of Health (NIH). He also was an investigator at Stanford's Center for Demography and Economics of Health and Aging whose research focused on the economics of health care. In November 2024, President Donald Trump named Bhattacharya as his choice to lead the NIH, and he was confirmed by the United States Senate on March 25, 2025.

Bhattacharya is the first Indian American to lead the NIH. He opposed the lockdowns and mask mandates imposed in 2020 as a response to the COVID-19 pandemic. With Martin Kulldorff and Sunetra Gupta, he was a co-author in 2020 of the Great Barrington Declaration, which advocated lifting COVID-19 restrictions on lower-risk groups to develop herd immunity through widespread infection, while promoting the fringe notion that vulnerable people could be simultaneously protected from the virus.

== Early life and education ==
Bhattacharya was born in 1968 in Kolkata, India, to a Bengali Hindu family. He later became a naturalized American citizen.

Bhattacharya graduated with honors from Stanford University with both a Bachelor of Arts and a Master of Arts degree in economics in 1990, earning membership in Phi Beta Kappa. While in college, he converted to Christianity. He then simultaneously pursued a medical degree and a doctorate in economics at Stanford, earning his Doctor of Medicine (M.D.) from the Stanford University School of Medicine in 1997 and his Ph.D. from Stanford in economics, econometrics, and health economics in 2000. His doctoral dissertation, Lifetime returns to specialization in medicine, was supervised by professor Thomas MaCurdy.

== Career ==
Bhattacharya began his career at the RAND Corporation as an economist (1998–2001), while simultaneously serving as a visiting assistant professor in the Department of Economics at UCLA. He later held a research fellowship at the Hoover Institution from 2006 to 2008.

At Stanford University, Bhattacharya held multiple academic appointments. He served as a professor of medicine, with courtesy professorships in both economics and health research and policy. He was also a senior fellow at the Stanford Institute for Economic Policy Research and directed Stanford's Center for Demography and Economics of Health and Aging. Additionally, he maintains positions as a senior fellow by courtesy at the Freeman Spogli Institute for International Studies, and as a research associate at both Acumen LLC and the National Bureau of Economic Research.

His research has focused on population health and well-being, with particular attention to the impact of government programs, biomedical innovation, and economic factors.

== COVID-19 pandemic ==
Bhattacharya was an early opponent of lockdowns in response to the COVID-19 pandemic and questioned the severity of severe acute respiratory syndrome coronavirus 2 (SARS-CoV-2), the virus that causes COVID-19.

On March 24, 2020, Bhattacharya co-wrote an opinion piece in The Wall Street Journal entitled "Is the Coronavirus as Deadly as They Say?" that argued there was little evidence to support shelter-in-place orders and quarantines of the COVID-19 pandemic in the United States. Bhattacharya was a lead author of a serology study released in April 2020 that suggested that as many as 80,000 residents of Santa Clara County, California, might have already been infected with SARS-CoV-2. The study's design, conduct, statistical analysis, and conclusions were widely criticized as flawed. JetBlue's former owner David Neeleman contributed $5,000 to Stanford University for the research, according to a whistleblower report; however, the researchers said they had no knowledge of this funding.

He is a co-author of the Great Barrington Declaration, an open letter claiming that COVID-19 lockdowns could be avoided via the fringe notion of "focused protection". In it, Bhattacharya and the two other authors thought the virus should be allowed to spread among healthy people, with the aim of achieving herd immunity. Bhattacharya wrote the declaration with Martin Kulldorff, at the time a professor of medicine at Harvard Medical School, and Sunetra Gupta, professor of theoretical epidemiology at Oxford University. It was published on 5 October 2020.

In October 2020, the World Health Organization's Director General said that pursuing herd immunity before vaccination would be "scientifically and ethically problematic" and "allowing a dangerous virus that we don't fully understand to run free is simply unethical." In an interview, Bhattacharya said he hoped the declaration would prompt a dialogue about the benefits and harms of public health interventions. In October 2020, Bhattacharya, Kulldorff and Gupta met with U.S. President Donald Trump's health officials about the declaration.

At the beginning of 2021, Bhattacharya wrote an op-ed in favor of reserving initially limited vaccine supplies in India for patients who had not been previously infected with COVID-19. In March 2021, Bhattacharya called the COVID-19 lockdowns the "biggest public health mistake we've ever made" and argued that "The harm to people is catastrophic". In May 2021, Bhattacharya was called as an expert witness for ten applicants who filed a constitutional challenge against Manitoba's COVID-19 public health orders. The judge determined that the public health restrictions did not violate charter rights, noting that most scientific and medical experts did not support Bhattacharya's views. In April, Bhattacharya participated in Florida Governor Ron DeSantis' roundtable about "Big Tech censorship and the COVID-19 pandemic". In August, Bhattacharya provided testimony in defense of Florida's ban on mask mandates. The judge ruled against the Florida ban and said that the state's medical experts "are in a distinct minority among doctors and scientists". Bhattacharya publicly opposed COVID-19 vaccine passports and mandates, although he called the vaccines successful. In December, with Kulldorff and Scott Atlas, Bhattacharya helped found a program called Academy for Science and Freedom at Hillsdale College, a conservative Christian liberal arts school. Peter Thiel and Elon Musk have expressed support for Bhattacharya.

In a 2021 case about masks in Tennessee schools, judge Waverly D. Crenshaw Jr. of the United States District Court for the Middle District of Tennessee criticized Bhattacharya's testimony as "troubling and problematic", said Bhattacharya had oversimplified conclusions of a study, and said he "offered opinions regarding the pediatric effects of masks on children, a discipline on which he admitted he was not qualified to speak." He was also named a senior scholar at the Brownstone Institute, a new think tank launched by Jeffrey Tucker that published articles opposing various measures against COVID-19; Kulldorff and Gupta, his co-authors on the Great Barrington Declaration, have also had roles there.

In April 2022, Bhattacharya wrote that he experienced racist attacks and death threats during the pandemic. He alleged that "Big tech outlets like Facebook and Google" suppressed "our ideas, falsely deeming them 'misinformation'". He wrote that "I started getting calls from reporters asking me why I wanted to 'let the virus rip,' when I had proposed nothing of the sort." Also in April, in response to California proposing a bill that would discipline physicians for promoting or spreading false information about COVID-19, Bhattacharya said that the bill could turn "doctors into agents of state public health rather than advocates for their patients". In December 2022, Florida governor Ron DeSantis named Bhattacharya, Kulldorff and several others to his newly formed Public Health Integrity Committee to "offer critical assessments" of recommendations from federal health agencies. Later in 2022, when COVID boosters for the Omicron variant were available, Bhattacharya made multiple misleading statements about them, including incorrectly describing how they were tested.

According to a December 2022 release of the Twitter Files, Bhattacharya was placed on a Twitter "Trends blacklist" in August 2021 that prevented his tweets from showing up in trending topics searches. It coincided with his first tweet on the service, which advocated for the Great Barrington Declaration's herd immunity proposal.

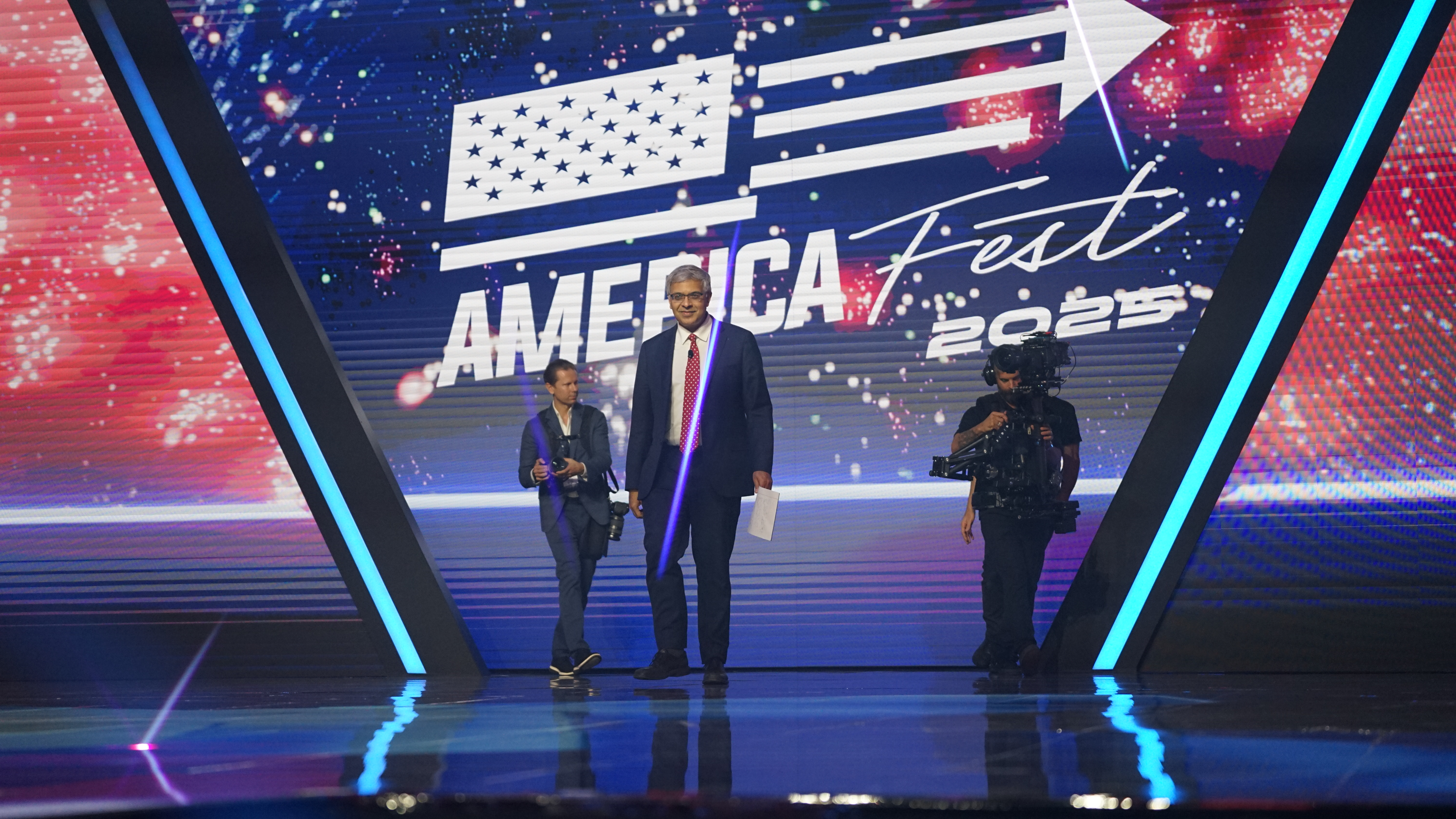
Bhattacharya at AmericaFest 2025

In June 2024, Bhattacharya was listed as a plaintiff on the U.S. Supreme Court case Murthy v. Missouri but ultimately lost the case due to lack of legal standing. Justice Barrett delivered the opinion of the majority, stating "plaintiffs failed to show a concrete link between the restrictions that they alleged and conduct of government officials".

== NIH director ==
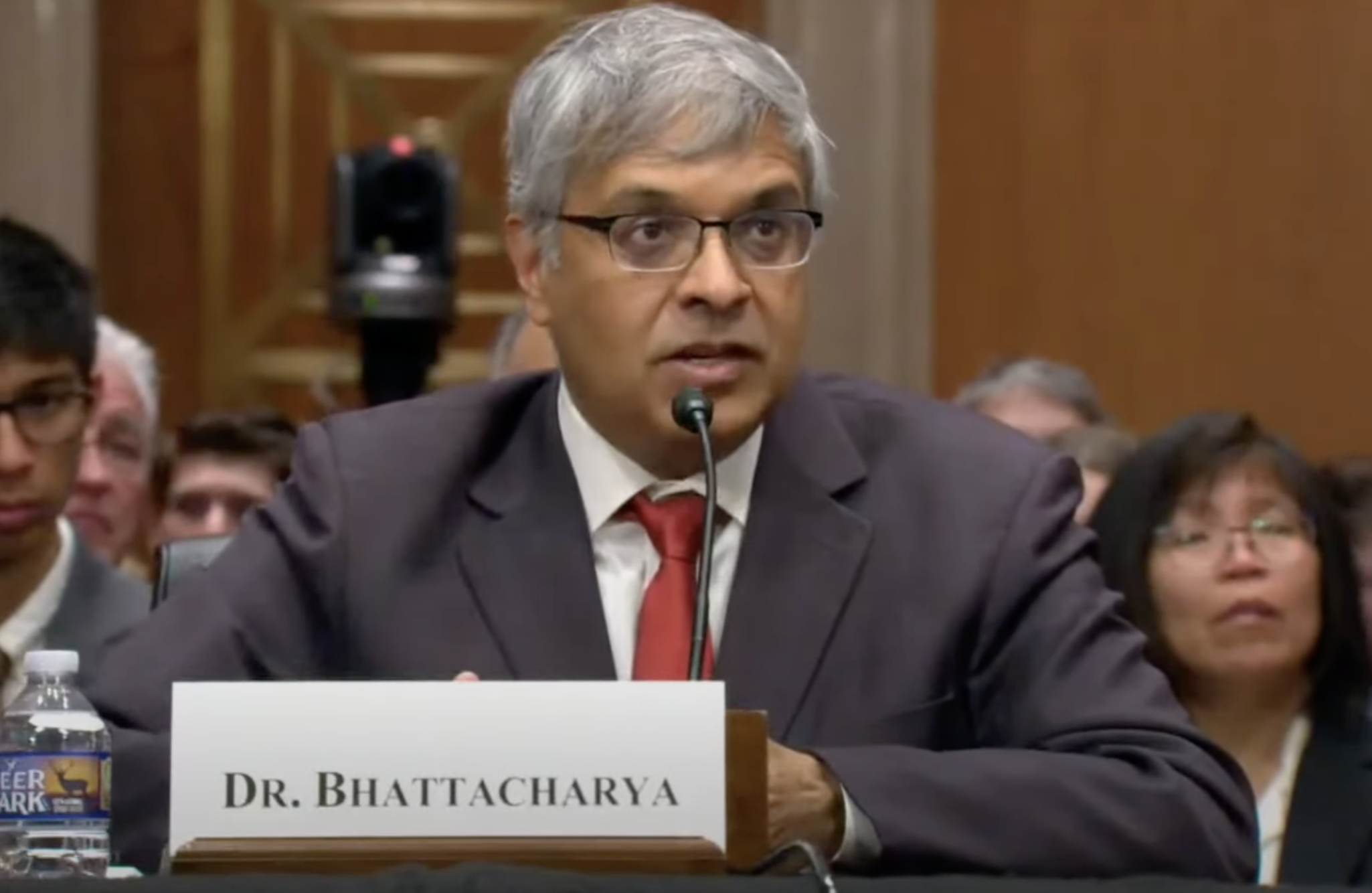
Bhattacharya at his confirmation hearing

On November 26, 2024, Trump named Bhattacharya as the director of the National Institutes of Health. His goals included withholding research grants from institutions that are not aligned with conservative views. His nomination was confirmed by the U.S. Senate on March 25, 2025 on a party- line vote, 53 to 47.

Among the first major actions taken as NIH director was eliminating subcontracting with foreign researchers on May 1, 2025. Rather than subcontracting, the new policy required foreign researchers to have a direct contract with the NIH. In a change of NIH policy, no existing NIH awards to domestic institutions would be continued past the current year of funding if any foreign funding was included as a foreign subcontract. This annual extension of current awards is termed a "non-competing continuation". No new awards would be given this fiscal year that included foreign funding via a subcontract.

Bhattacharya subsequently introduced and championed the Trump administration HHS gender dysphoria report written by the Department of Health and Human Services in compliance with Executive Order 14187, which made it illegal for the federal government to advocate in favor of gender-affirming care under the age of 19. The report contradicted the consensus of the mainstream medical community, instead advocating for conversion therapy as the primary means of treatment for transgender youth.

On February 18, 2026, Bhattacharya was concurrently appointed Acting Director of the Centers for Disease Control and Prevention.

== Selected publications ==
- Bendavid, Eran; Oh, Christopher; Bhattacharya, Jay; Ioannidis, John P.A. (April 2021). "Assessing Mandatory Stay-at-Home and Business Closure Effects on the Spread of COVID-19". European Journal of Clinical Investigation. 51 (4) e13484. doi:10.1111/eci.13484. ISSN 0014-2972. PMC 7883103. PMID 33400268.
- Alsan, Marcella; Atella, Vincenzo; Bhattacharya, Jay; et al. (February 2019). "Technological Progress and Health Convergence: The Case of Penicillin in Post-War Italy". Working Paper. Working Paper Series (25541). National Bureau of Economic Research. doi:10.3386/w25541. S2CID 4903383.
- Goldhaber-Fiebert, Jeremy D.; Studdert, David M.; Farid, Monica S.; Bhattacharya, Jay (2015). "Will Divestment From Employment-Based Health Insurance Save Employers Money? The Case of State and Local Governments". Journal of Empirical Legal Studies. 12 (3): 343–394. doi:10.1111/jels.12076. S2CID 154837009.
- Bhattacharya, Jay; Gathmann, Christina; Miller, Grant (2013). "The Gorbachev Anti-Alcohol Campaign and Russia's Mortality Crisis". American Economic Journal: Applied Economics. 5 (2): 232–260. doi:10.1257/app.5.2.232. PMC 3818525. PMID 24224067.
- Yoo, Byung-Kwang; Kasajima, Megumi; Bhattacharya, Jay (February 2010). "Public Avoidance and the Epidemiology of novel H1N1 Influenza A". Working Paper. Working Paper Series (15752). National Bureau of Economic Research. doi:10.3386/w15752. S2CID 128860977.
- Bhattacharya, Jay; Bundorf, Kate; Pace, Noemi; Sood, Neeraj (April 2009). "Does Health Insurance Make You Fat?" (PDF). Working Paper. Working Paper Series (15163). National Bureau of Economic Research. doi:10.3386/w15163. hdl:10278/31283.
- Bhattacharya, Jay; Choudhry, Kavita; Lakdawalla, Darius (January 2008). "Chronic disease and severe disability among working-age populations". Medical Care. 46 (1): 92–100. doi:10.1097/MLR.0b013e3181484335. PMID 18162861. S2CID 45230256.
- Bhattacharya, Jay; Bundorf, M. Kate (May 2009). "The Incidence of the Healthcare Costs of Obesity". Journal of Health Economics. 28 (3): 649–658. doi:10.1016/j.jhealeco.2009.02.009. PMC 4224588. PMID 19433210.
