= Jeffrey Tucker =

American libertarian writer and advocate (born 1963)

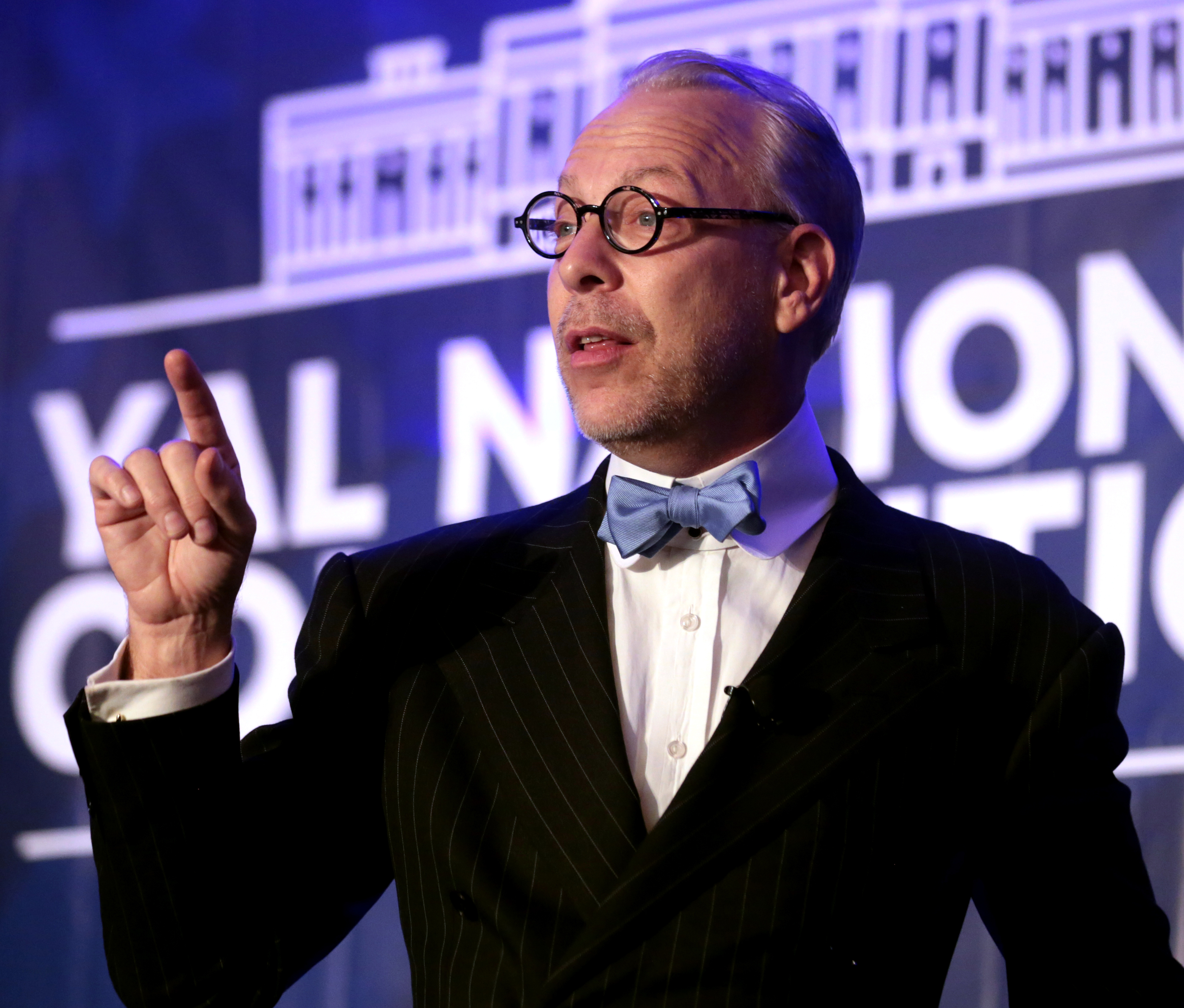
- Tucker in 2017
- Born: Jeffrey Albert Tucker; December 19, 1963 (age 62); Fresno, California
- Occupations: Author, CEO, publisher
- Website: jeffreytucker.me

Jeffrey Albert Tucker (born December 19, 1963) is an American libertarian writer, publisher, entrepreneur and advocate of anarcho-capitalism and Bitcoin.

He worked for Ron Paul, the Mises Institute, and LewRockwell.com for many years. Beginning in 2020, he organized efforts against COVID-19 pandemic restrictions with the American Institute for Economic Research (AIER), and in 2021 he founded the Brownstone Institute think tank to continue such efforts.

As of 2021, he is Chief Liberty Officer (CLO) of Liberty.me. He is an adjunct scholar with the Mackinac Center for Public Policy, a research affiliate of the Blockchain Innovation Hub of the Royal Melbourne Institute of Technogy, and an Acton Institute associate.

== Early life and education ==
Jeffrey Albert Tucker was born in Fresno, California, in 1963, the son of Texas historian Albert Briggs Tucker and Roberta Janeice (Robertson) Tucker.

He studied economics as an undergraduate at Texas Tech University and Howard Payne University, where he first encountered the literature of the Austrian School.

== Career ==
=== Writer and editor ===
While studying at George Mason, Tucker attended a journalism program in Washington, D.C., where he became a volunteer at the Washington office of the Mises Institute.

In the late 1980s, he worked for Ron Paul as an assistant to editor Lew Rockwell. During Paul's 2008 Presidential campaign, the newsletters written on behalf of Paul became controversial because some contained statements against black people and gay people. Tucker was said to have helped Rockwell write the newsletters.

From 1997 to 2011, Tucker worked for the Mises Institute, of which Rockwell was a co-founder, as editorial vice president and editor for the institute's website, Mises.org. From 1999 to 2011 he contributed to LewRockwell.com.

According to a 2000 report by the Southern Poverty Law Center (SPLC), Tucker wrote for publications of the League of the South, a group the SPLC considers neo-Confederate and white supremacist. The SPLC report stated that Tucker was listed as a founding member on the league's website, but that Tucker denied being a member.

In late 2011, Tucker was hired by Addison Wiggin as publisher and executive editor of Laissez Faire Books, and worked in that capacity until 2016. As of 2017, he remained a contributor to LFB.

Tucker was appointed a Distinguished Fellow of the Foundation for Economic Education in 2013, speaking at FEE's seminars and writing for its publication.The Freeman From 2015 to 2017, he was FEE's Director of Content.

Tucker became editorial director of the American Institute for Economic Research (AIER) in late 2017. As of 2021, he is listed as an independent editorial consultant at AIER.

=== Bitcoin advocacy ===
In 2013, Tucker wrote "Bitcoin for Beginners," a primer about the cryptocurrency bitcoin, in which he described it as solving the problems of double spending and single point of failure. He has been interviewed on the subject by Reason at the 2013 Freedom Fest and Fox Business Channel. Tucker's 2015 book Bit by Bit is devoted to bitcoin and other products of the "information economy". In 2018 he became a research affiliate of the Blockchain Innovation Hub, a study center at RMIT University.

In 2018, Tucker endorsed Liberland, a micronation claimed on a disputed sandbank between Croatia and Serbia that accepts the cryptocurrencies bitcoin, Bitcoin Cash, and Ethereum.

=== Speaker ===
Tucker has appeared as a speaker at conferences on Austrian school economics and libertarianism including FreedomFest conferences, events of the Free State Project, and the 2016 and 2018 Libertarian Party national convention.

=== Social media ===
In 2013, Tucker founded Liberty.me, a "social network and online publishing platform for the liberty minded", and became its CEO (under the title "Chief Liberty Officer"). It launched a successful Indiegogo fundraising campaign in 2013 and began operation in 2014.

=== COVID-19 pandemic and Brownstone Institute ===
Tucker blogged in opposition to social distancing measures and face masks during the COVID-19 pandemic, framing them as subservience to "arbitrary and ignorant authority".

In 2020, Tucker helped organize the Great Barrington Declaration, signed at AIER, which advocated the lifting of COVID-19 restrictions.

In 2021, Tucker founded the nonprofit Brownstone Institute for Social and Economic Research, a think tank that opposes various measures against COVID-19, including masking and vaccine mandates. Senior roles were given to Martin Kulldorff and Jay Bhattacharya, two of the co-authors of the Great Barrington Declaration, which Tucker also helped to organize. The institute has described itself as "the spiritual child" of the Great Barrington Declaration. Writers of Brownstone articles have included Sunetra Gupta, the third co-author of the Great Barrington Declaration, Paul E. Alexander, a former Trump administration health official, and George Gilder, a senior resident fellow at AIER. Science-Based Medicine has described the Brownstone Institute as spreading misinformation against vaccines and in favor of disproven treatments.

== Views ==
Tucker has referred to war as an "alluring illusion" and has been critical of American interventionist foreign policy.

In an interview for California Sunday, Tucker described his "vision of freedom" by recalling a view over São Paulo by night: "As far as my eyes could see, there were lights and buildings and civilization burgeoning — an awesome amount of human knowledge, energy, innovation, creative capacity right in front of me. I began to turn, and it was true over here, and over there, and in every single direction, and I thought, 'That’s it! This world will never be governed. It cannot be governed.' It was beautiful."

== Personal life ==
Formerly a Southern Baptist, Tucker is a convert to traditionalist Catholicism. He was managing editor of the Church Music Association of America journal Sacred Music from 2006 to 2014.

== Published works ==
=== Books ===
- Henry Hazlitt: Giant For Liberty (with Llewellyn H. Rockwell and Murray N. Rothbard, 1994, Ludwig von Mises Institute, ISBN 978-0-945466-16-1): an annotated bibliography of the works of Henry Hazlitt. A Foundation for Economic Education review described the book, which "includes citations of a novel, works on literary criticism, treatises on economics and moral philosophy, several edited volumes, some 16 other books and many chapters in books, plus articles, commentaries, and reviews," as "an apt eulogy of Henry Hazlitt."
- Sing Like a Catholic (2009, Church Music Association of America, ISBN 978-1-60743-722-2): essays on church music
- Bourbon for Breakfast: Living Outside the Statist Quo (2010, Ludwig von Mises Institute, ISBN 978-1-933550-89-3)
- It's a Jetsons World: Private Miracles and Public Crimes (2011, Ludwig von Mises Institute, ISBN 978-1-61016-194-7)
- Hack Your Shower Head: and 10 Other Ways to Get Big Government out of Your Home (2012, Laissez Faire Books, ISBN 978-1-62129-063-6)
- A Beautiful Anarchy: How to Create Your Own Civilization in the Digital Age (2012, Laissez Faire Books, ISBN 978-1-62129-041-4): on the effects of small business regulation
- Liberty.me: Freedom Is a Do-It-Yourself Project (2014, Liberty.me, ISBN 978-1-63069-032-8)
- Bit by Bit: How P2P is Freeing the World (2015, e-book)
- Advice for Young, Unemployed Workers (2015, pamphlet, Foundation for Economic Education, ISBN 978-1-57246-039-3)
- Right-Wing Collectivism: The Other Threat to Liberty (2017): Addresses the threat of collectivism from the right as well as the far left
- Liberty or Lockdown (2020): Discusses the choice between liberty and COVID-19 lockdowns

=== In periodicals ===
He has written for, among others, Journal of Libertarian Studies, The Wall Street Journal, The Journal of Commerce, National Review, The Freeman, Catholic World Report, Crisis, Sacred Music, Newsweek, and Chronicles.
