= YWCA-YMCA of Sweden =

Swedish organization

- KFUK-KFUM Sverige
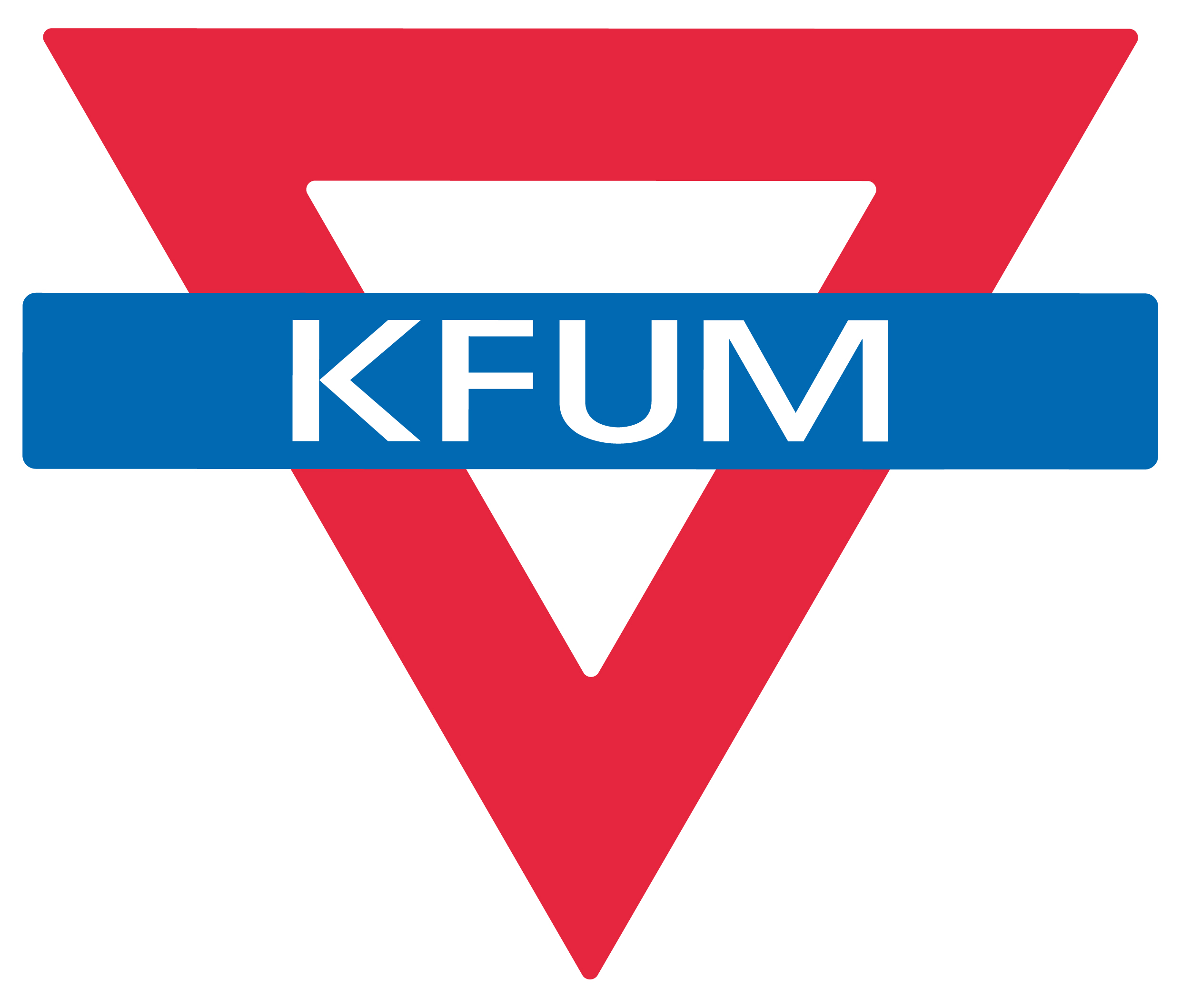
- Formation: 1966
- Type: Christian youth organization
- Headquarters: Skeppsbron 28, Stockholm, Sweden
- Methods: Ecumenism; sport; music
- Members: 60,000
- Official language: Swedish
- Chairperson: Emma Hundertmark
- General Secretary: Alexander Clemenson
- Website: kfum.se

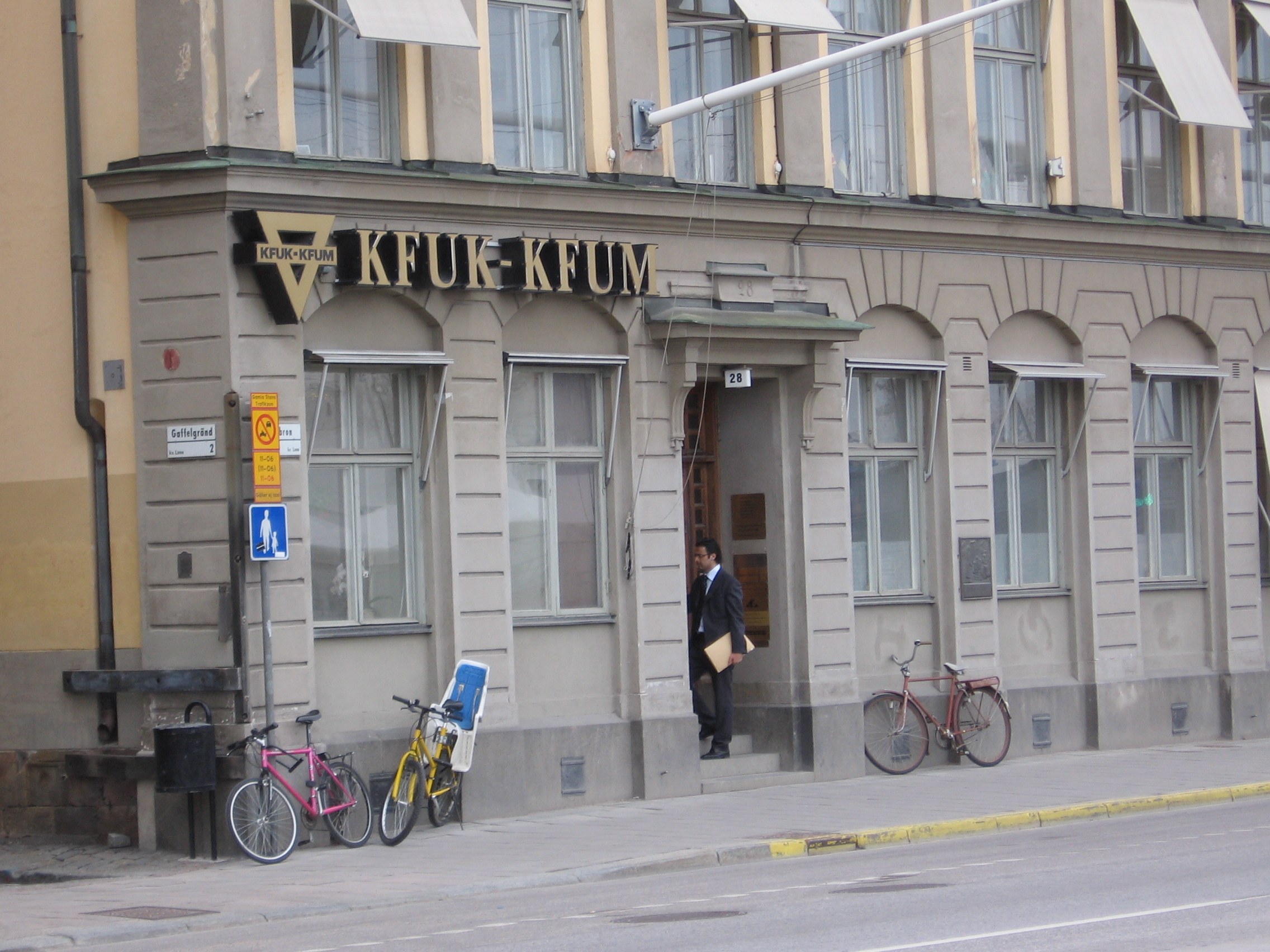
Headquarters in Stockholm.

The YWCA-YMCA of Sweden (Swedish: KFUK-KFUM Sverige) is the Swedish branch of the YMCA and the YWCA. It was established in 1966 following a merger of the formerly separate YMCA of Sweden and the YWCA of Sweden, which were originally founded in 1884 and 1885 respectively.

In 2011, the organization decided to use the term KFUM Sverige during promotion where M now stands for människor ("people") instead of män (men) as before.

The YWCA-YMCA of Sweden has 40,000 members in 140 local associations. Several Swedish YWCA-YMCA associations have been successful in sport.
