= Martin Kulldorff =

Swedish biostatistician (born 1962)

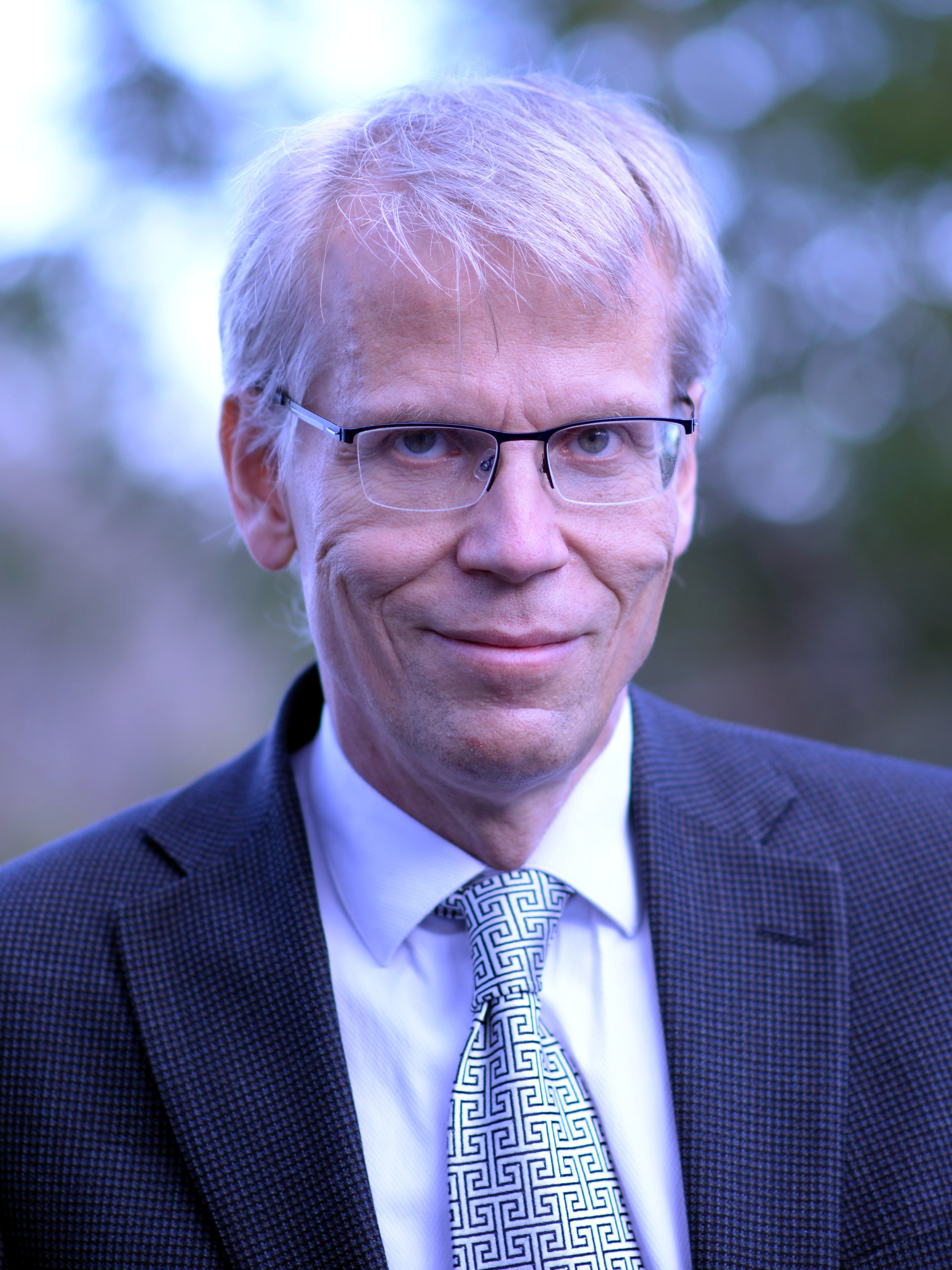
- Born: 1962 (age 63–64); Lund, Sweden
- Education: Umeå University (BS); Cornell University (MS, PhD)
- Known for: Creator of software SaTScan, Co-author of Great Barrington Declaration
- Father: Gunnar Kulldorff
- Scientific career
- Fields: Mathematical sciences; Operations research
- Workplaces: National Cancer Institute; University of Connecticut; Uppsala University; Harvard Medical School; Brigham and Women's Hospital
- Thesis: Optimal Control of Favorable Games with a Time Limit (1989)
- Doctoral advisor: David Clay Heath

Martin Kulldorff (born 1962) is a Swedish biostatistician. He was a professor of medicine at Harvard Medical School from 2003 until his dismissal in 2024. He is a member of the US Food and Drug Administration's Drug Safety and Risk Management Advisory Committee and a former member of the Vaccine Safety Subgroup of the Advisory Committee on Immunization Practices at the Centers for Disease Control and Prevention.

In 2020, Kulldorff was a co-author of the Great Barrington Declaration, which advocated lifting COVID-19 restrictions on lower-risk groups to develop herd immunity through infection before vaccines became available, while promoting the fringe notion that vulnerable people could somehow be simultaneously protected from the virus. The declaration was widely rejected, and was criticized as being unethical and infeasible by Tedros Adhanom Ghebreyesus, the director-general of the World Health Organization. Former NIH director Francis S. Collins called him a "fringe epidemiologist".

During the pandemic, Kulldorff opposed disease control measures such as vaccination of children, lockdowns, contact tracing, and mask mandates.

== Early life and education ==
Kulldorff was born in Lund, Sweden, in 1962, the son of Barbro and Gunnar Kulldorff. He grew up in Umeå and received a BSc in mathematical statistics from Umeå University in 1984. He moved to the United States for his postgraduate studies as a Fulbright fellow, obtaining a Ph.D. in operations research from Cornell University in 1989. His doctoral thesis, titled Optimal Control of Favorable Games with a Time Limit, was written under the direction of David Clay Heath.

== Career ==
Kulldorff was an associate professor at the Department of Community Medicine at the University of Connecticut for five years and an associate professor at the Department of Statistics at Uppsala University for six years. He has also worked as a scientist at the National Institutes of Health in the US. From 2003 to 2021 he was a professor of medicine at Harvard Medical School, and from 2015 to 2021 he was also a biostatistician at the Brigham and Women's Hospital.

With Farzad Mostashari, Kulldorff developed SaTScan, a free software program used for geographical and hospital disease surveillance which is widely used, as well as a TreeScan software program for data mining. He is the co-developer of the R-Sequential software program for exact sequential analysis. He helped develop and implement statistical methods used by the Vaccine Safety Datalink (VSD) project that the CDC uses, among other tools, to discover and evaluate vaccine health and safety risks.

During the COVID-19 pandemic, Kulldorff advised Florida governor Ron DeSantis on health policy. In a September 2020 meeting he advocated aiming for herd immunity by not inhibiting the virus, saying that young people could "live normal life" until it had been reached, at which point older people could live more normal lives too. and co-authored the Great Barrington Declaration.

In 2021, Kulldorff was named a senior scientific director at the Brownstone Institute, a right-wing think tank launched by Jeffrey Tucker that publishes articles challenging various measures against COVID-19, presenting research supporting authors' opinions, and discussing alternative measures. Jay Bhattacharya and Sunetra Gupta, his co-authors on the Great Barrington Declaration, also have had roles there. Tucker is the former editorial director of the American Institute for Economic Research (AIER), where the declaration was signed.

In December 2021, Kulldorff became one of the first three fellows, along with Bhattacharya and Scott Atlas, at the Academy for Science and Freedom, a program of the private, conservative Hillsdale College, a liberal arts school.

In March 2024, Kulldorff announced that Harvard had dismissed him. Kulldorff had refused a COVID vaccination that was required by Mass General Brigham, the hospital through which Harvard employed him as Medical School faculty.

In 2025 Kulldorff, along with Jay Bhattacharya and others, founded the Journal of the Academy of Public Health, with Kulldorff serving as one of two editors-in-chief. The journal only publishes work by members of the newly formed "Academy of Public Health,"and is a subsidiary of the Real Clear Foundation, a conservative donor funded organization. The journal has received criticism, with evolutionary biologist Carl Bergstrom describing it as, "dominated [by] a small clique of contrarians around the COVID pandemic," bibliometrics researcher Jens Peter Andersen describing it as "incredibly problematic," and Mallory Harris, a postdoc at the University of Maryland, stating it appears to be a "parallel structure" to facilitate research that wouldn't be accepted in other publications.

In June 2025, U.S. secretary of health and human services Robert F. Kennedy Jr. named Kulldorff to the Advisory Committee on Immunization Practices.

== Views on COVID-19 ==
In 2020, Kulldorff was invited to meet with leaders, lawyers and staff at the American Institute for Economic Research (AIER), an American libertarian think tank. Following the meeting, Kulldorff took the lead in an effort to oppose lockdowns in favor of pursuing COVID-19 herd immunity before vaccines became available. His efforts resulted in the Great Barrington Declaration, an open letter co-authored with Oxford's Sunetra Gupta and Stanford's Jay Bhattacharya for the AIER. The document stated that lower-risk groups would develop herd immunity through infection, while vulnerable groups should be protected from the virus. The World Health Organization, the National Institutes of Health and other public-health bodies said such a policy lacked a sound scientific basis. Scientists dismissed the policy as impossible in practice, unethical and pseudoscientific, warning that attempting to implement it could cause many unnecessary deaths with the potential of recurrent waves of disease spread as immunity decreases over time. Francis S. Collins, N.I.H. director at the time, has said the authors were "fringe epidemiologists".

Kulldorff and the other authors met with US officials of the first Trump administration to share their ideas on 5 October 2020, the day after the declaration was made public.

During the pandemic, Kulldorff opposed all COVID-19 control measures. The measures he opposed included lockdowns, contact tracing, vaccine mandates, and mask mandates. He has spoken out against vaccine passports, stating they disproportionately harm the working class. Kulldorff and Bhattacharya opposed broad vaccine mandates, stating that the mortality risk is "a thousand fold higher" in older people than in younger people. He has argued against COVID-19 vaccinations for children, saying that alleged risks outweigh the benefits.

In an op-ed in the Wall Street Journal co-authored with Jay Bhattacharya, the authors stated that COVID-19 testing should not be used to "check asymptomatic children to see if it is safe for them to come to school" because of the difference in mortality risk for young persons compared to older persons. Instead, the authors wrote that "[w]ith the new CDC guidelines, strategic age-targeted viral testing will protect older people from deadly COVID-19 exposure and children and young adults from needless school closures."

On 18 March 2021, Kulldorff participated in an online roundtable with the governor Florida, Ron DeSantis, to discuss COVID-19. In the video, which was posted on YouTube, DeSantis asked the group if children should wear masks in school, and Kulldorff responded, "Children should not wear face masks. No. They don't need it for their own protection and they don't need it for protecting other people, either." In April, YouTube removed the recording of the roundtable, asserting it violated YouTube's policy regarding medical information. At the time the video was published, the Centers for Disease Control recommended universal indoor masking for children two years and older.

Kulldorff was a member of the Vaccine Safety Technical subgroup of CDC's Advisory Committee on Immunization Practices. In April 2021, he disagreed with the CDC's pause of the Janssen COVID-19 vaccine rollout and argued publicly that the vaccine's benefits outweighed clotting risks, particularly for older people.

In December 2021, Kulldorff published an essay for the Brownstone Institute in which he argued against children receiving vaccinations against COVID-19, falsely claiming that influenza was a greater risk to children than COVID-19. In a critical response published in Science-Based Medicine, Jonathan Howard noted errors and factual inaccuracies in Kulldorff's essay, pointing out that while influenza was responsible for only one child death in the US 2020–2021 season—while public health mitigation of COVID-19 was in place—COVID-19 killed more than 1,000 children in the US. In addition to this, Kulldorff's essay omitted that children who are infected with COVID-19 are at risk for rare but serious conditions, such as MIS-C, with 8,862 confirmed cases of children with MIS-C by March 2023.

On 13 February 2022, Kulldorff tweeted in support of the Canada convoy protest, which was organized to protest against vaccine mandates and other government restrictions regarding COVID-19. In December 2022, Florida Governor Ron DeSantis named Kulldorff, Bhattacharya, and several other opponents of the scientific consensus on COVID-19 vaccines to his newly formed Public Health Integrity Committee to "offer critical assessments" of recommendations from federal health agencies.

== Personal life ==
Kuldorff has written that he has alpha-1 antitrypsin deficiency.
