= United States Marine Hospital (Cleveland) =

United States Marine Hospital of Cleveland

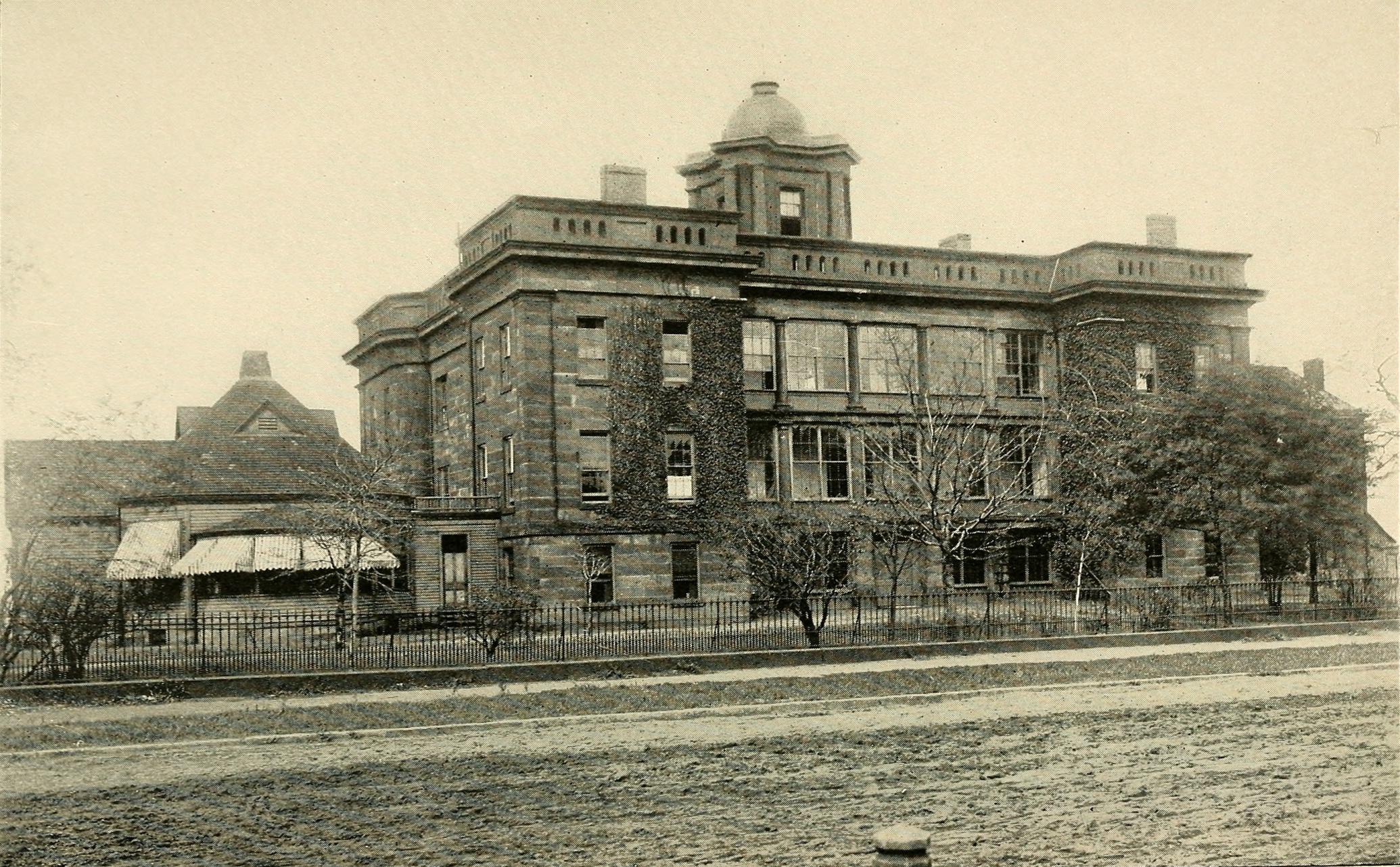
- Cleveland Marine Hospital from Lakeside Avenue in 1896

Geography
- Location: Lakeside and E 9th street, Cleveland, Ohio, United States
- Coordinates: 41.506°N 81.692°W

Organization
- Type: General
- Network: Marine Hospital Service

Services
- Beds: 150

History
- Constructed: 1844
- Opened: 1852
- Closed: 1953

Links
- Lists: Hospitals in Ohio
- Other links: Marine Hospital Service

The Cleveland Marine Hospital was a historic federal hospital located in Cleveland established to provide medical care for members of the United States Merchant Marine, United States Coast Guard, and other eligible beneficiaries.

== First hospital ==
The hospital was part of a national network of government-owned hospitals for seamen, authorized by the United States Congress and the United States President in 1837. This network eventually grew to 26 facilities.

The Cleveland Marine Hospital was situated on the corner of Erie Street (later East 9th Street) and Lakeside Avenue. Simon Porter was the architect for this building. Construction on the hospital began in 1844, but the facility did not officially open until 1852. The structure was a three-story building designed in the Ionic style. It featured eight wards and had the capacity to accommodate 150 patients.

=== Civil War and operational shifts ===
Following the American Civil War, the Marine Hospital expanded its services to treat both soldiers and sailors until 1870. As the demand for services specifically for sailors declined in the mid-1870s, the City of Cleveland petitioned Congress in 1874 to lease the facility.

In 1875, the Cleveland City Hospital successfully leased the building and grounds for a 20-year term. During this period, the facility underwent significant physical improvements, including the addition of an amphitheater for clinical lectures and a dedicated children's ward.

=== Later history ===
When the 20-year lease expired in 1895, and with the completion of the new Lakeside Hospital, the Cleveland Marine Hospital property reverted to the control of the federal government (the Marine Hospital Service, which later became the United States Public Health Service). In 1929, the original building and site were sold to the Pennsylvania Railroad.

== Second hospital ==
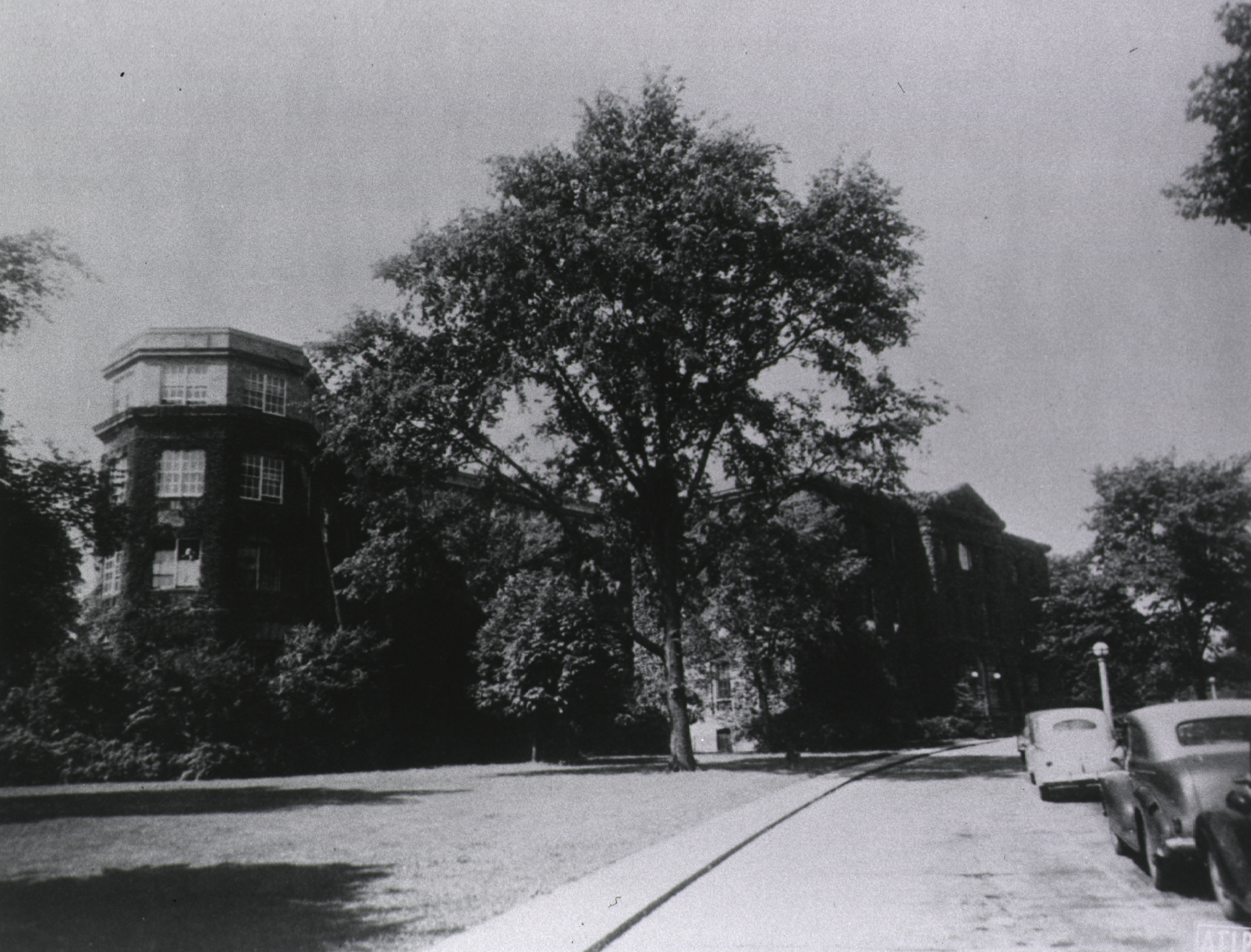
Cleveland Marine Hospital on Fairhill Road (c. 1940)

A new, replacement U.S. Marine Hospital was constructed at a new location on East 124th Street and Fairhill Road.

Following the establishment of the Cleveland Veterans Administration Medical Center in June 1953, the Marine Hospital on Fairhill Road was declared surplus government property. The site was subsequently given to the state of Ohio and repurposed as the Fairhill Mental Health Center.

== See also ==
- Marine Hospital Service
- List of U.S. Marine Hospitals
- University Hospitals Cleveland Medical Center
- United States Public Health Service
