= Marine Hospital Service =

Former medical organization

Marine Hospital Service Act
- Other short titles: Act for the Relief of Sick and Disabled Seamen
- Long title: An Act for the relief of sick and disabled seamen
- Enacted by: the 5th United States Congress
- Effective: July 16, 1798

Citations
- Statutes at Large: 1 Stat. 605

Legislative history
- Signed into law by President John Adams on July 16, 1798

Flag of the Marine Hospital Service

The Marine Hospital Service was an organization of Marine Hospitals dedicated to the care of ill and disabled sailors in the United States Merchant Marines, the U.S. Coast Guard and other federal beneficiaries. The Marine Hospital Service evolved into the U.S. Public Health Service.

It was the point of origin for several components of the current Public Health Service, including the Public Health Service Commissioned Corps, the National Institutes of Health, and multiple programs now incorporated into the Health Resources and Services Administration.

== History ==
=== Background: Marine Hospital Fund ===
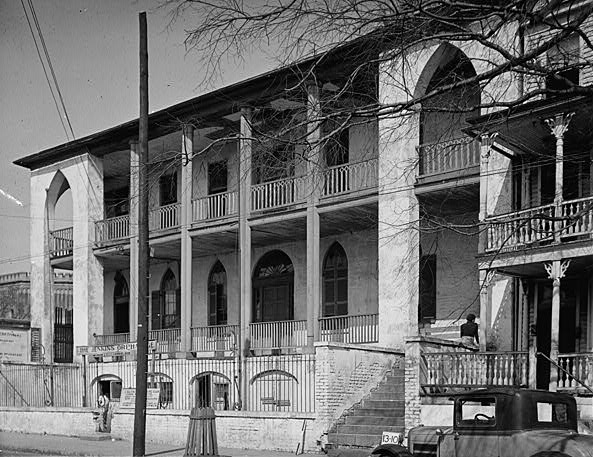
Marine Hospital in Charleston, South Carolina, built in 1833

The origins of the system of Marine Hospitals can be traced to the passage, by the 5th Congress of the United States, of "An Act for the Relief of Sick and Disabled Seamen" in 1798. This act created Marine Hospitals to care for sick seamen. The Marine Hospital Fund was placed under the Revenue Marine Service (a forerunner of the present-day Coast Guard) within the Department of the Treasury.

It was the first federal health law. It authorized a tax, which was the deduction of twenty cents per month from the wages of the seamen. This tax raised funds for physicians and to support the network of hospitals. The tax was about 1% of the wages of maritime sailors. (In 1884, the tax was abolished and in 1906 funds were dispensed by Congress.)

The act led to the gradual creation of a network of hospitals along coastal and inland waterways. They were initially located along the East Coast, at the harbors of the major port cities, with Boston being the site of the first such facility, followed later by others including in the Baltimore vicinity at Curtis Bay. As the boundaries of the United States expanded, and harbors were built on other coasts, so too were marine hospitals. In the 1830s and 1840s they were built along inland waterways, the Great Lakes, and the Gulf of Mexico. After the acquisition of the Oregon Territory (1846) and California (1848) hospitals were built in 1850s at Pacific Coast harbors.

Following the Civil War, public outcry and scandal surrounded the Marine Hospital Fund. In 1869, Dr. John Shaw Billings, a prominent Army surgeon, was appointed to head an investigation of the Marine Hospital Fund. Dr. Billings found the hospital fund to be inadequate and completely disorganized.

=== Establishment ===
In June 1870 the 41st Congress formally converted the loose network of locally controlled marine hospitals, the Marine Hospital Fund, into a centrally controlled Marine Hospital Service, with its headquarters in Washington, D.C. This reorganization made the Marine Hospital Service into its own bureau within the Department of the Treasury.

Dr. John Maynard Woodworth was subsequently appointed to the Service as "Supervising Surgeon." He transformed the service into a disciplined organization based on his experience in the Union Army as a surgeon. Dr. Woodworth required his physicians to be a mobile work force stationed where the service was in need, and he mandated they daily wear uniforms. This eventually led to the creation of the modern-day Public Health Service Commissioned Corps. Dr. Woodworth, using Army-style heraldry, created the Marine Hospital Service fouled anchor and caduceus seal which is used to this day by the Public Health Service. In 1873, Dr. Woodworth's title was changed to "Supervising Surgeon General," a forerunner of the modern-day office of Surgeon General of the United States.

Woodworth created a cadre of mobile, career service physicians, who could be assigned as needed to the various Marine Hospitals. The commissioned officer corps was established by legislation in 1889, and signed by President Grover Cleveland. At first open only to physicians, over the course of the 20th century, the Corps expanded to include veterinarians, dentists, physician assistants, sanitary engineers, pharmacists, nurses, environmental health officers, scientists, and other types of health professionals. It is now known as the Commissioned Corps of the U.S. Public Health Service.

=== Increasing scope ===
The scope of activities of the Marine Hospital Service began to expand well beyond the care of merchant seamen in the closing decades of the nineteenth century, beginning with the control of infectious disease. Starting in the mid-14th century, ships entering harbors were quarantined when any of the crew was sick. This practice was normal procedure at United States harbors, with quarantine originally a function of the individual states, rather than of the Federal Government. The National Quarantine Act of 1878 vested quarantine authority to the Marine Hospital Service. However, the Public Health Act of 1879 created the National Board of Health, through which quarantine authority was shared with the U.S. Army and Navy; this arrangement was not reauthorized by Congress in 1883, and its powers reverted solely to the Marine Hospital Service. Over the next half a century, the Marine Hospital Service increasingly took over quarantine functions from individual state authorities.

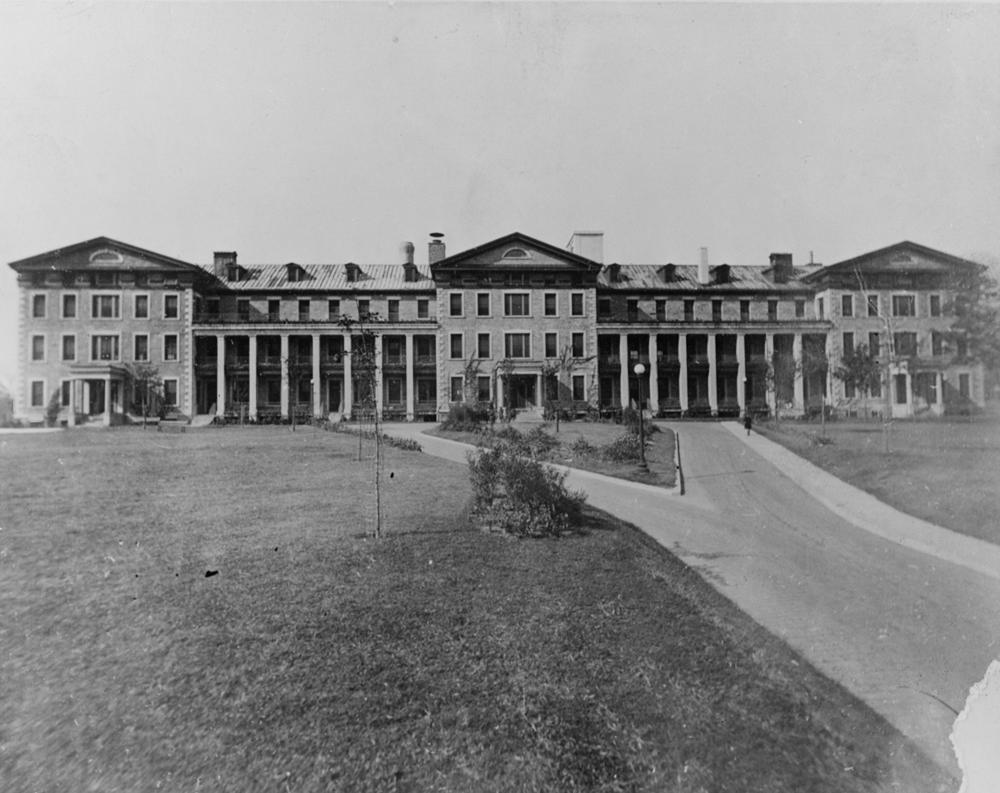
The Marine Hospital, Staten Island, N.Y. In 1887, the National Institute of Health began as a single room Laboratory of Hygiene for bacteriological investigation established by the U.S. Marine Hospital Service at Stapleton, Staten Island, New York. From 1887 to 1891, the hygienic laboratory was located in the attic of the Marine Hospital on Staten Island.

The Marine Hospitals, as their name suggests, were hospitals constructed at key sea and river ports across the nation to provide health care for merchant marine sailors. Aside from the well-being of these sailors, the hospitals provided a key monitoring and gate-keeping function against pathogenic diseases. As immigration increased dramatically in the late 19th century, the Federal Government also took over the processing of immigrants from the individual states, beginning in 1891. The Marine Hospital Service was assigned the responsibility for the medical inspection of arriving immigrants at sites such as Ellis Island in New York Harbor. Commissioned officers played a major role in fulfilling the Service's commitment to prevent disease from entering the country.

As the nation grew, the scope of Marine Hospital Service's duties grew to include domestic and foreign quarantine and other national public health functions. Over time, the hospitals of the service were also expanded to include research and prevention work as well as the care of patients. Aside from merchant seamen, members of the military, immigrants, Native Americans, other federal beneficiaries, and people affected by chronic and epidemic diseases found a source for health care in the MHS and its hospitals.

In 1899, the Marine Hospital Service first formed internal divisions: the Division of Marine Hospitals and Relief, Division of Domestic (Interstate) Quarantine, Division of Insular and Foreign Quarantine and Immigration, Division of Personnel and Accounts, Division of Sanitary Reports and Statistics, Division of Scientific Research and Sanitation, and Miscellaneous Division, although there were minor name changes after this time.

=== Transformation into Public Health Service ===
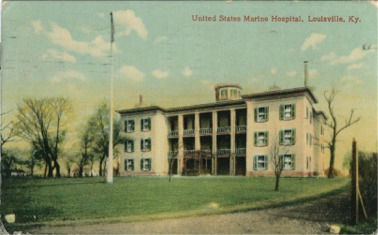
U.S. Marine Hospital in Louisville, Kentucky (c.1909)

In 1902, the Marine Hospital Service was renamed the "Public Health and Marine-Hospital Service." In 1912, as the emphasis of its responsibilities shifted from sailors to general public health, the name was changed again to the "Public Health Service" to encompass its diverse and changing mission.

Flag of the U.S. Public Health and Marine Hospital Service

The Division of Hospitals, which contained the Marine Hospital system, became part of the Bureau of Medical Services in 1943, and was eventually renamed as a different Bureau of Medical Services within the Health Services Administration in 1973. Large new buildings were constructed for many Marine Hospitals in the 1920s and 1930s, and the system reached its peak of 30 hospitals in 1943. A wave of closings in 1944–1953 mainly targeted hospitals that had not been upgraded, and another wave during 1965–1970 closed the remaining hospitals at inland locations, leaving eight general hospitals and the National Leprosarium operating. The system was abolished in 1981, with the last eight general hospitals transferred to other organizations, and the remaining functions of the Bureau of Medical Services merged into the present Bureau of Primary Health Care within the Health Resources and Services Administration (HRSA). PHS would however continue to operate the National Leprosarium until 1999.

Other pre-1912 divisions of the Marine Hospital Service have descendants that operate to the present day:

- The Division of Domestic Quarantine became the Division of States Relations and then the Bureau of State Services in 1943. This bureau would eventually give rise to the modern Centers for Disease Control and Prevention (CDC), as well as the HRSA Bureau of Health Workforce and Healthcare Systems Bureau.
- The Division of Scientific Research became the National Institutes of Health. The Environmental Health Divisions (predecessor of the Environmental Protection Agency and FDA Center for Devices and Radiological Health), and the Division of Industrial Hygiene (predecessor of the National Institute for Occupational Safety and Health), were spun off from it in the mid-20th century.
- The Division of Foreign Quarantine eventually became the CDC Division of Global Migration and Quarantine.
- The Division of Sanitary Reports and Statistics was an ancestor of the CDC National Center for Health Statistics.

Today, the records for these institutions sit in storage at the National Library of Medicine in Bethesda, Maryland and the National Archives in College Park, Maryland.

== Hospitals ==
The hospitals themselves were, by the middle of the 19th century, fairly imposing and architecturally grand structures in many cases. As long as ample federal funding was available for their construction, these hospitals were impressive examples of government-provided health care. The hospitals of the early 20th century in major port cities such as New Orleans, San Francisco, and Savannah displayed ornate architectural detail and reflected many of the changes sweeping medicine at the time.

In addition to the major hospitals, many lower-class hospitals and clinics existed.

A chronological gallery of hospitals constructed prior to 1912 follow, showing the year operations began as a U.S. Marine Hospitals. Not all hospitals are shown. Structures that are still extant are marked with an asterisk (*).

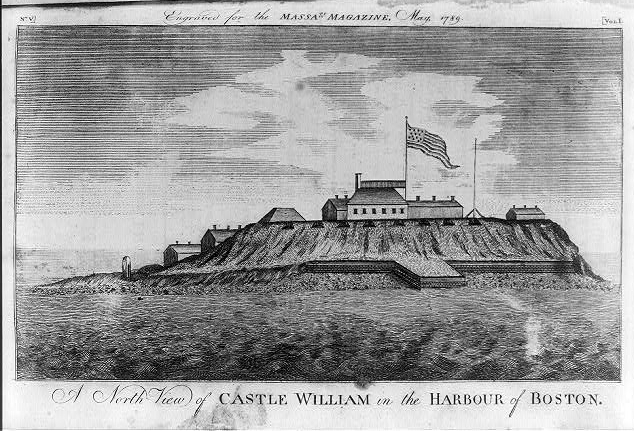
Temporary Boston hospital at Castle Island, 1800

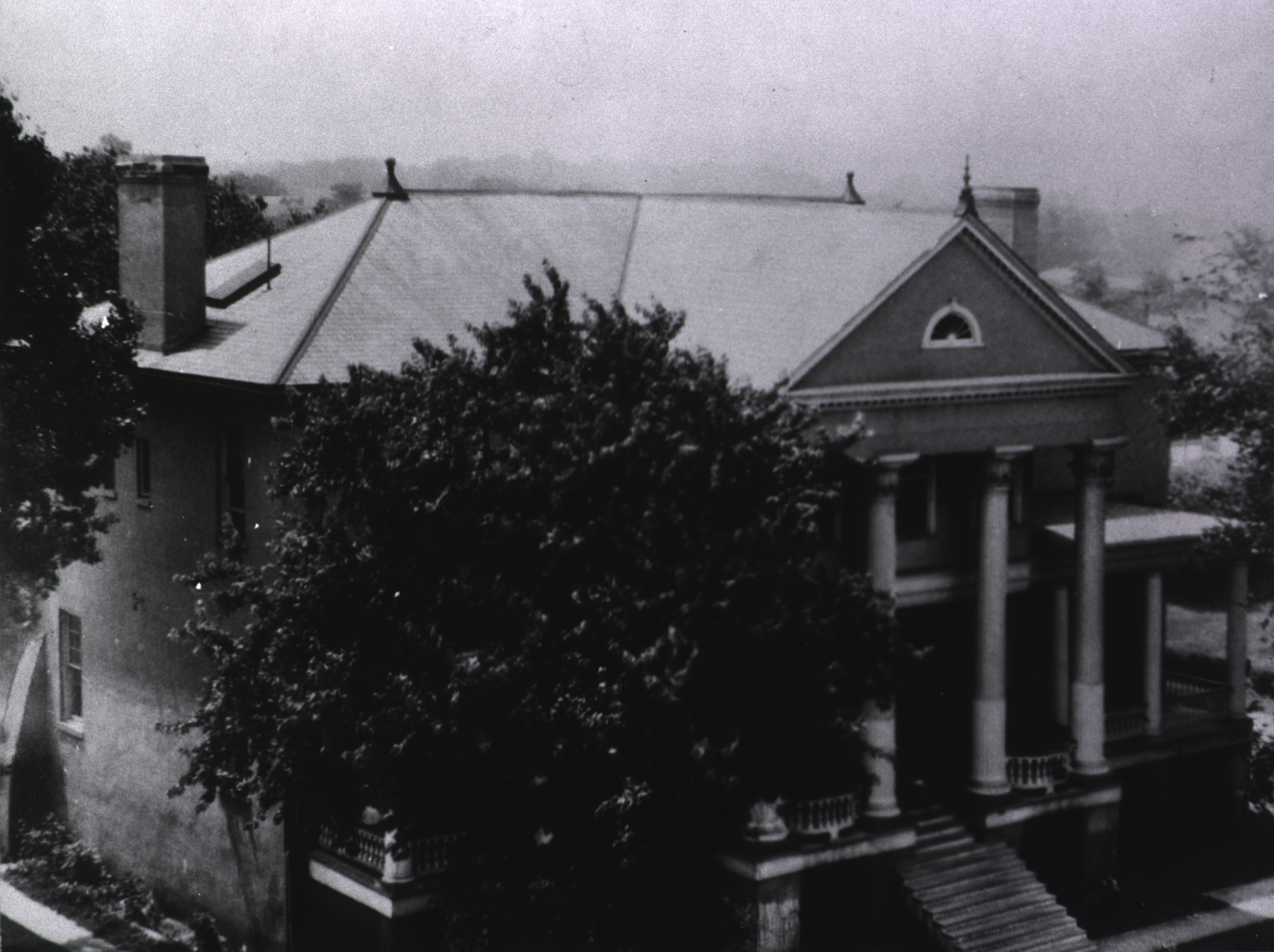
Norfolk, Virginia hospital, 1800

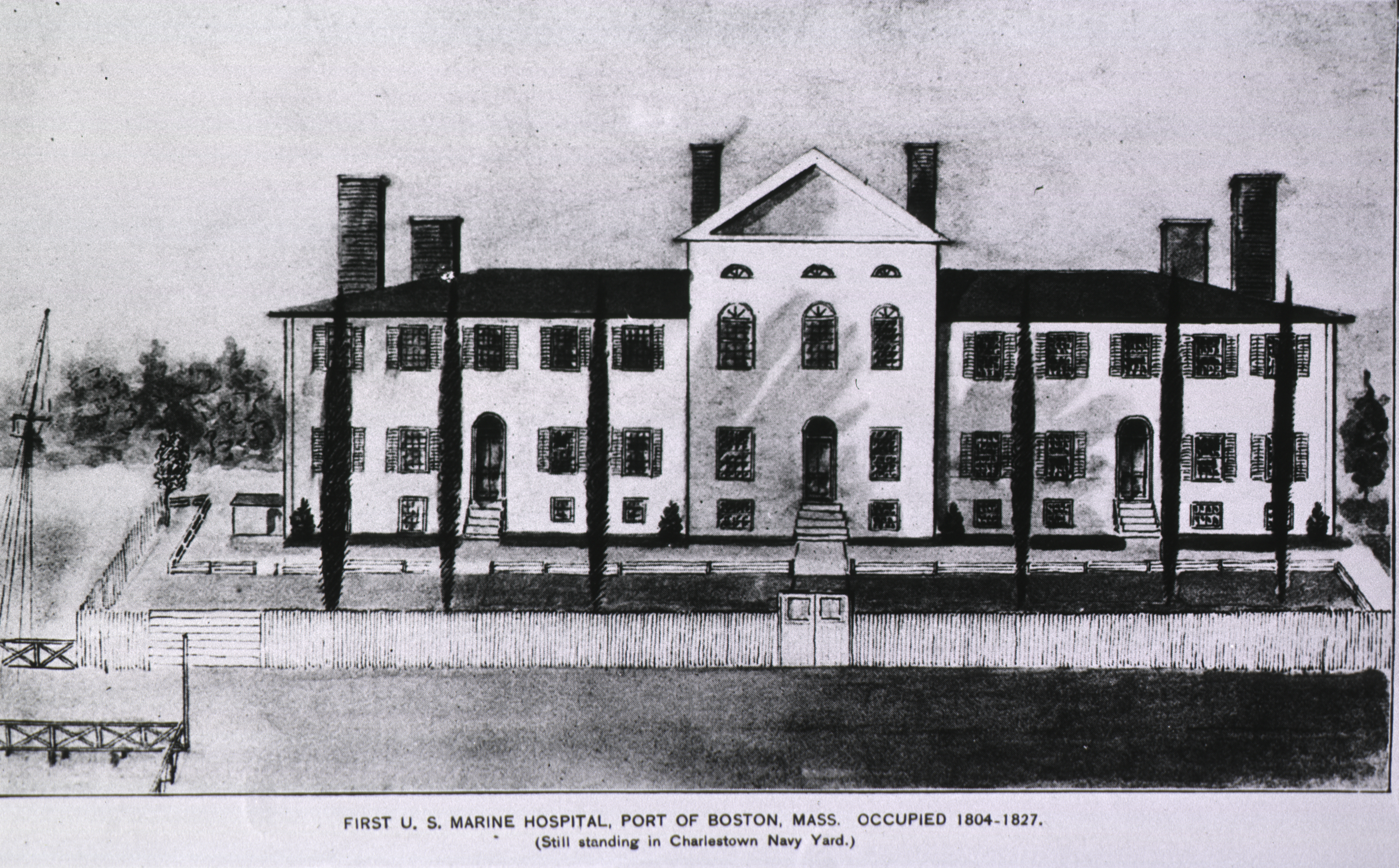
Second Boston hospital at Charlestown Navy Yard, 1804

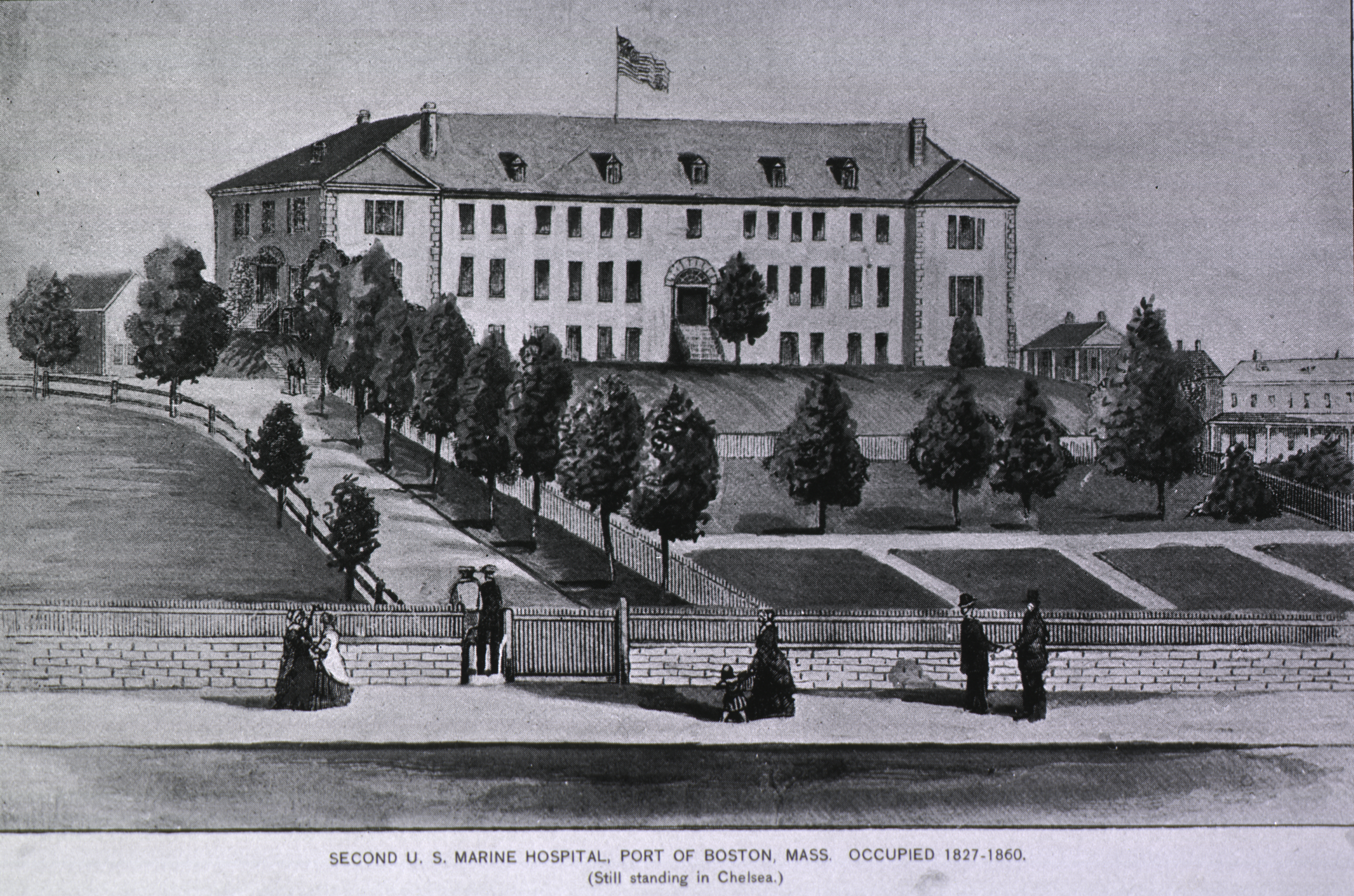
Fourth Boston hospital in Chelsea, Massachusetts, 1827

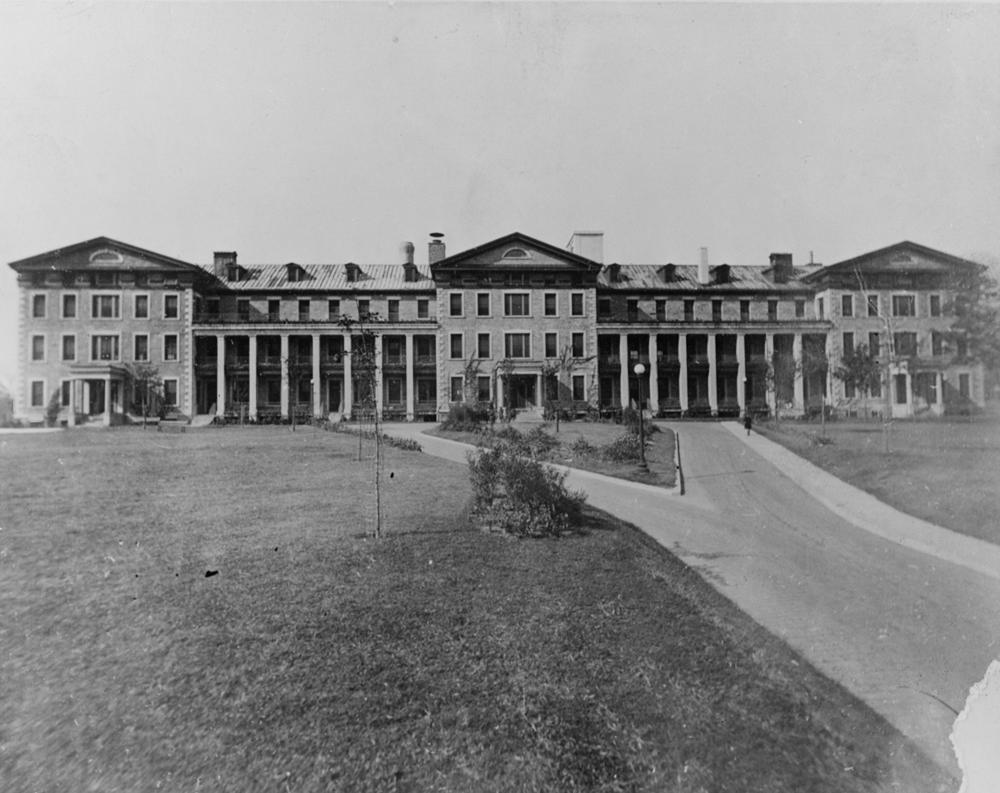
Stapleton, Staten Island hospital, 1831*

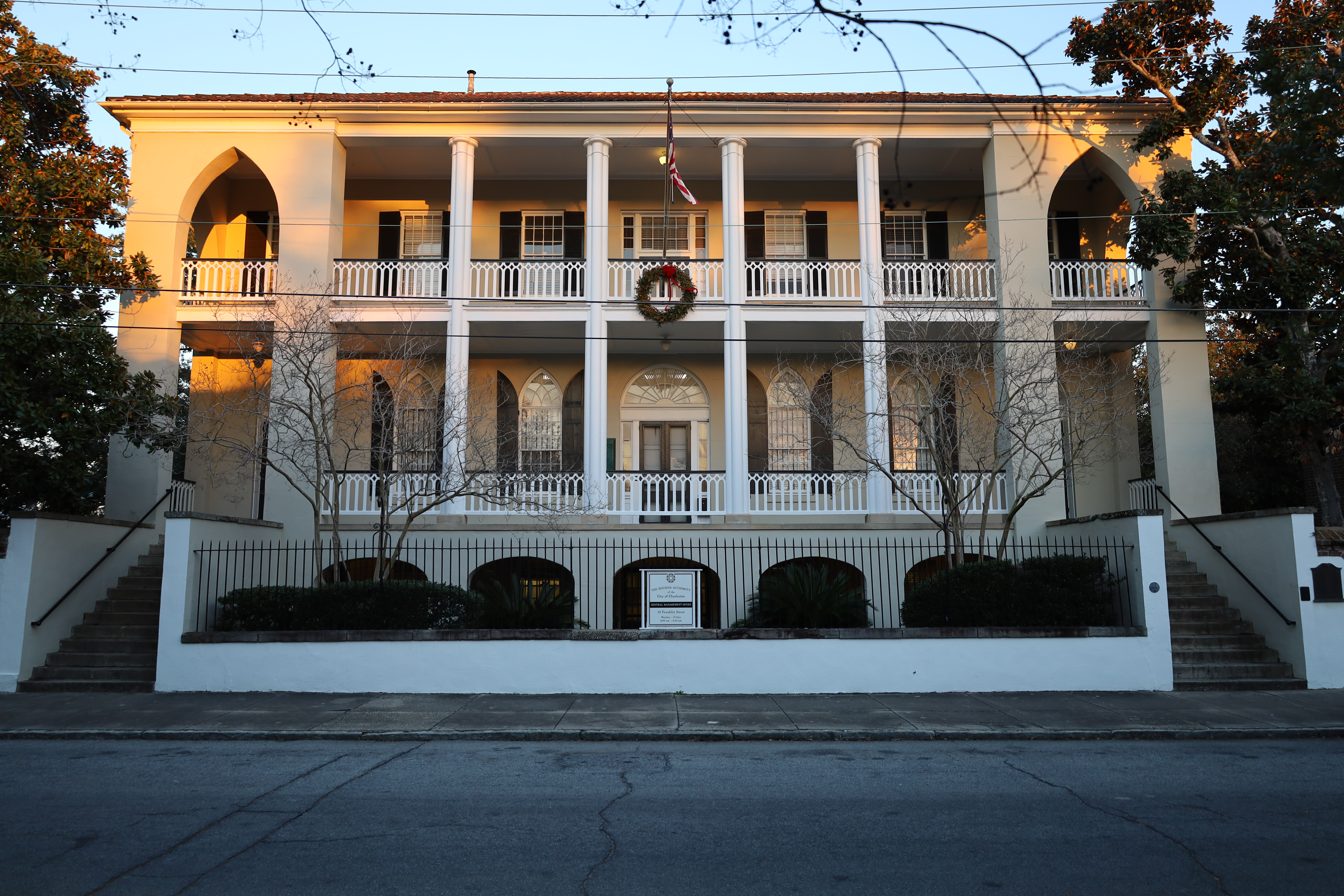
Charleston, South Carolina hospital, 1833*

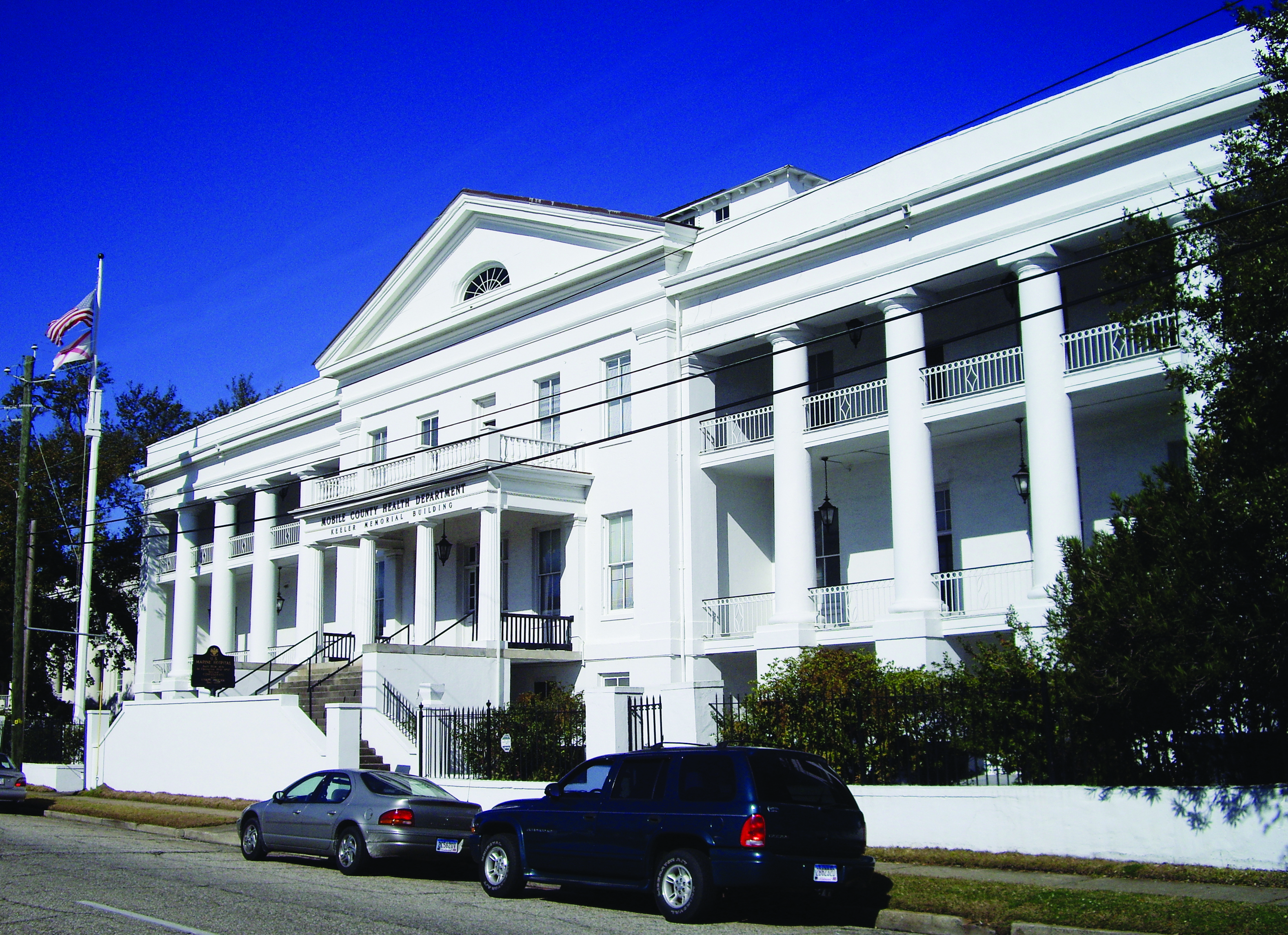
Mobile, Alabama hospital, 1843*

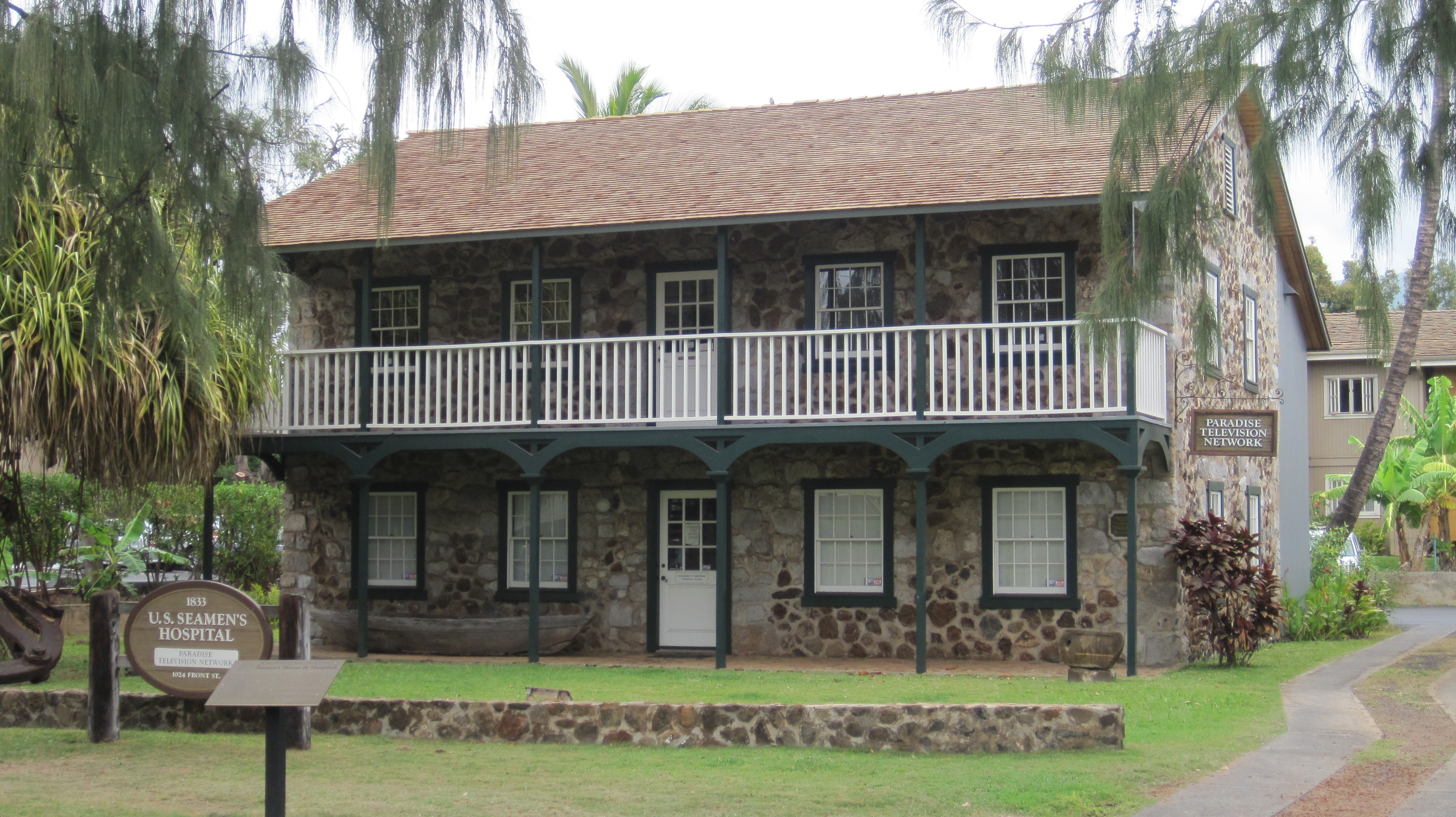
Lahaina, Hawaii hospital, 1844

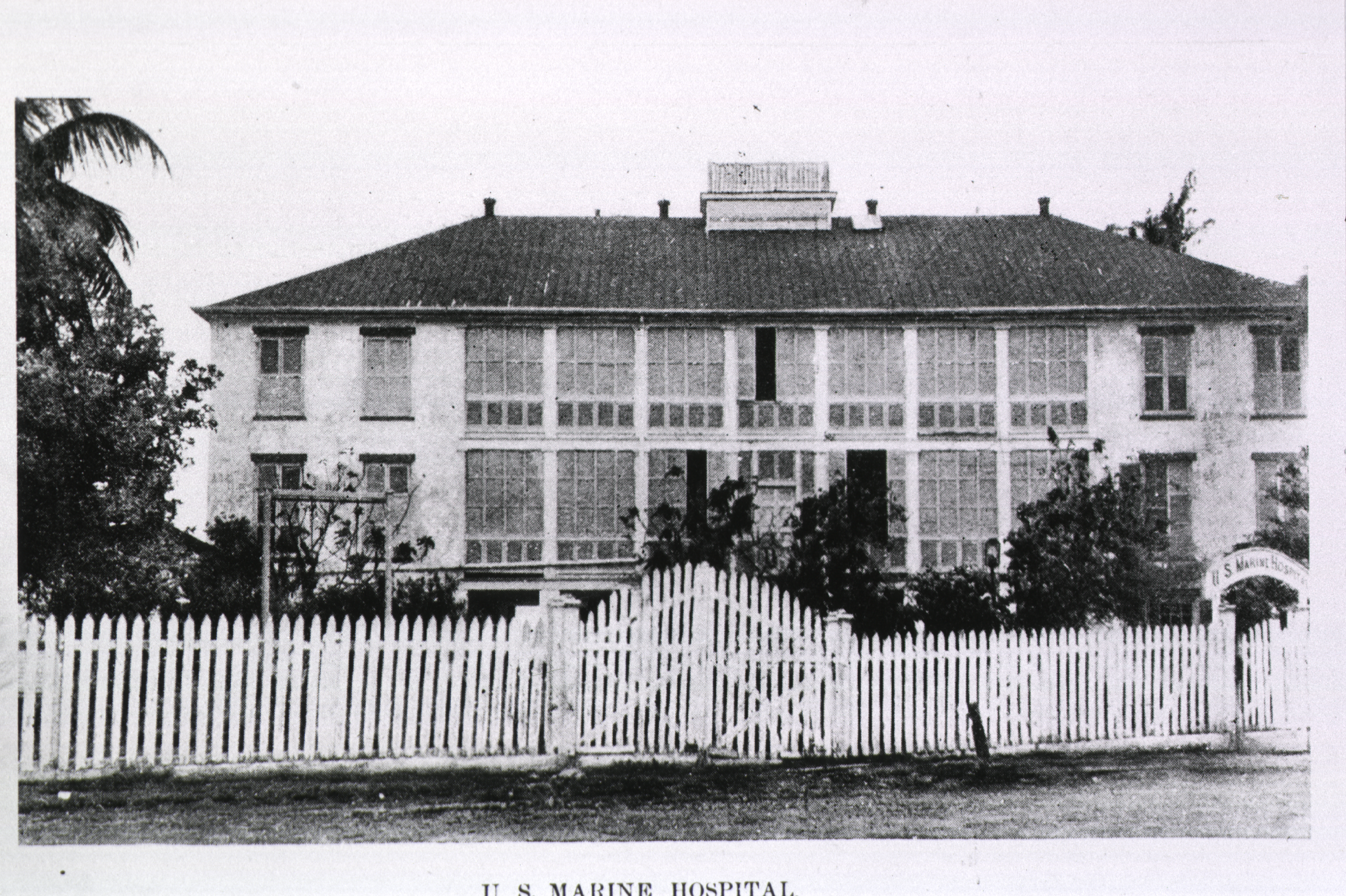
Key West, Florida hospital, 1845*

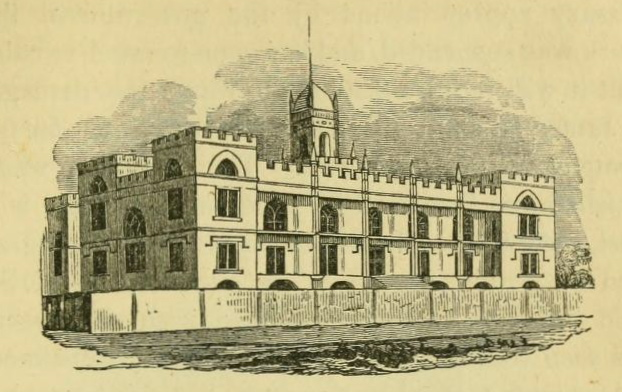
First New Orleans hospital at Algiers, 1847

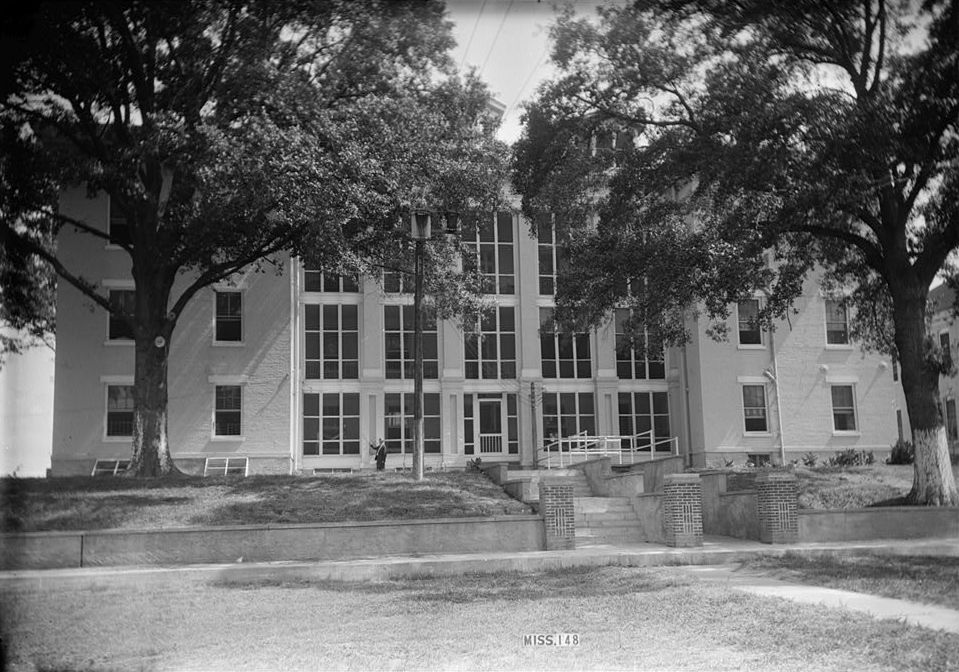
Natchez, Mississippi hospital, 1852

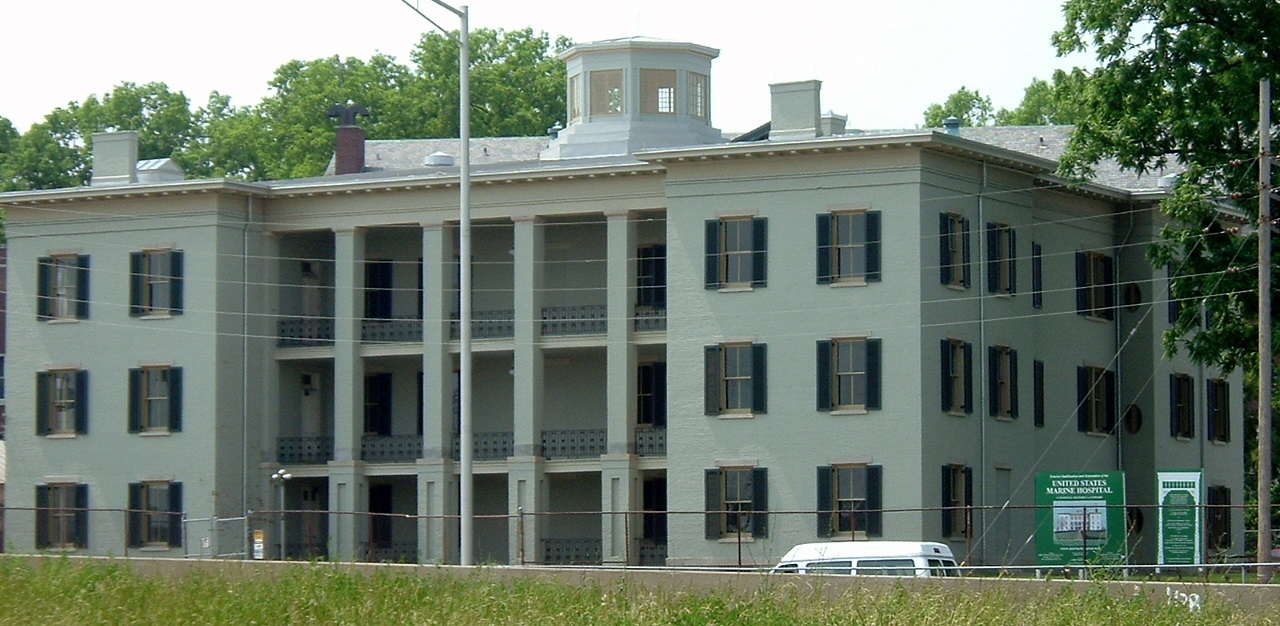
Louisville, Kentucky hospital, 1852*

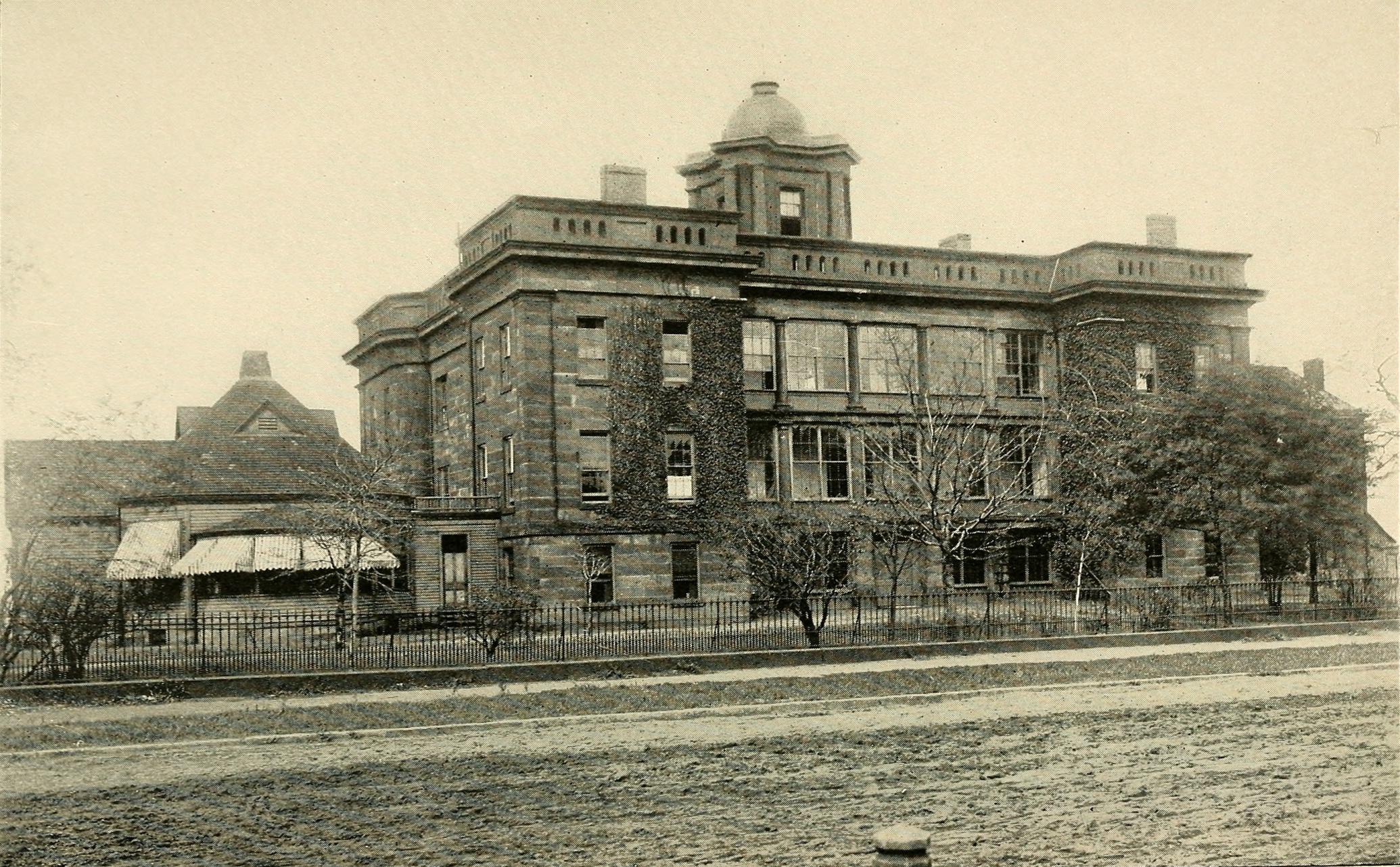
Cleveland Marine Hospital, 1852

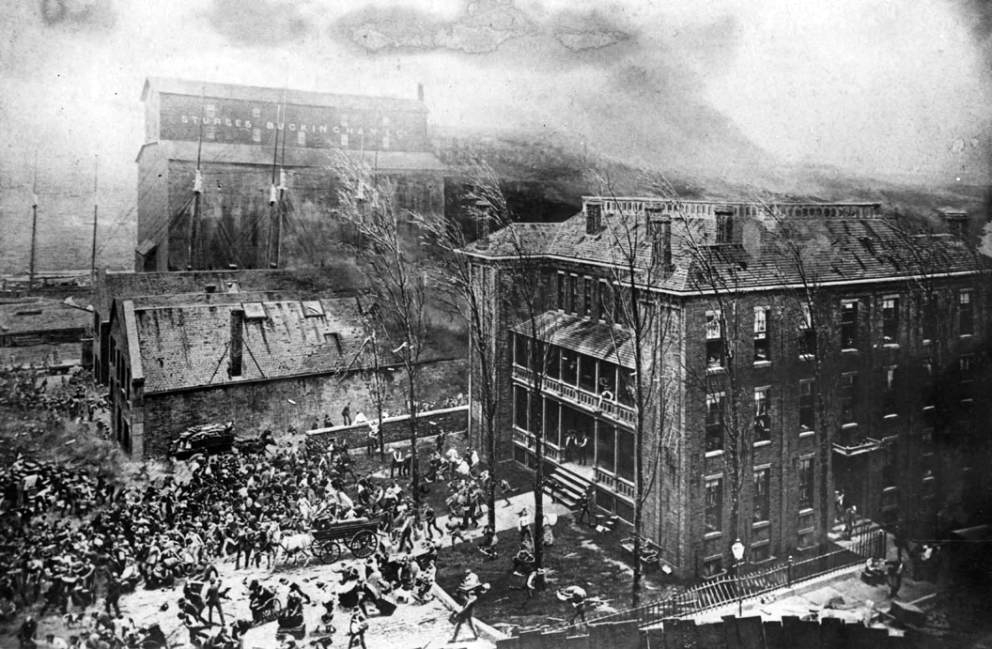
First Chicago hospital at Fort Dearborn, 1852

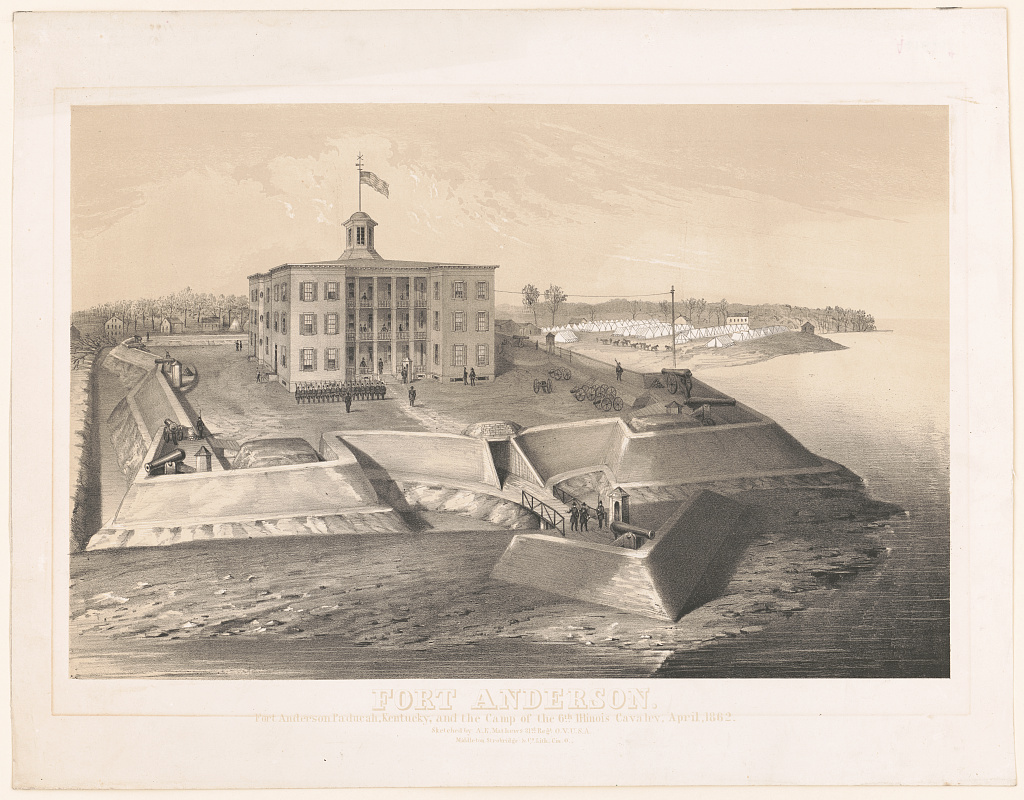
Paducah, Kentucky hospital, 1852

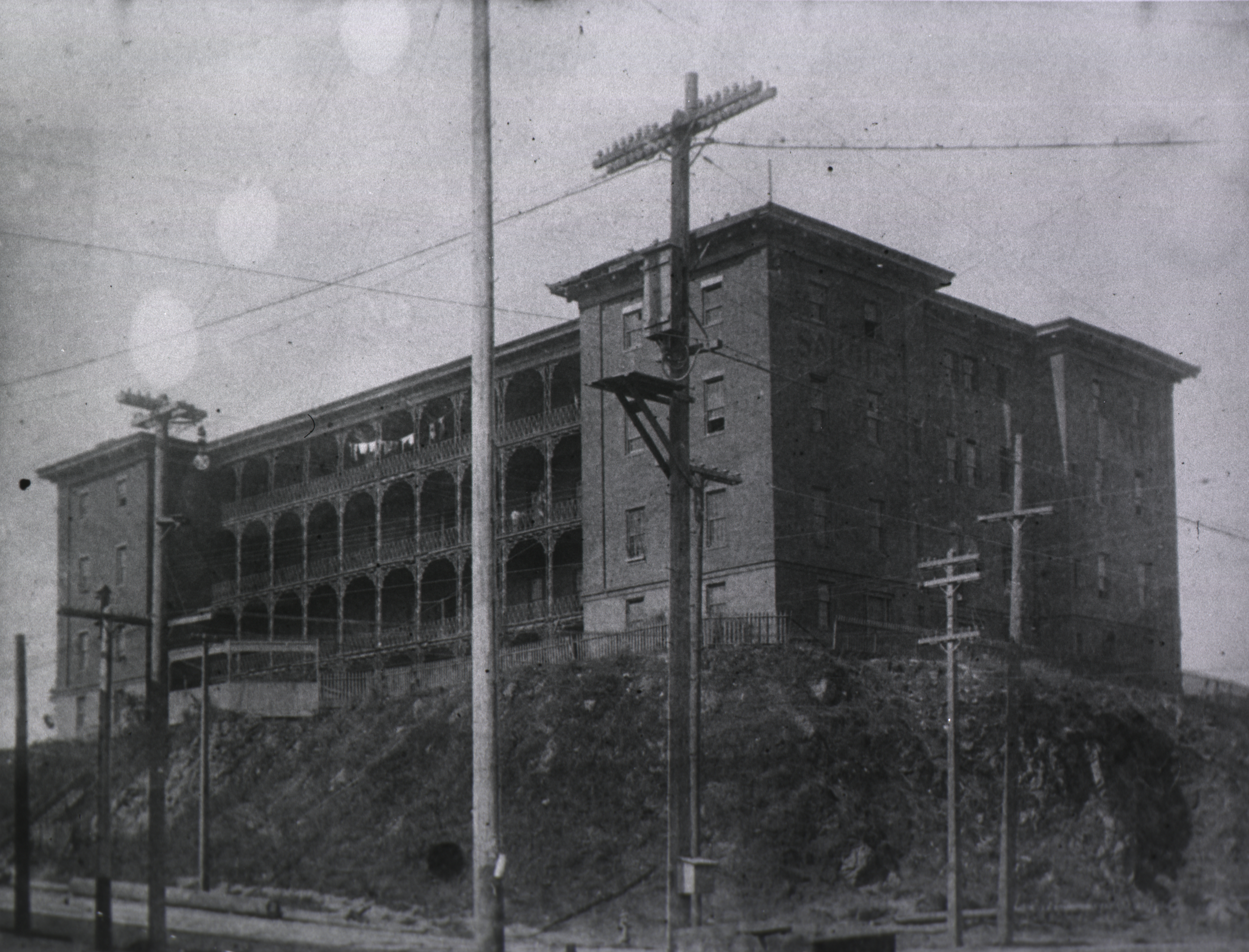
First San Francisco hospital at Rincon Point, 1854

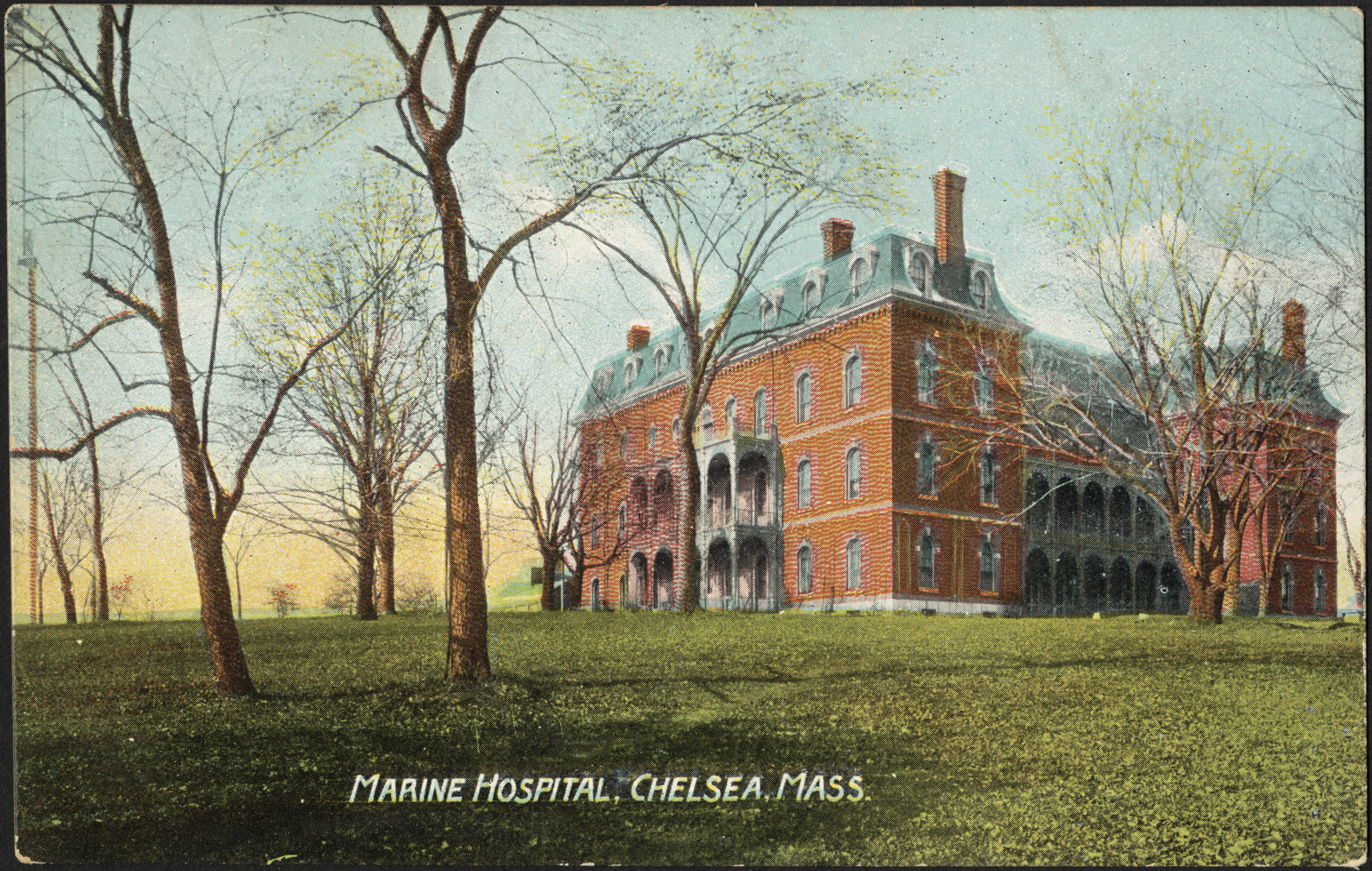
Fifth Boston hospital in Chelsea, Massachusetts, 1857*

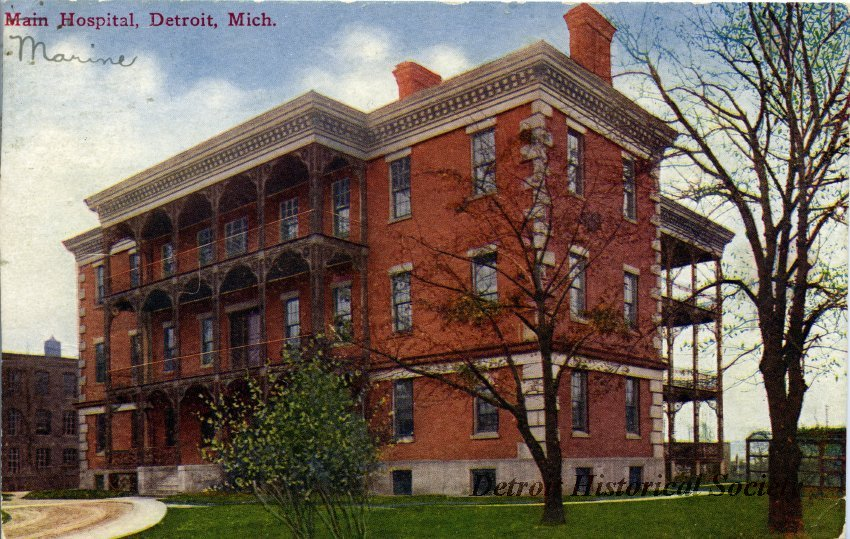
Detroit hospital, 1857

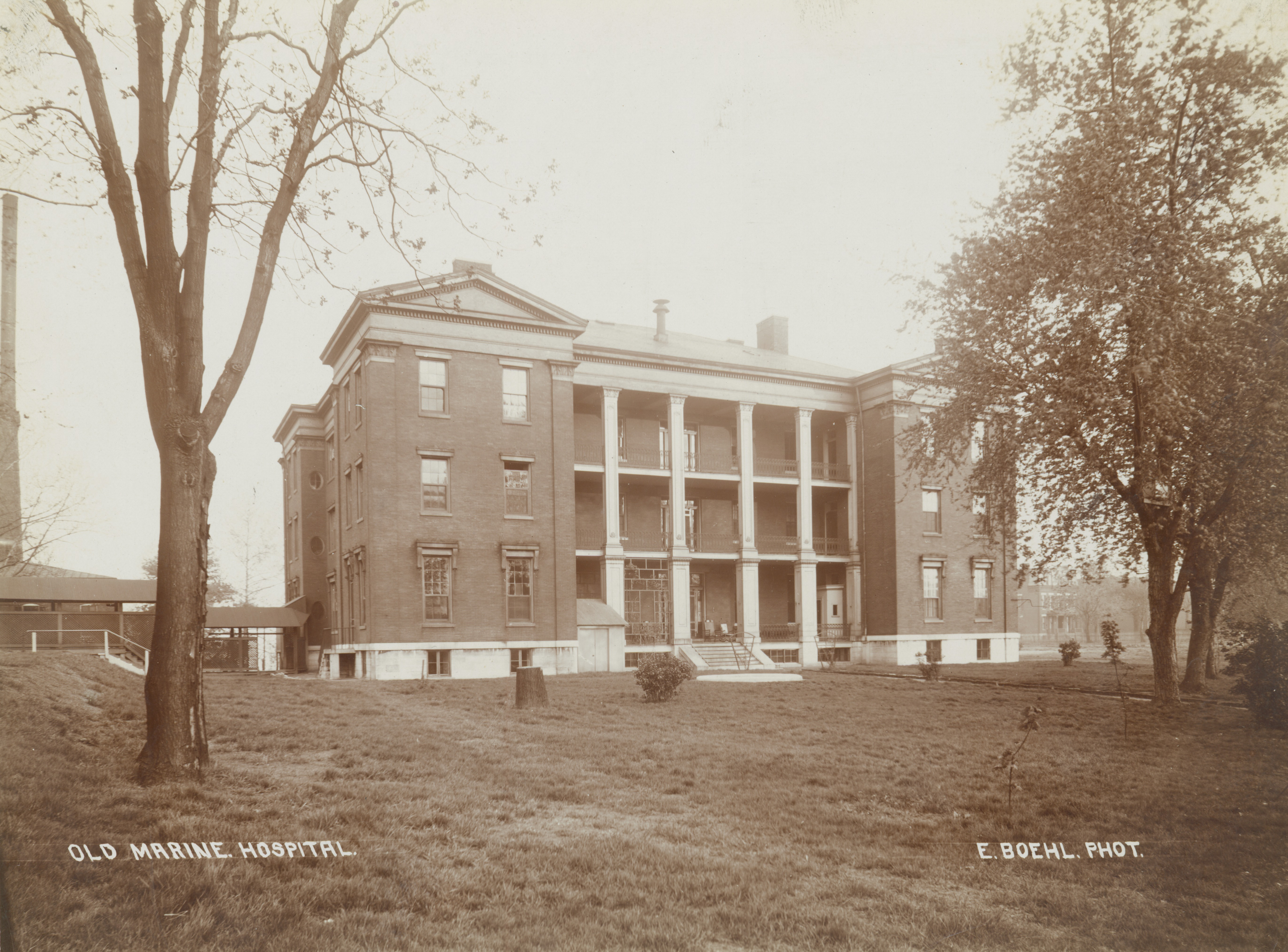
St. Louis hospital, 1858

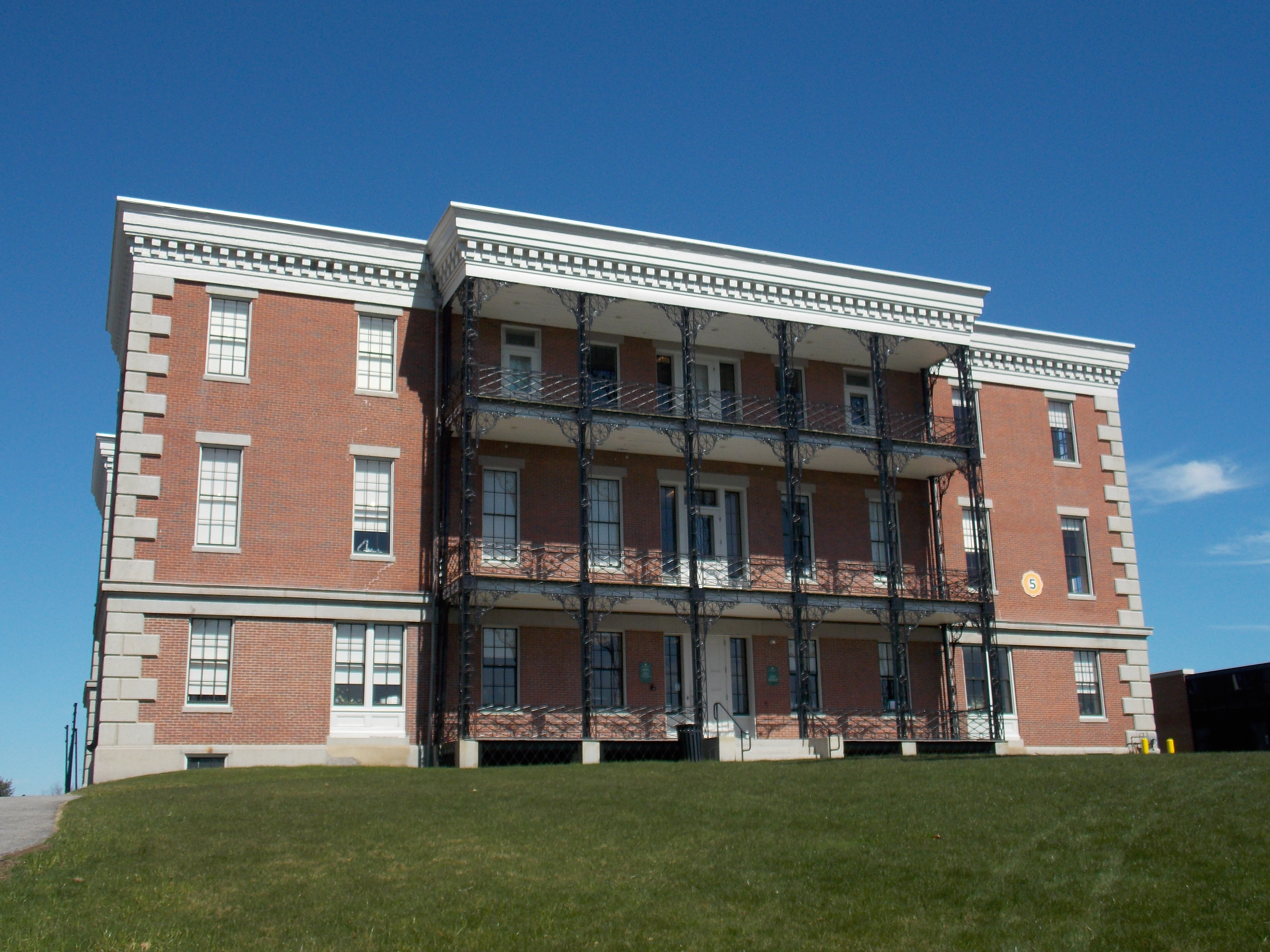
Portland, Maine hospital, 1859*

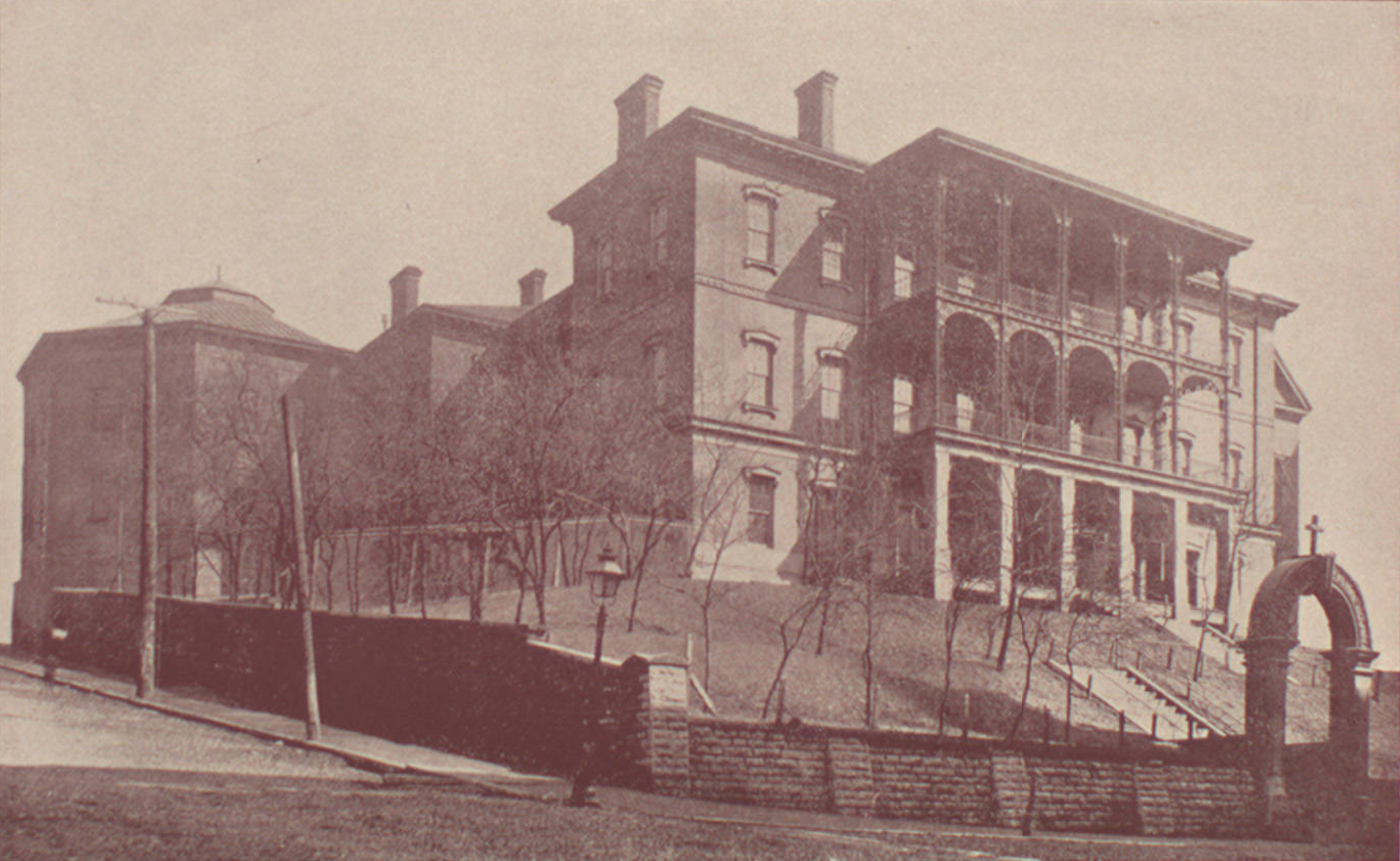
First Cincinnati hospital, 1860

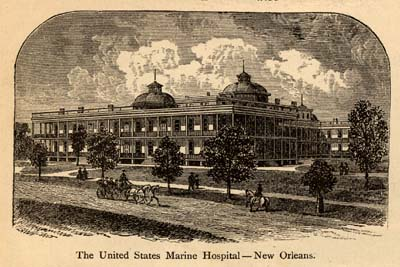
Second New Orleans hospital, never completed, abandoned 1860

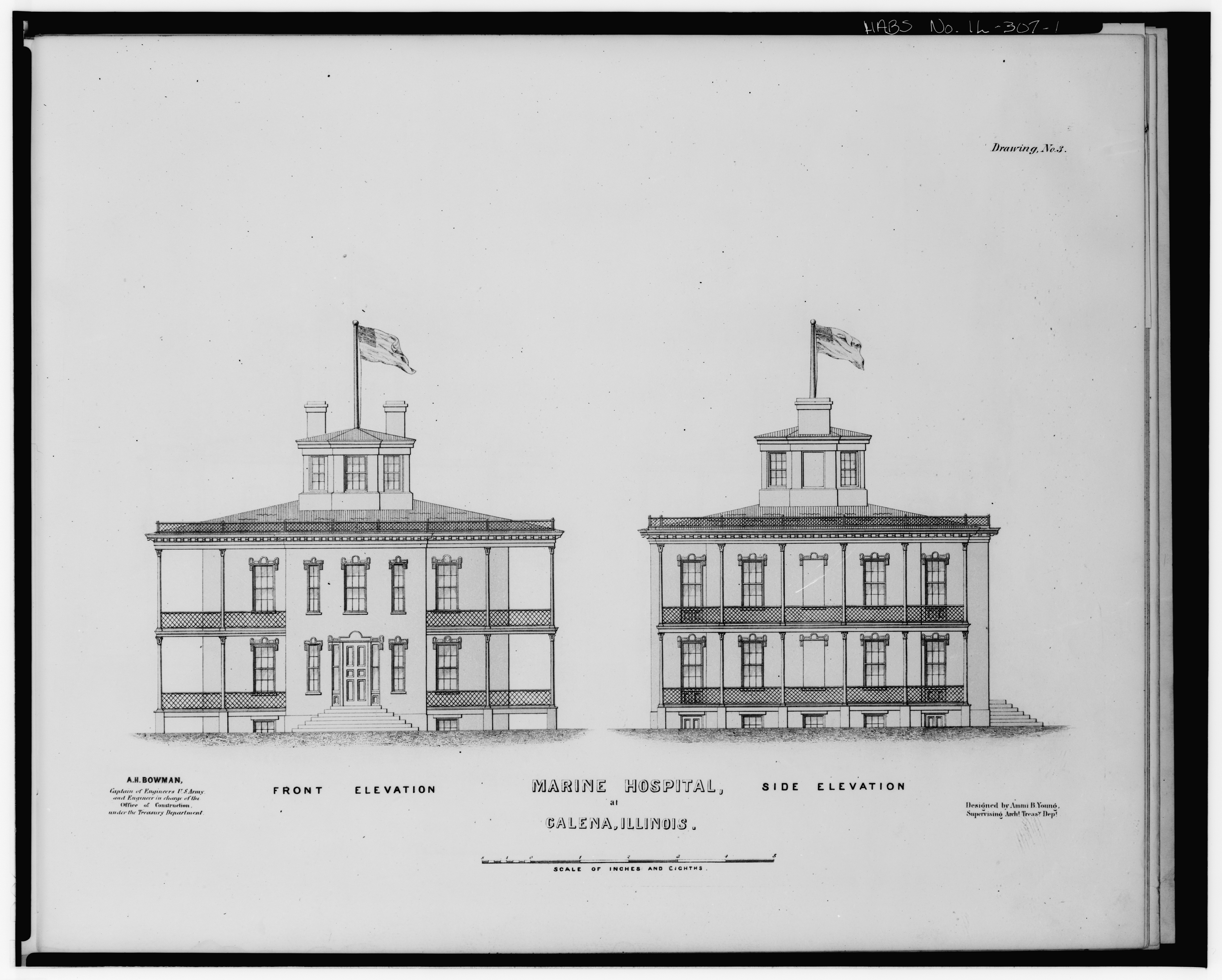
Galena, Illinois hospital, 1861*

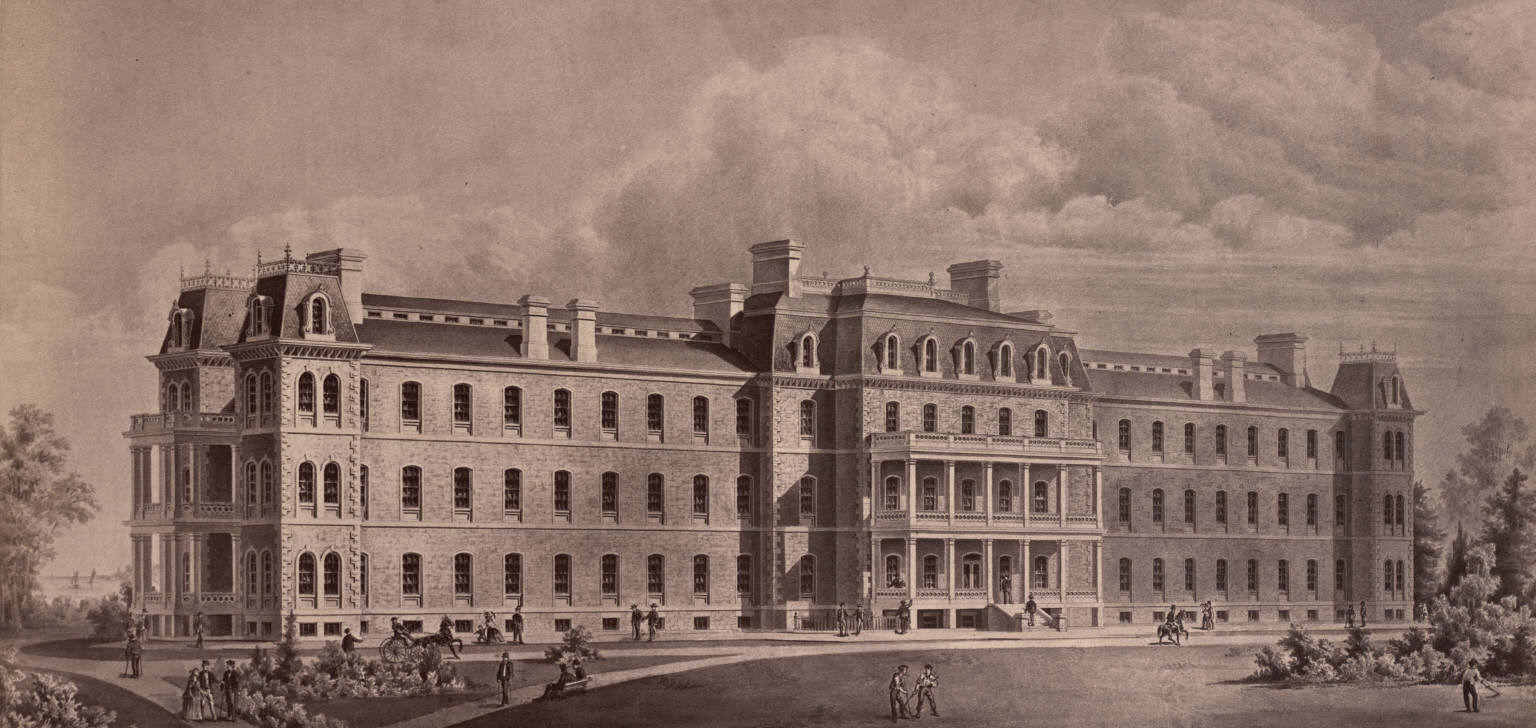
Second Chicago hospital, 1873

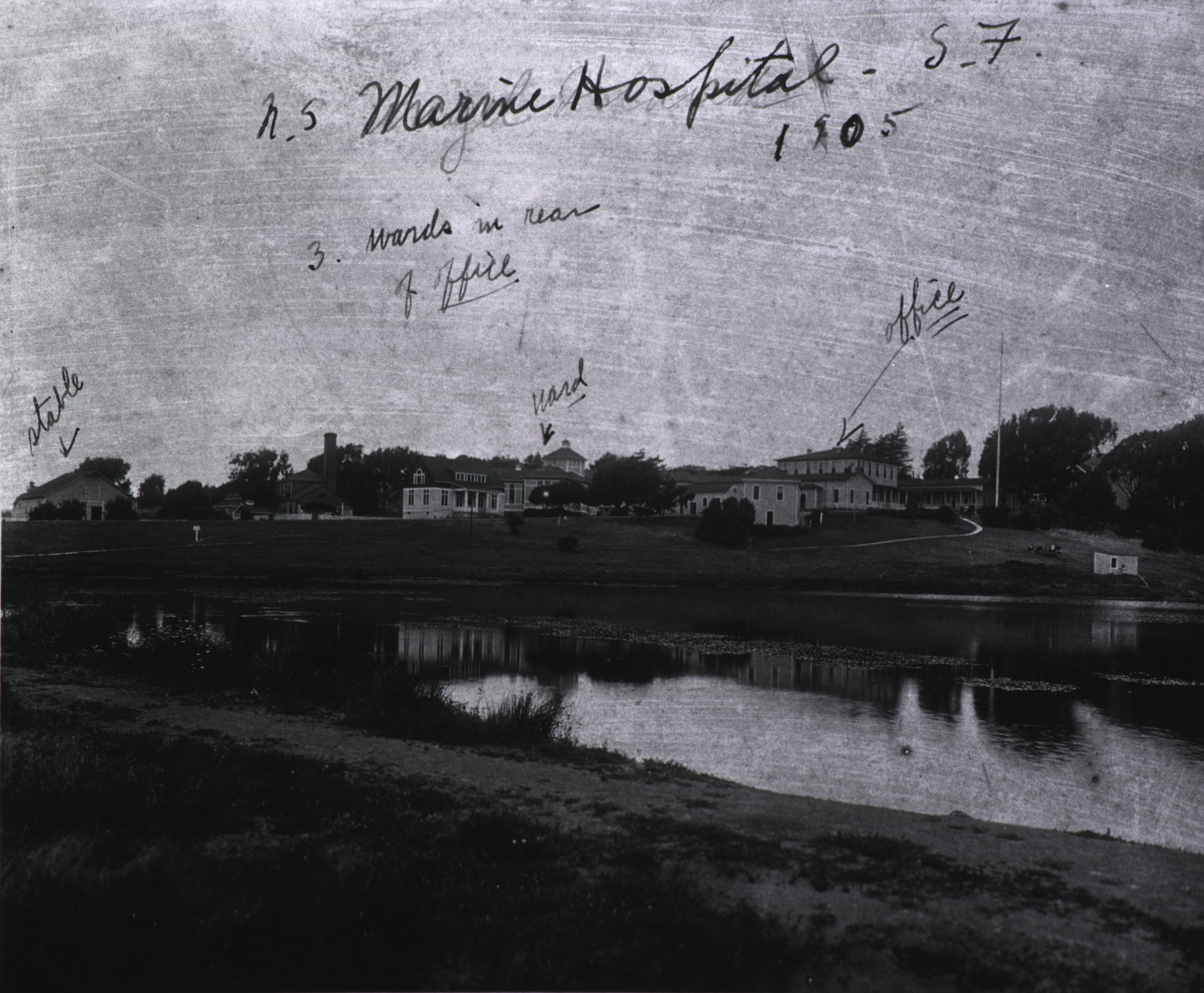
Second San Francisco hospital at the Presidio, 1875

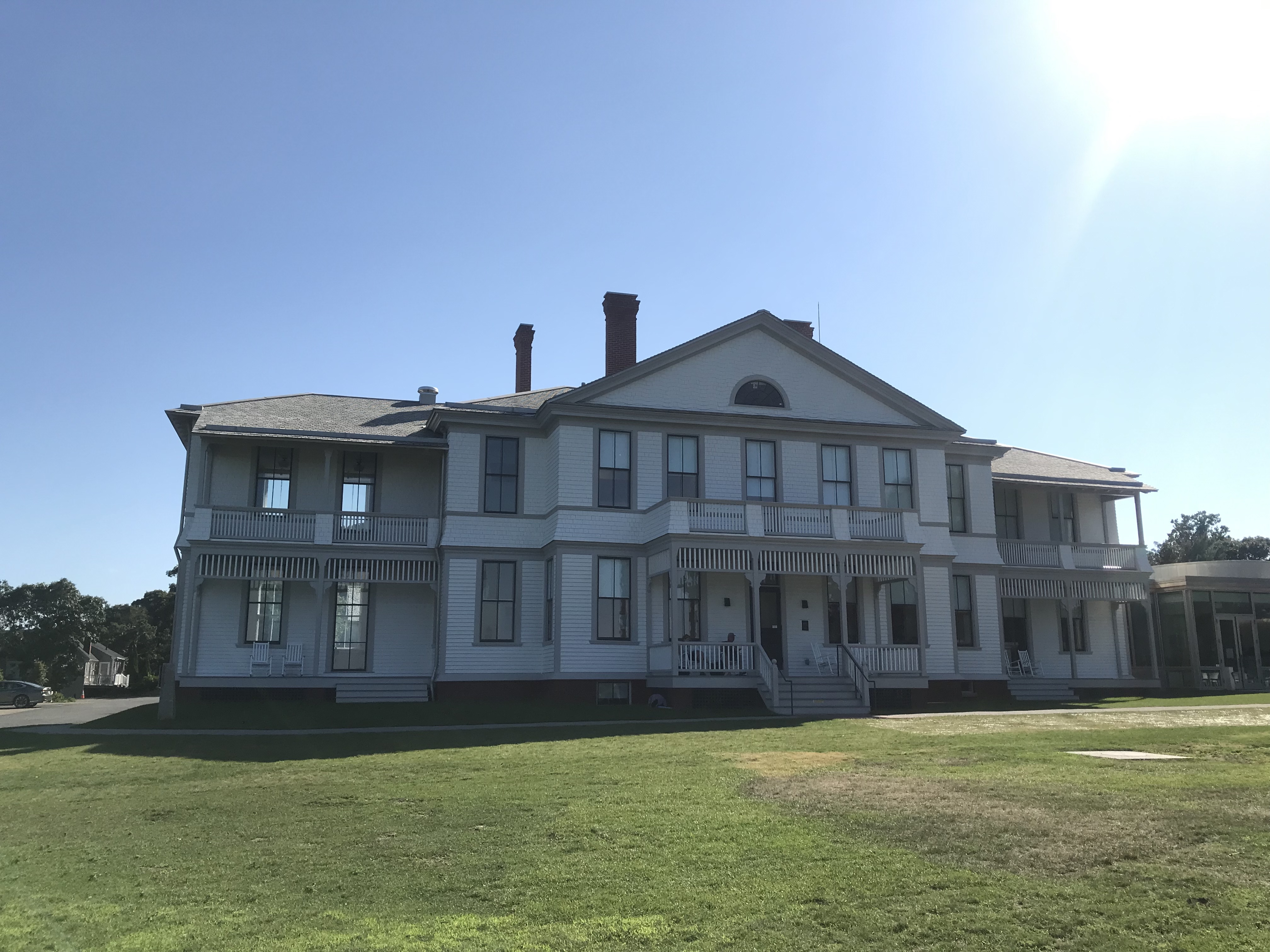
Vineyard Haven, Massachusetts hospital, 1879*

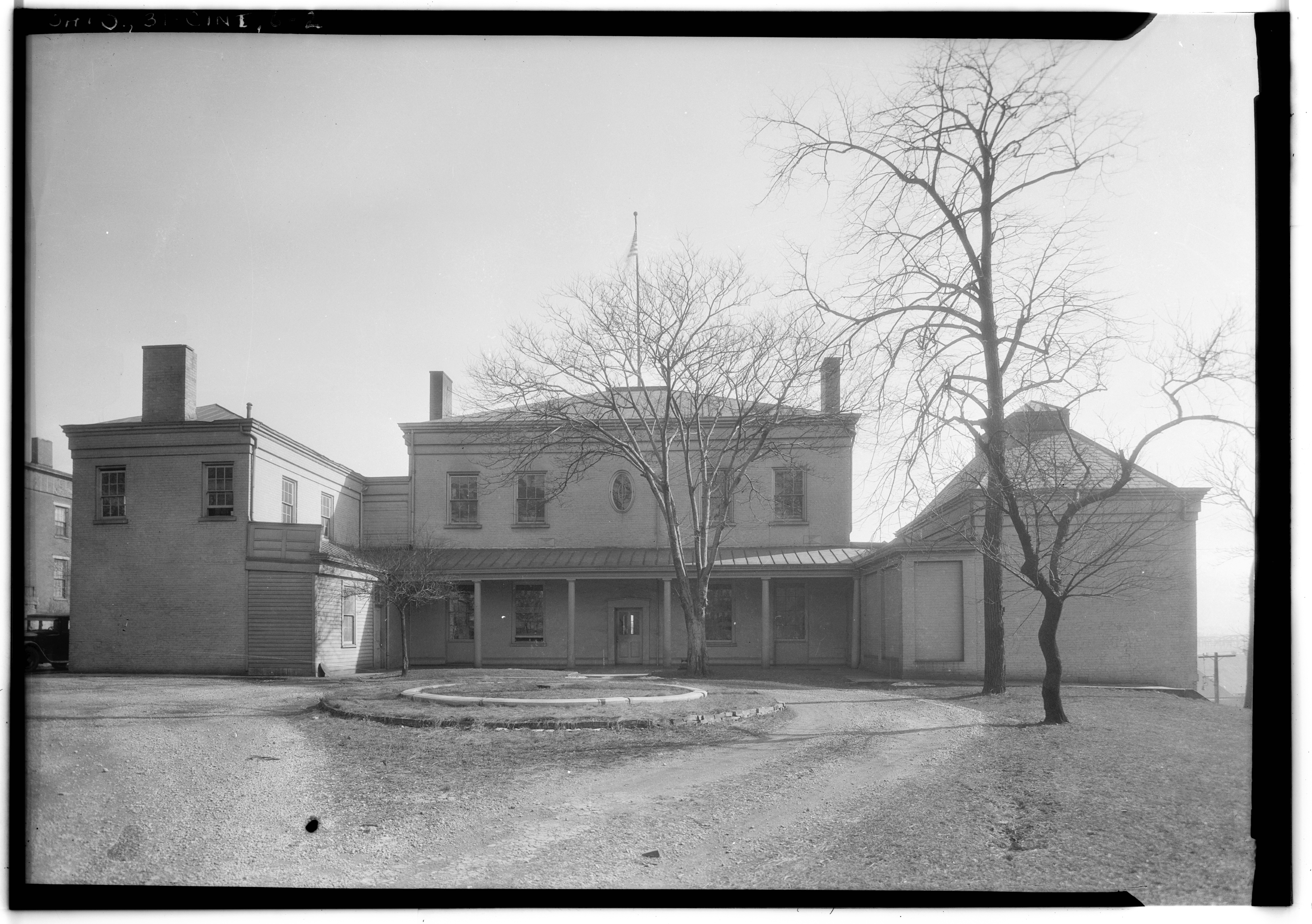
Second Cincinnati hospital in the former Kilgour Mansion, 1882

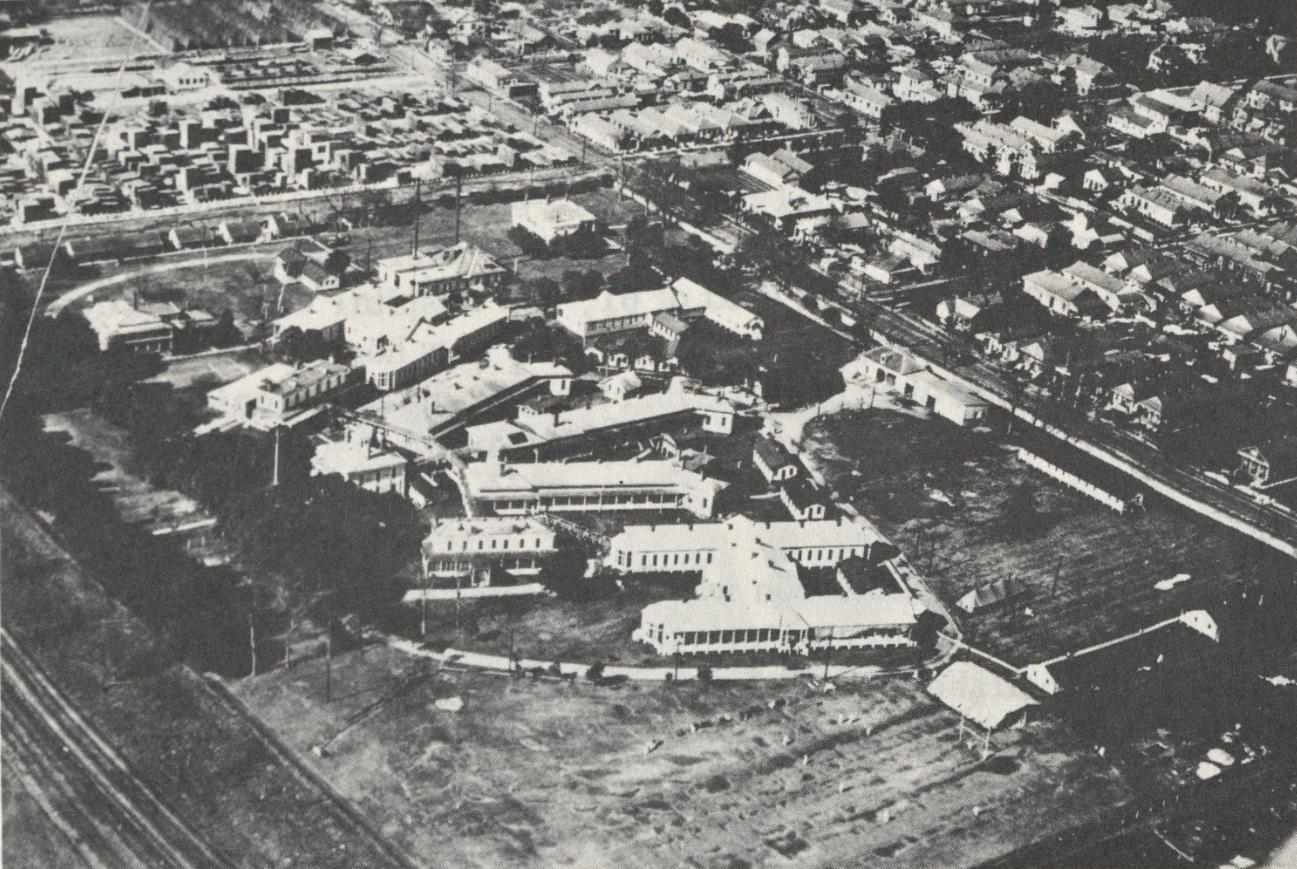
Third New Orleans hospital, 1883

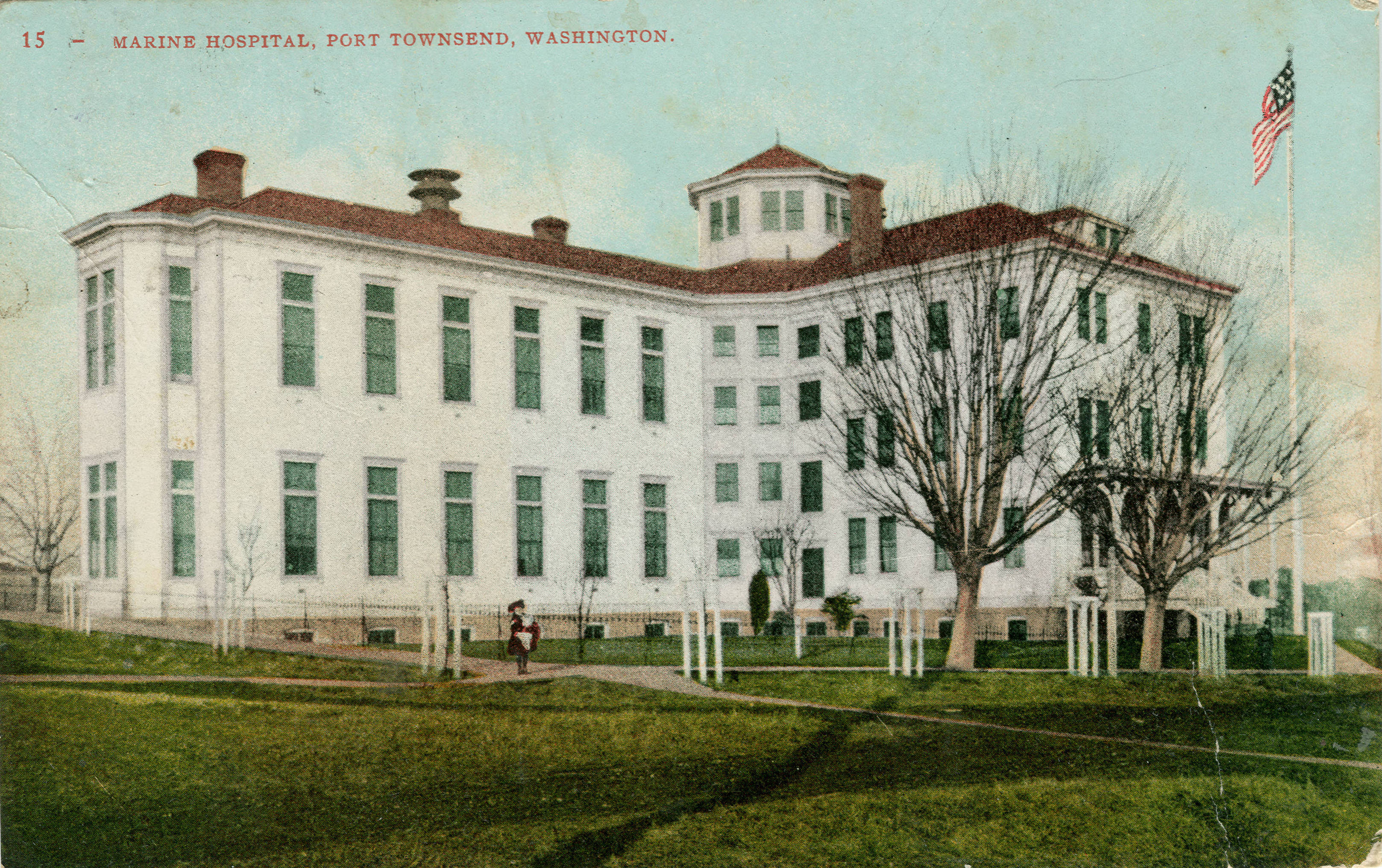
Port Townsend, Washington hospital, 1883

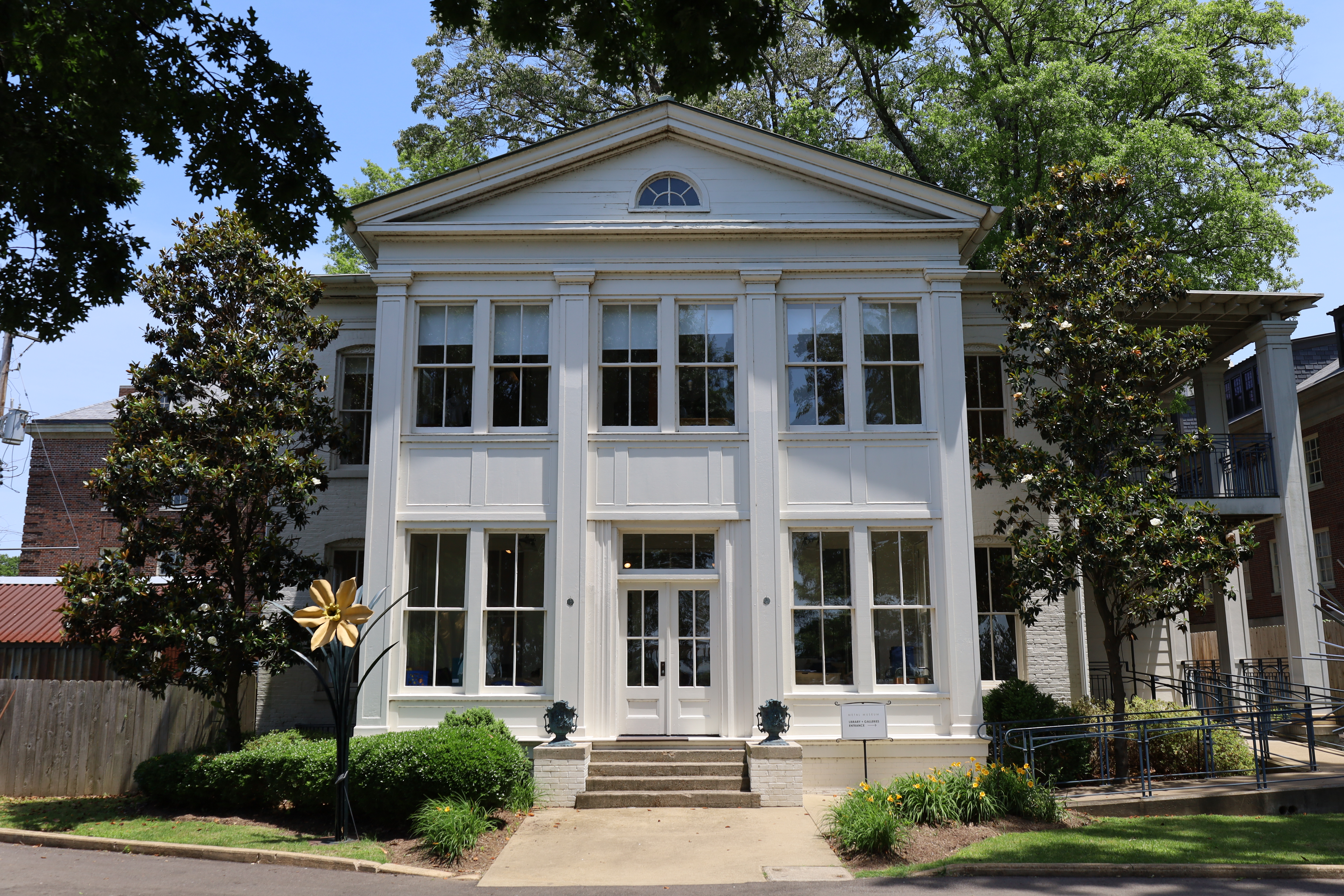
Memphis, Tennessee hospital, 1884*

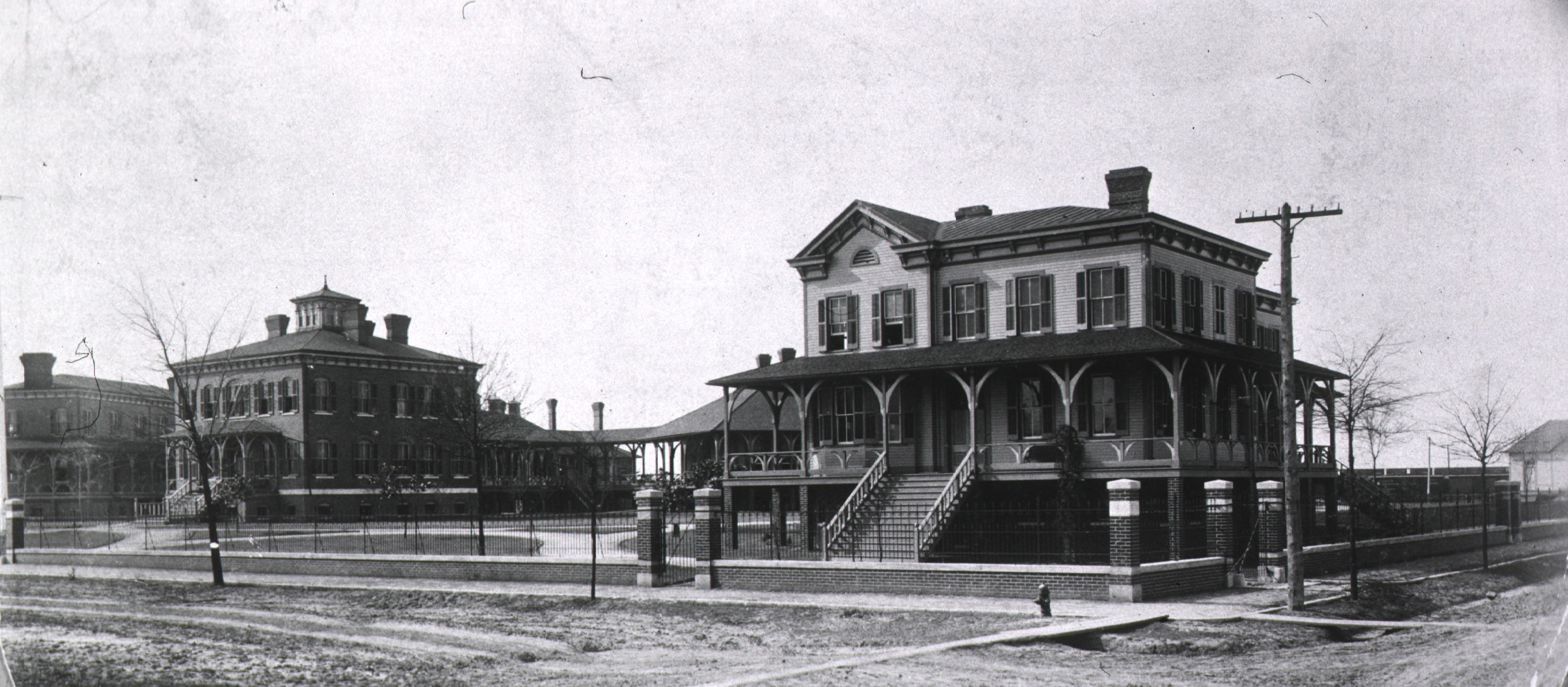
Cairo, Illinois hospital, 1886

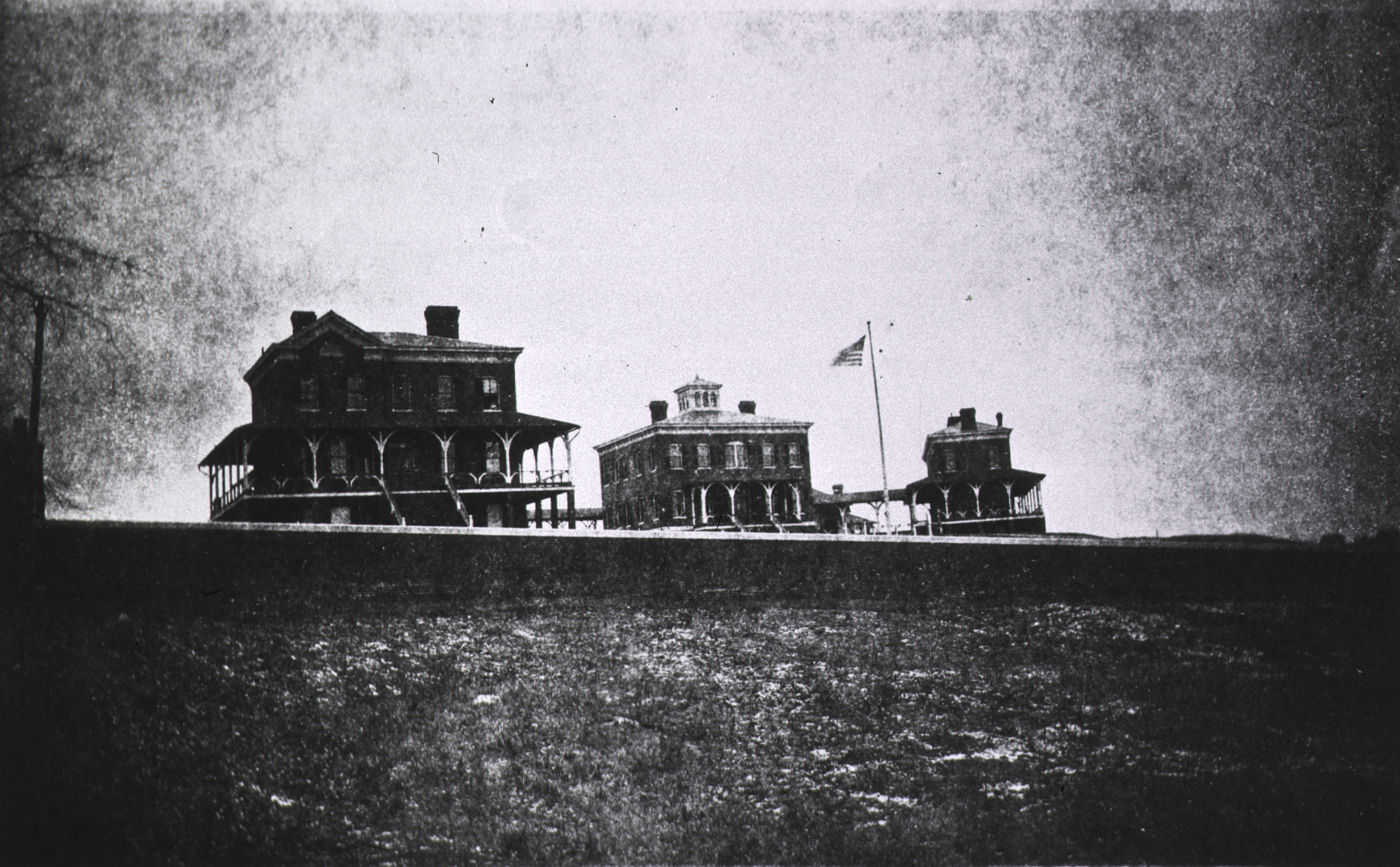
Evansville, Indiana hospital, 1892

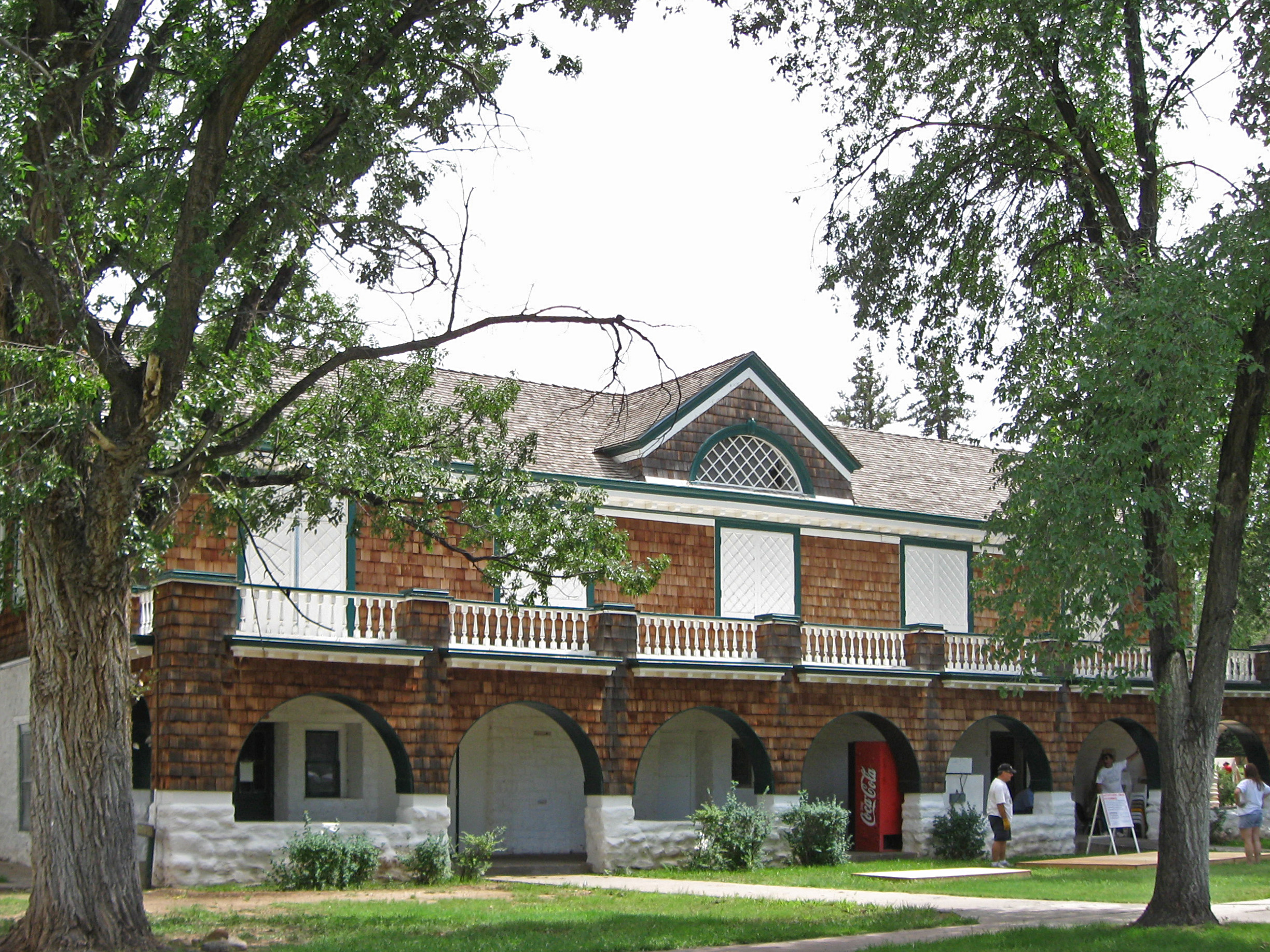
Tuberculosis sanatorium at Fort Stanton, New Mexico, 1898*

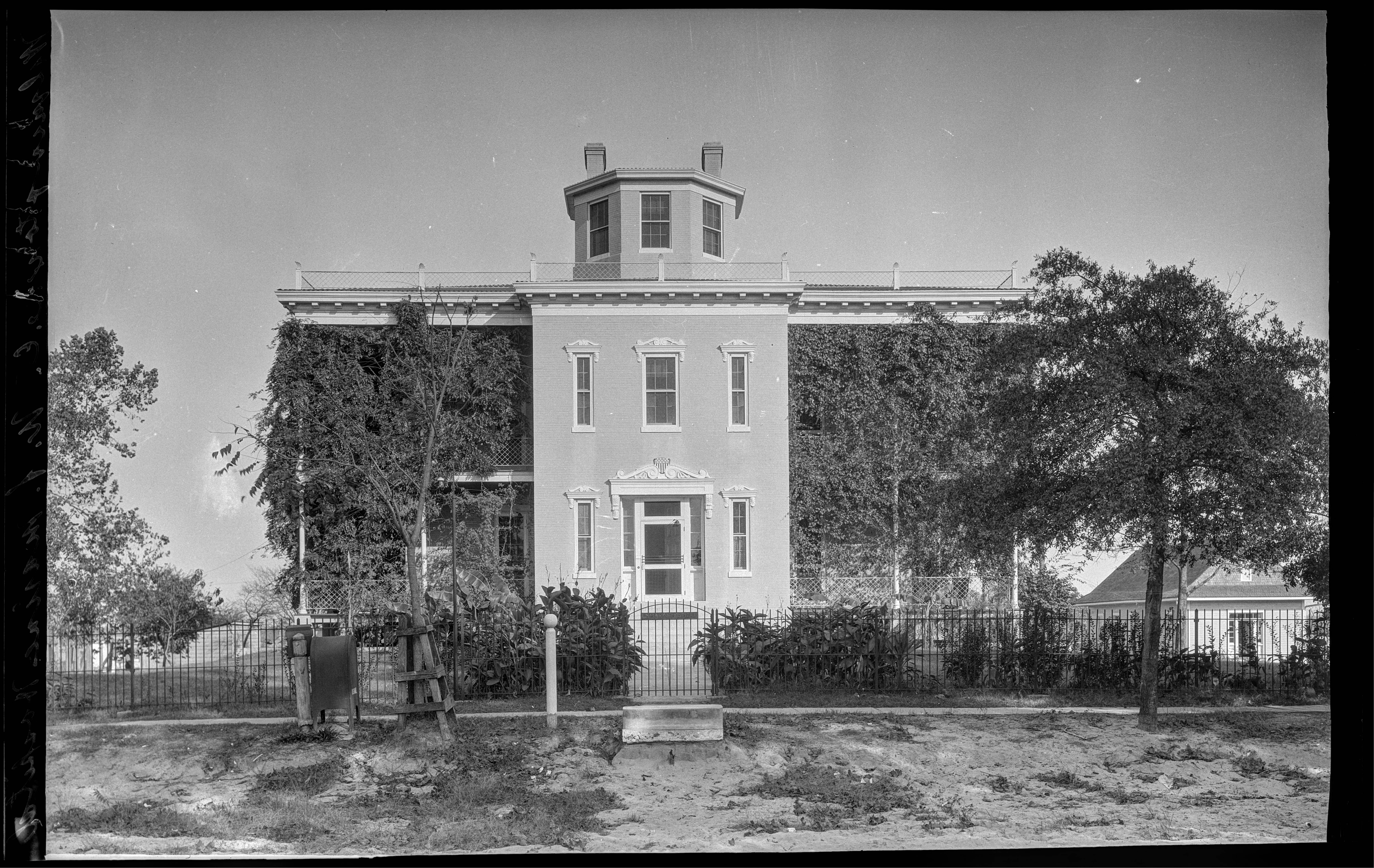
Second Wilmington, North Carolina hospital, 1898

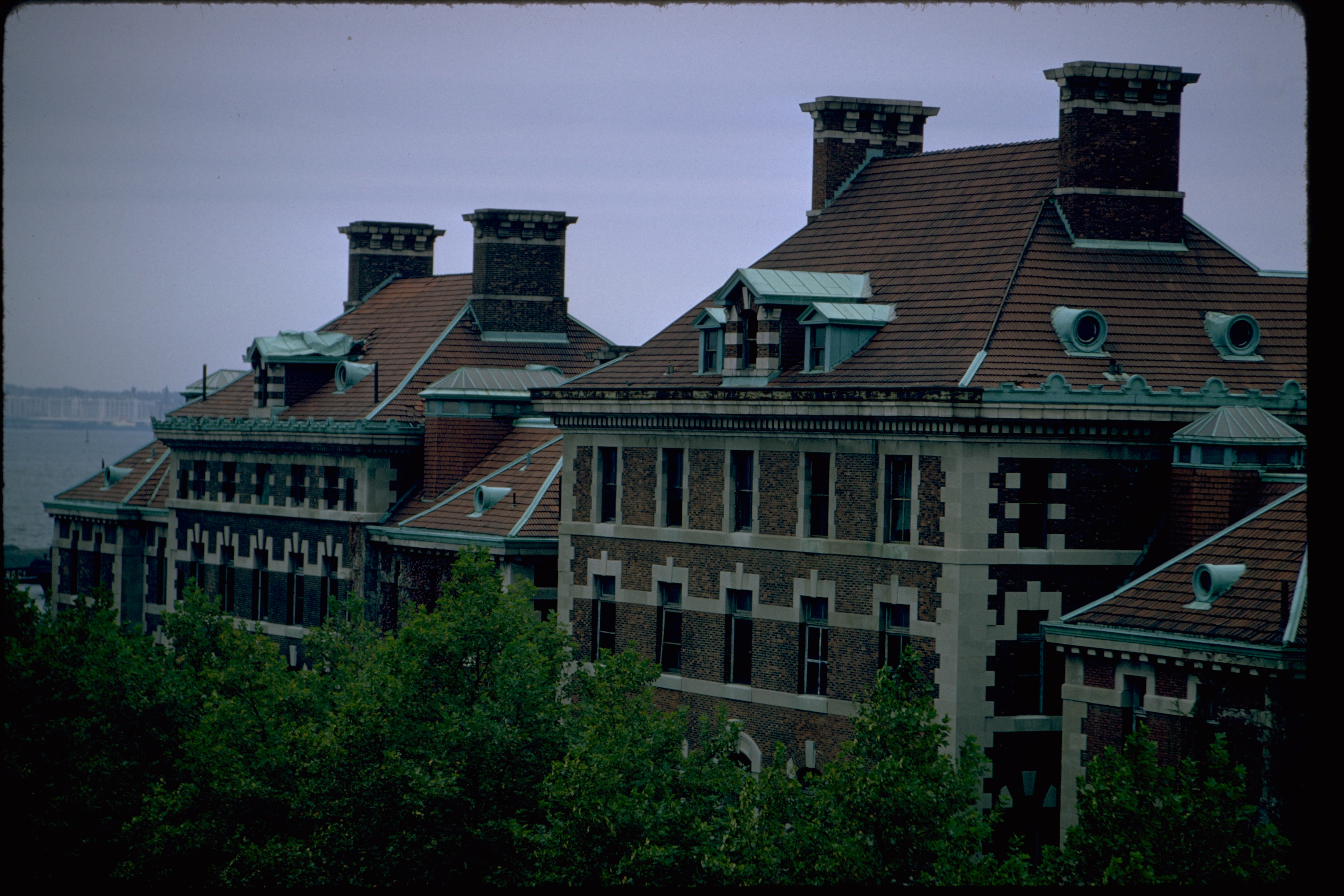
Ellis Island Immigrant Hospital, 1902*

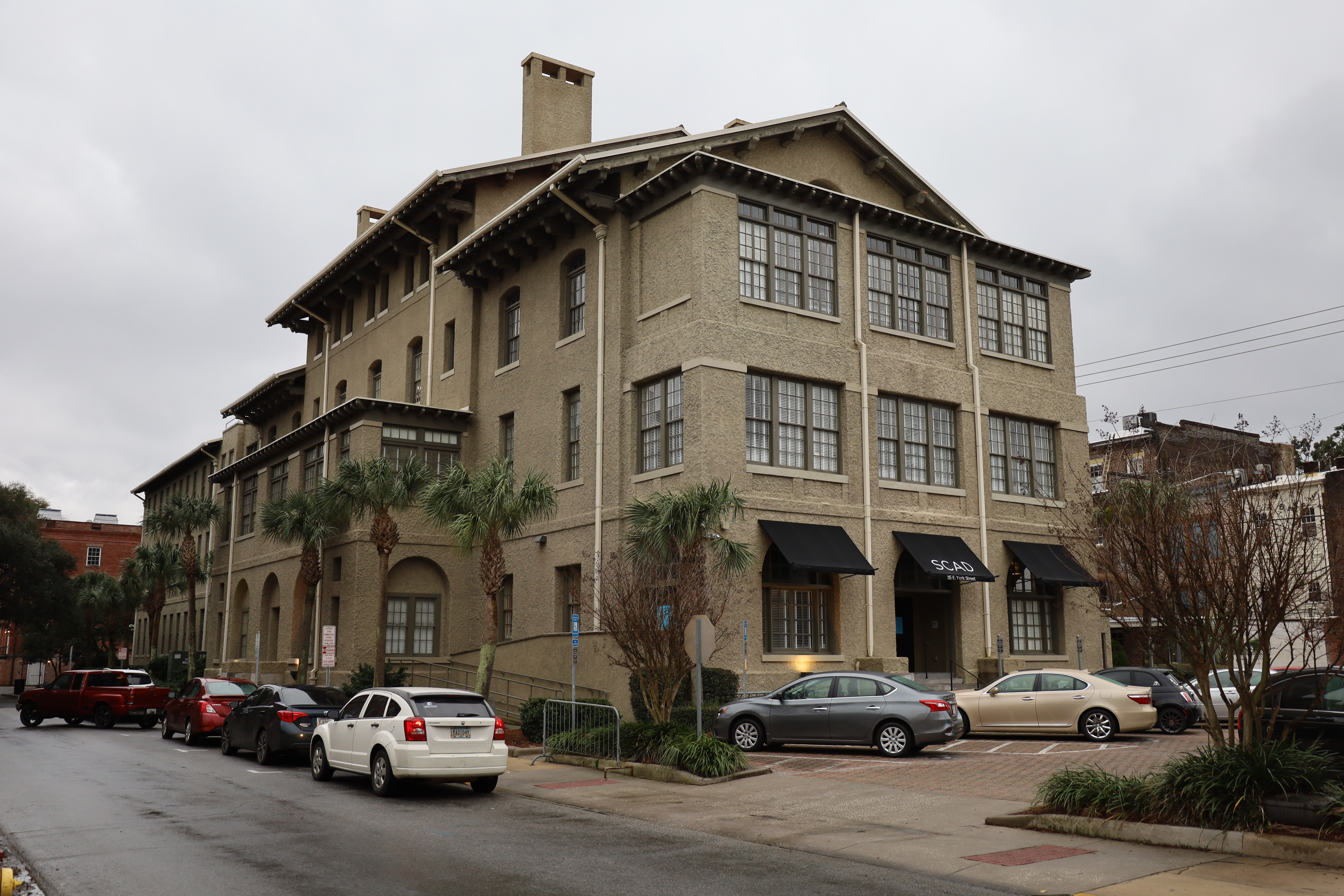
Savannah, Georgia hospital, 1906*

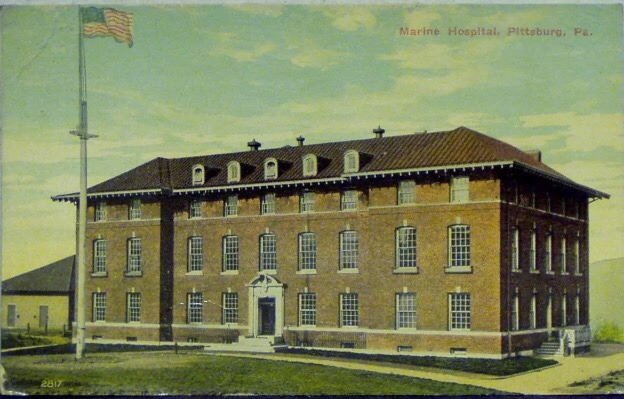
Second Pittsburgh hospital, 1909*

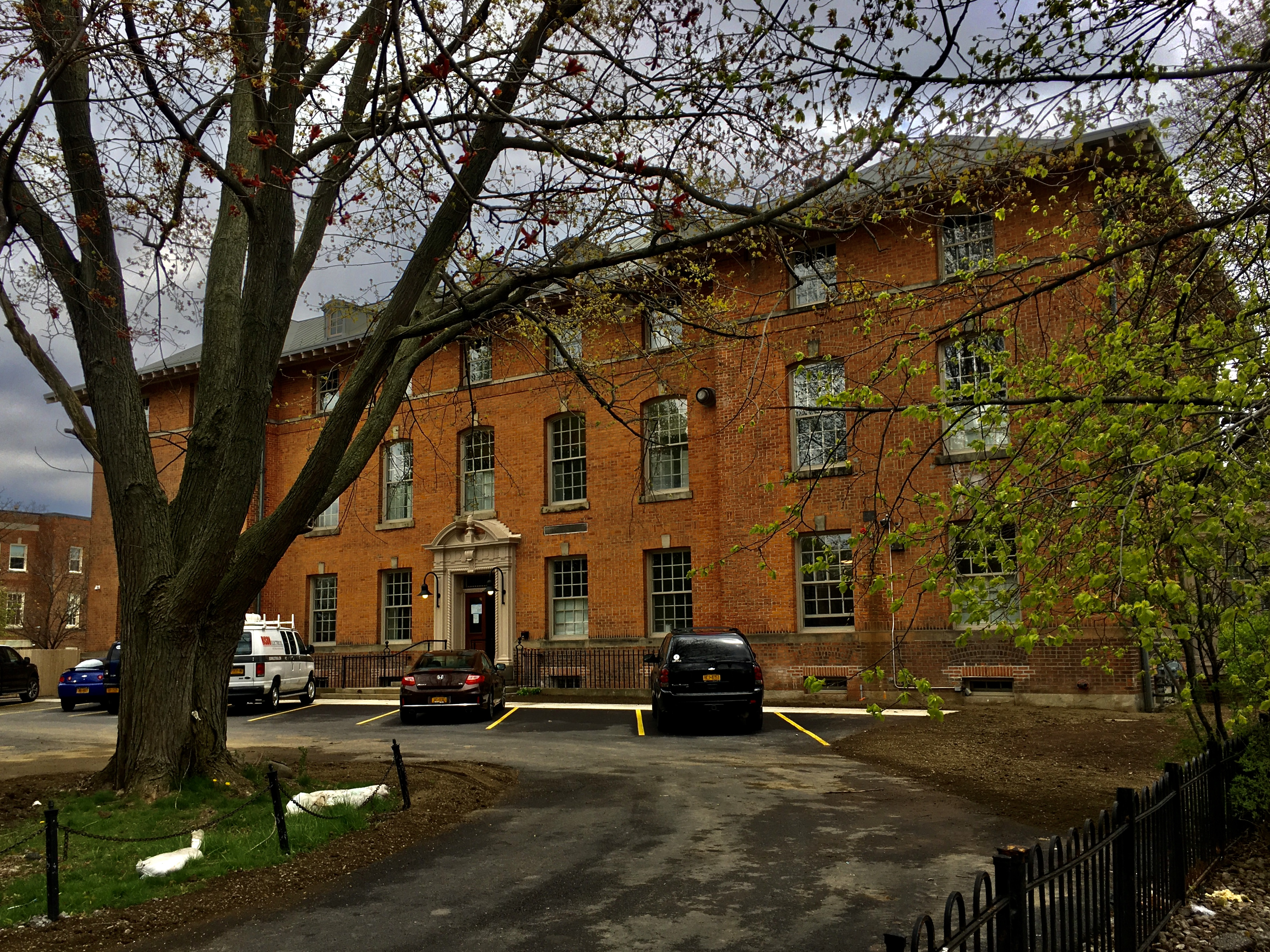
Buffalo, New York hospital, 1909*

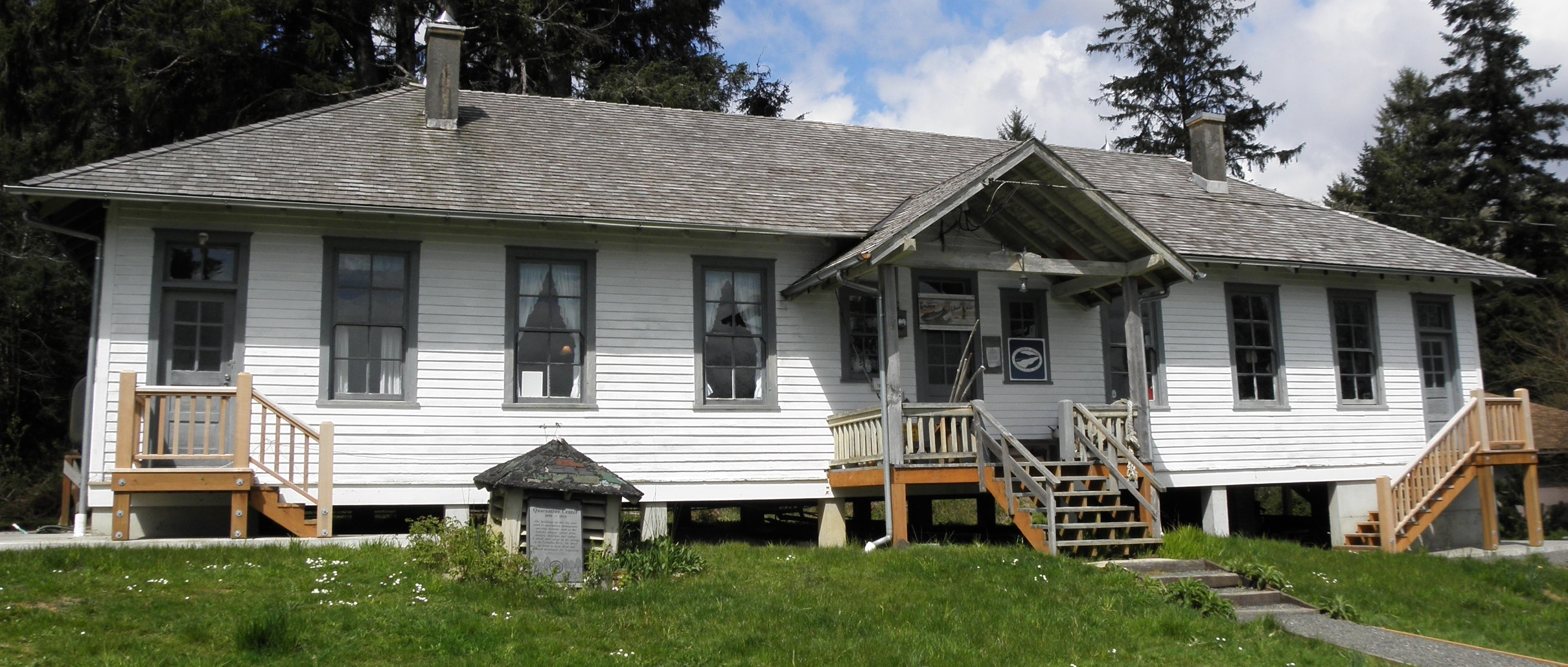
Lazaretto (pesthouse) for the Columbia River Quarantine Station, Knappton Cove, Washington, built 1912

== See also ==
- Timeline of the United States Public Health Service Commissioned Corps
- United States Public Health Service
