= Public Health Act of 1879 =

United States federal statute for public health

- Other short titles: Bureau of Public Health Act, 1879
- Long title: An Act to prevent the introduction of infectious or contagious diseases into the United States, and to establish a National Board of Health.
- Nicknames: National Board of Health Act, 1879
- Enacted by: the 45th United States Congress
- Effective: March 3, 1879

Citations
- Public law: Pub. L. 45–202
- Statutes at Large: 20 Stat. 484

Legislative history
- Introduced in the Senate as S. 1784; Passed the Senate on February 24, 1879 (45-14); Passed the House on March 3, 1879 (170-63, in lieu of H.R. 6500); Signed into law by President Rutherford B. Hayes on March 3, 1879

Public Health Act of 1879 or National Board of Health Act, 1879 was a United States federal statute authorizing the creation of the National Board of Health. The Act of Congress was an appeal for a national public health organization and national quarantine system for purposes of contagious or infectious diseases discovered in nineteenth century America. The United States public law sanctioned the newly formed National Health Board and Academy of Sciences to provide reports concerning public health information with regards to the Perpetual Union or States for the purposes of;

☆ Isolation or quarantine of contagious diseases or disease outbreaks
☆ Hygiene and sanitation for domiciles or States administrative divisions as related to inland and maritime provinces

== Provisions of the Act ==
The forty-fifth United States Congress authored the public law as four sections sanctioning the needs for conformity concerning public health incidences, uniformity of incident reports, and a national public health organization.

Sec. 1 - Creation of National Board of Health

Consist of seven members

Appointed by the President
Advice and consent of the Senate
Not more than one of whom shall be appointed from any one State

Compensation of civilian members

Ten dollars per diem

Meetings

Meet in Washington within thirty days after the passage of this Act
Meet for special examinations and investigations at any place or places within the United States, or at foreign ports
Meet as deemed best, to aid in the execution of this Act and the promotion of its objectives

Sec. 2 - Duties

Obtain information upon all matters affecting the public health of the States
Advise several departments of the government, executives of several States, and Commissioners of the District of Columbia
Opinion of the board and advice to the preservation and improvement of public health for the States

Sec. 3 - Report

National Board of Health and Academy of Science to report directly to Congress at its next session

Full Report concerning statement of transactions and plan for a national public health organization
Plan shall be prepared after consultation with principal sanitary organizations and sanitarians of States or United States
Plan shall have special attention to the subject of quarantine, both maritime and inland
Plan for State or local systems of quarantine and a national quarantine system

Sec. 4 - Appropriation

Appropriation of fifty thousand dollars for the purposes of this Act

Salaries and expenses for National Board of Health
Appropriation to carry out this Act

== Associated United States Statutes ==
Public Health Acts for Epidemic Diseases

Date of Enactment	Public Law No.	U.S. Statute	U.S. Bill No.	U.S. Presidential Administration
April 18, 1879	P.L. 46-1	21 Stat. 1	S. 55	Rutherford B. Hayes
June 2, 1879	P.L. 46-11	21 Stat. 5	S. 108	Rutherford B. Hayes
July 1, 1879	P.L. 46-61	21 Stat. 46	S. 675	Rutherford B. Hayes

== United States quarantine stations of 1888 ==
In 1888, the 50th United States Congress passed legislation to enhance and improve the quarantine service at ports of entry. Eight quarantine stations for the United States coast to coast territorial waters were established.

- Cape Charles, Virginia
- Port Townsend, Washington
- Delaware Breakwater
- San Diego Harbor, California
- Gulf of Mexico, formerly Ship Island, Mississippi
- San Francisco, California
- Key West, Florida
- Sapelo Sound, South Atlantic

== See also ==
- Asymptomatic carrier
- Emerging infectious disease
- Marine Hospital Service
- Occupational hygiene
- Passenger Act of 1882
- Public Health Reports
- Self-supply of water and sanitation
- Water supply and sanitation in the United States
- Waterborne diseases
- Yellow Fever Commission

Trans-Atlantic and Trans-Pacific Infectious Diseases

Cholera	Tuberculosis
Scarlet fever	Typhoid fever
Smallpox	Yellow fever

== Bibliography ==
- National Quarantine and Sanitary Association of the United States (1860). "Quarantine Regulations". HathiTrust Digital Library. George Rand & Avery. OCLC 14846965.
- Winslow, Charles-Edward Amory (1911). "Industrial Hygiene". HathiTrust Digital Library. Boston, Massachusetts: Health Education League. OCLC 34229853.
- Winslow, Charles-Edward Amory (January 9, 1920). "The Untilled Fields of Public Health". Science. 51 (1306): 23–33. Bibcode:1920Sci....51...23W. doi:10.1126/science.51.1306.23. JSTOR 1645011. PMID 17838891.
- The Future of Public Health. Washington, D.C.: National Academies Press. 1988. pp. 56–72. ISBN 978-0309581905. OCLC 639896452.
