= National Board of Health =

Short lived institution that operated from 1879 to 1883 in the United States

The National Board of Health (NBH) was a short lived institution that operated from 1879 to 1883 in the United States. It was created during the third Session of the 45th Congress, listed as chapter 202 better known as the Public Health Act of 1879. The purpose of the NBH was to carry out a piece of legislation passed in Session I of the 45th Congress, Chapter 66. Chapter 66 and Chapter 202 were redundant pieces of legislature in all aspects but one: the implementation and oversight of the NBH.

The NBH was created during a period of emergency and had substantial powers (such as the ability to mandate quarantine). As the subsequent years were relatively pandemic-free, Republican members of Congress, as well as conservative lawmakers, chose not to reauthorize the NBH in 1883.

== Purpose ==
The ambition of these two Bills, and by extension the NBH, were to stop the "introduction of contagious or infectious diseases into the United States". The legislation ordered for a medical officer from the Army, Navy, Marine Hospital Service to oversee the medical aspects of the organization. In addition, an officer from the Justice Department was to be appointed to deal with state and national laws regarding quarantine. In the passage of this Bill, the NBH was to effectively strip the powers of quarantine from the Marine Hospital Service, a precursor to the National Health Service which itself would become the CDC. The delegation of the power of quarantine from the Marine Hospital Service was to be renewed after a period of 4 years. Congress would have to reenact the bill if the NBH were to continue to have quarantine powers.

== Reception ==
The NBH was met with immediate criticism, as many states believed that it was restrictive of trade. This came at a time following the Civil War when states' rights, particularly ones revolving around economy and commerce, were a sensitive topic. This, combined with internal politics led to the demise of the NBH.

== Legacy ==
Although attempts during this period to established a national health organization failed, the idea of it remained. The NBH's legacy would see to the creation of a number of different government programs with the same overarching goals. This progression would eventually lead to the creation of the CDC following the second World War.
