= Timeline of the United States Public Health Service Commissioned Corps =

This is a timeline of the United States Public Health Service Commissioned Corps and its predecessor, the Marine Hospital Service.

== Timeline ==
=== 1798 ===
The Congressional Act of 1798 was signed into law by President John Adams. It created a tax of 20 cents each month to be withheld from seamen's wages for support of marine hospitals. The money was paid to the U.S. Collector of Customs. This was the first example of pre-paid health insurance in U.S. history. The Act was expanded in 1799 to include all "officers, seamen and marines of the navy of the United States"

=== 1801 ===
In 1801, the first marine hospital owned by the Federal government was located at Washington Point in Virginia. Other early marine hospitals were established in the port cities of Boston, Massachusetts; Newport, Rhode Island; New Orleans, Louisiana; Mobile, Alabama; and Charleston, South Carolina.

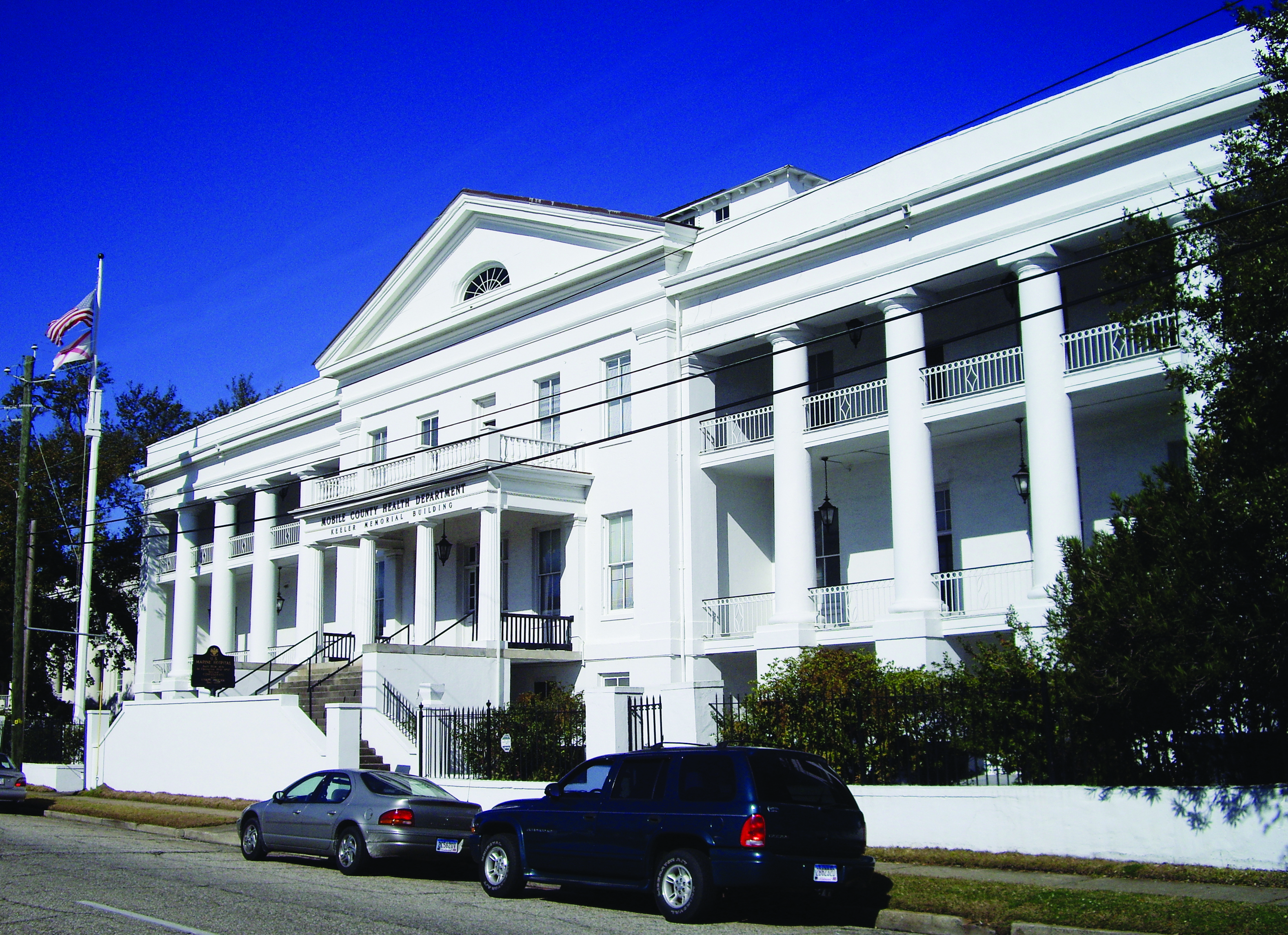
U.S. Marine Hospital, 800 St. Anthony Street, Mobile, Alabama. Built 1838-39.

=== 1803 ===
The first permanent Marine hospital was authorized to be built in Boston, Massachusetts.

=== 1836 ===
Kentucky Senator Henry Clay sponsored legislation for the U.S. Marine Hospital to be built in Louisville, "for the sick seamen, boatmen, and other navigators on the western rivers and lakes."

=== 1870 ===
This practice continued until 1870, excepting one year from April 1837 to 1838. A bill was enacted to centralize and reorganize the Marine Hospital Service, with its headquarters in Washington, DC, under the position of supervising surgeon. This act also raised the hospital tax from 20 cents to 40 cents until 1884.

=== 1871 ===
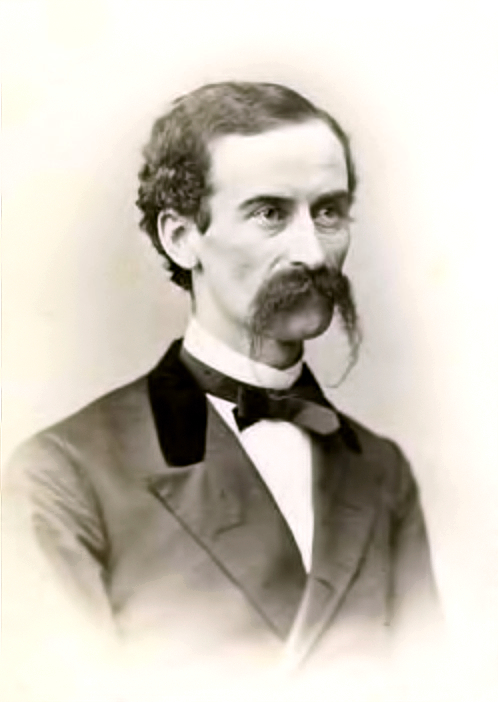
John Maynard Woodworth

John Maynard Woodworth, the first supervising surgeon, adopted a military model for his medical staff as part of system reform. Woodworth instituted examinations for applicants and implemented required uniforms for physicians. He created a cadre of mobile, career-service physicians assigned to various marine hospitals.

=== 1878 ===
The prevalence of major epidemic diseases such as smallpox and yellow fever across the globe spurred Congress to enact the National Quarantine Act to prevent the introduction and spread of contagious and infectious disease in the United States. The task of controlling epidemic diseases through quarantine and disinfection measures, as well as immunization programs, within the country fell to the Marine Hospital Service, such as these Public Health Service officers in uniform as the Montauk Point, New York Quarantine Station.

=== 1879 ===
The National Board of Health was created by the 15th U.S. Congress through an act that was titled, "An Act to prevent the Introduction of Infectious or Contagious Disease in the United States and to Establish a National Board of Health." The board had 11 members 7 of which were appointed by the president, 3 were medical officers from the Navy, Marine Hospital Service and the Army, and the last member was a representative from the office of the Attorney General. The National Board of Health was responsible for conserving and improve public health. This was the first Federally organized effort for comprehensive medical research. They were also given the power to quarantine.

=== 1887 ===
A one-room bacteriological laboratory was created within the Marine Hospital Service in Staten Island, New York by Dr. Joseph Kinyoun. It was known as the Laboratory of Hygiene. It was established to conduct research on cholera and several other infectious diseases. It was later redesignated as the National Institute of Health [sic] in 1930.

=== 1889 ===
An Act of Congress established the United States Public Health Service Commissioned Corps and formalized the Commissioned Corps as the uniformed services component of the Marine Hospital Service. Congress organized Corps officers along military lines with titles and pay corresponding to Army and Navy grades.

=== 1890 ===
The Marine Hospital Service was given interstate quarantine powers by Congress. This was done as an effort to control the spread of epidemic diseases.

=== 1902 ===
The Marine Hospital Service expanded to the Public Health and Marine Hospital Service to reflect growing responsibilities. Officers continued to carry out quarantine duties, which now included the medical inspection of arriving immigrants, such as those landing at Ellis Island in New York. Public Health and Marine Hospital Service officers played a major role in fulfilling the commitment to prevent disease from entering the country.

=== 1912 ===
The name of the Public Health and Marine Hospital Service was shortened to the Public Health Service (PHS). Legislation enacted by Congress broadened the powers of the PHS by authorizing investigations into human disease (such as tuberculosis, hookworm, malaria, and leprosy), sanitation, water supplies, and sewage disposal.

=== 1936 ===
Surgeon General Thomas Parran led the fight against venereal disease and paved the way for modern public health organizations. He strengthened and extended the research programs at the National Institutes of Health, established the Communicable Disease Center (later Centers for Disease Control and Prevention), and participated in the planning of the World Health Organization.

=== 1944 ===
The PHS Act of 1944 broadened the scope of the Commissioned Corps, allowing for the commissioning of nurses, scientists, dietitians, physical therapists, and sanitarians (later health service officers). From 1940 to 1945, the Commissioned Corps quadrupled its numbers from 625 officers to 2,600.

=== 1964 ===
Surgeon General Dr. Luther Terry released a landmark report that concluded that lung cancer and chronic bronchitis are causally related to cigarette smoking. The report was the first such analysis that laid out the effects of tobacco and smoking and it spurred initiatives to lower tobacco use among Americans.

=== 1986 ===
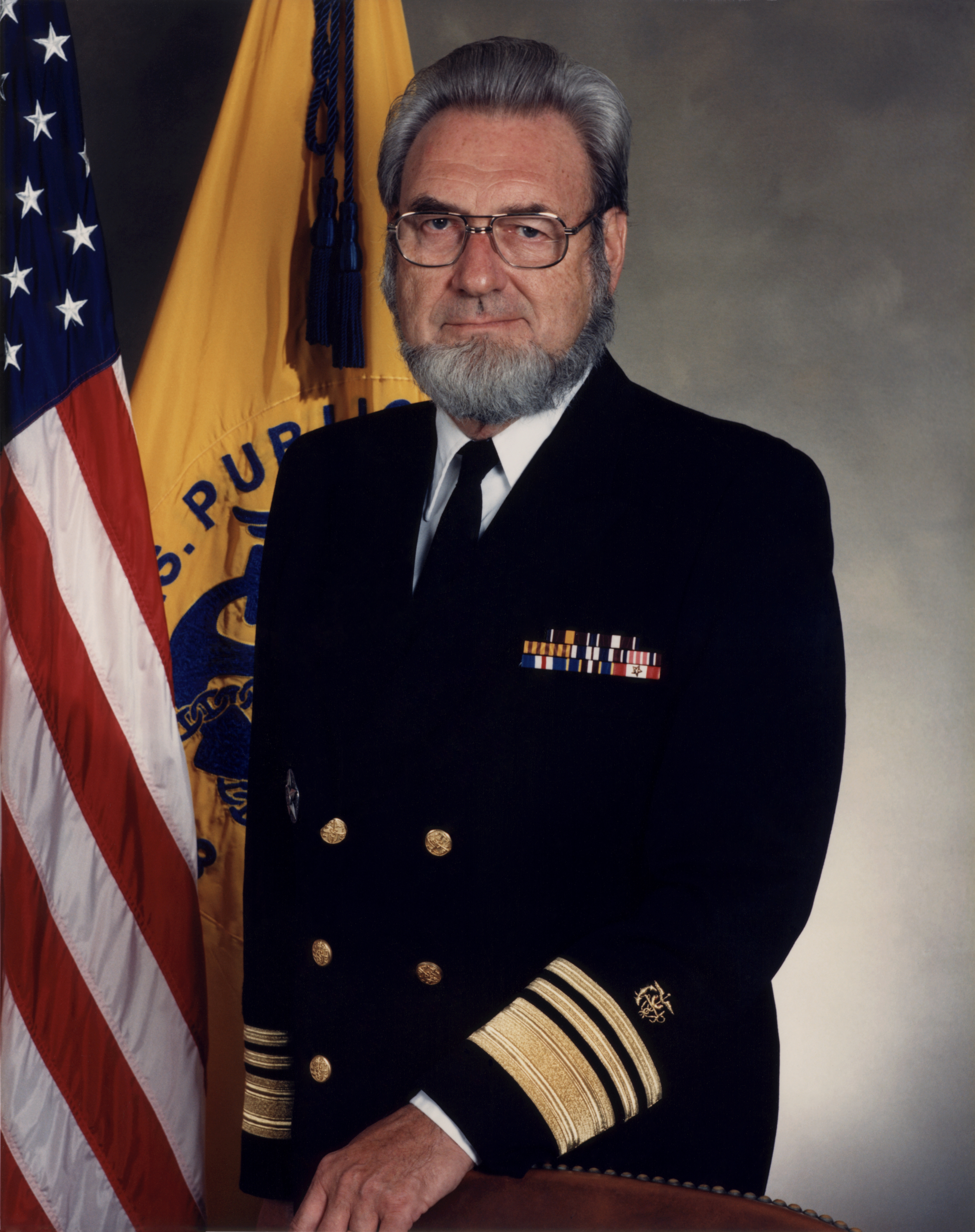
C. Everett Koop

Dr. C. Everett Koop served as Surgeon General as the nation began to recognize AIDS as a new and deadly disease. Koop became the chief Federal spokesperson on AIDS and released a report on AIDS that contributed significantly to providing information on the disease. Koop also wrote Understanding AIDS, the PHS brochure based on CDC guidelines that was sent to all 107 million households in the United States in 1988, the largest public health mailing ever at the time.

=== 2005 ===
More than 2,400 Commissioned Corps officers were deployed to the Gulf Region before, during, and after Hurricanes Katrina, Rita and Wilma. This is the largest deployment in numbers in Commissioned Corps history. The officers set up and staffed field hospitals and emergency medical clinics. treated sick and injured evacuees, conducted disease surveillance, and worked closely with local and State health authorities to plan for long-term public health needs.

=== 2008 ===
The Department of Defense and the Department of Health and Human Services (HHS) established the "DoD-USPHS Partnership for Psychological Health" initiative. Officers in the Commissioned Corps were detailed to military medical treatment facilities across the nation to ensure that service members and their families received the resources they needed by increasing the availability of behavioral health service providers.

Today, the Commissioned Corps continues to pursue its mission to protect, promote, and advance the health and safety of the nation under the leadership of the Assistant Secretary of Health and the U.S. Surgeon General. The Corps have contributed to health reports, such as the 2014 Surgeon General's Report that highlighted 50 years of progress in tobacco control and prevention, presented new data on the health consequences of tobacco use, and detailed initiatives that aim to end the tobacco epidemic in the United States.

The Marine Hospital Fund was an early mechanism to provide the first publicly funded health care and disease prevention federal agency in the United States.
