= Marmer =

Marmer may refer to:

- Harry A. Marmer (1885-1953), Ukrainian-born American mathematician and oceanographer
- Nancy Marmer (b. ? ), American writer, art critic, and editor
- USC&GS Marmer, a United States Coast and Geodetic Survey survey ship in commission from 1957 to 1968
