= John Maynard Woodworth =

American physician

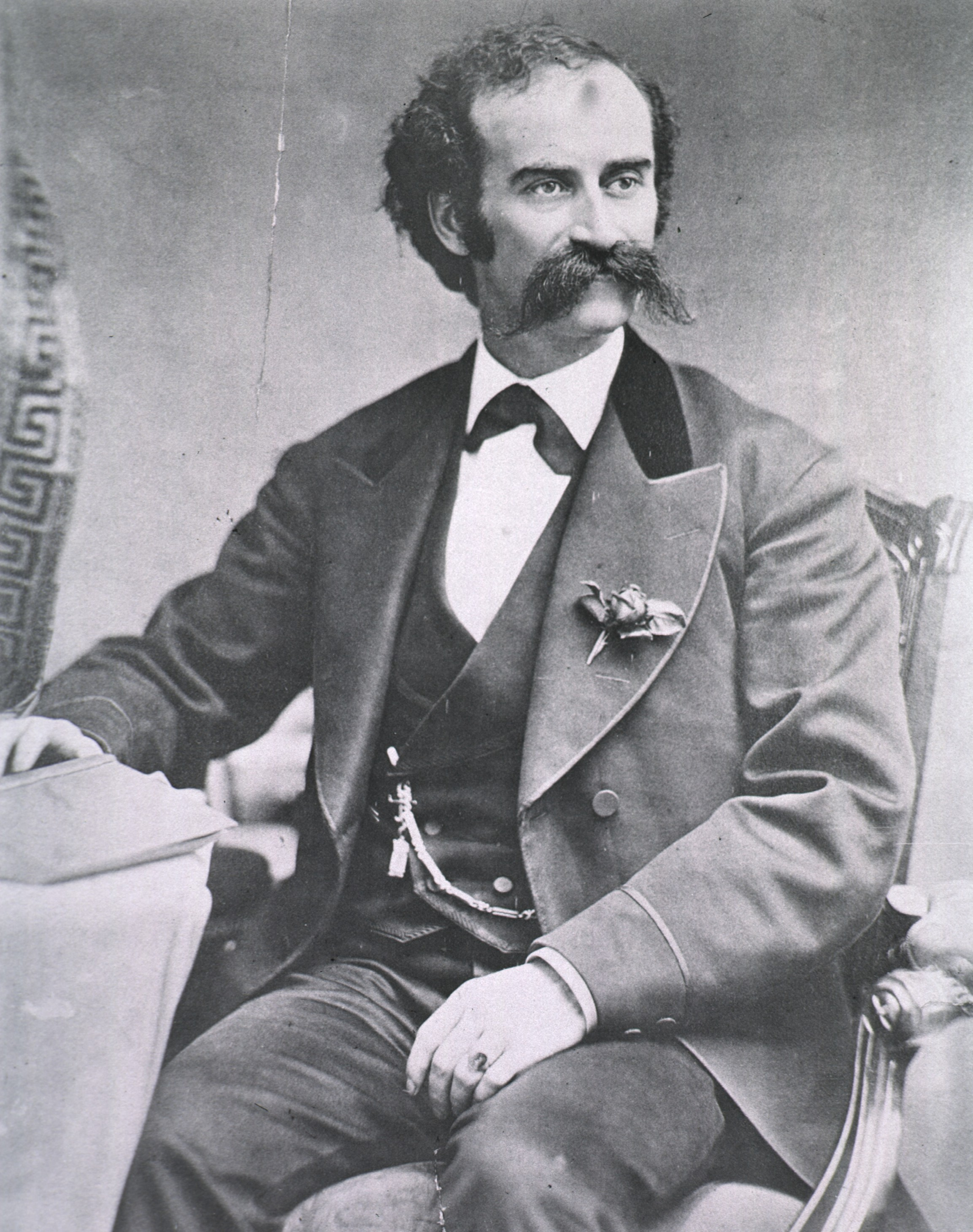

1st Surgeon General of the United States
- In office March 29, 1871 – March 14, 1879
- President: Ulysses S. Grant; Rutherford B. Hayes
- Preceded by: Position established
- Succeeded by: John B. Hamilton

Personal details
- Born: August 15, 1837 Big Flats, New York, U.S.
- Died: March 14, 1879 (aged 41) Washington, D.C., U.S.
- Party: Republican

John Maynard Woodworth (August 15, 1837 – March 14, 1879) was an American medical doctor and member of the Woodworth political family. He served as the first Supervising-Surgeon General under President Ulysses S. Grant, then changed to Surgeon General of the United States Marine Hospital Service from 1871 to 1879.

== Early life and education ==
Woodworth was born at Big Flats, New York. His family soon moved to Illinois, where Woodworth attended school in Warrenville. He studied pharmacy at the University of Chicago and worked as a pharmacist for a time.

Woodworth was one of the organizers of the Chicago Academy of Science and in 1858 became curator of its museum. In this capacity, he made several trips west of the Mississippi River to collect natural history specimens. He was appointed naturalist by the University of Chicago in 1859 and asked to establish a museum of natural history. Woodworth also spent time working at the Smithsonian Institution over the next few years. He then decided to embark on medical studies, and graduated from the Chicago Medical College in 1862.

== Career ==
Almost immediately upon graduating from medical school, Woodworth was appointed Assistant Surgeon in the Union Army. He was soon promoted to Surgeon and eventually became Medical Director of the Army of the Tennessee. Woodworth served under General William Tecumseh Sherman, and on "Sherman's March to the Sea" he was in charge of the ambulance train, bringing the sick and wounded to Savannah without the loss of a single man.

After the war, Woodworth became a companion of the Pennsylvania Commandery of the Military Order of the Loyal Legion of the United States.

Following the Civil War, Woodworth spent a year in Europe, receiving clinical instruction chiefly in the hospitals of Berlin and Vienna. In 1866, he became demonstrator in anatomy at the Chicago Medical College. He was also appointed Surgeon of the Soldier's home of Chicago and Sanitary Inspector of the Chicago Board of Health in that same year.

== Surgeon General ==
In 1871, Woodworth was appointed the first Supervising Surgeon of the Marine Hospital Service. The Service had its origins in a 1798 Act of Congress "for the relief of sick and disabled seamen." The 1798 law created a fund to be used by the Federal Government of the United States to provide medical services to merchant seamen in American ports, which was expanded to include military and others who made their living associated with seagoing. The marine hospital fund was administered by the Treasury Department and financed through a monthly deduction from the wages of the seamen. Medical care was provided through contracts with existing hospitals and, increasingly as time went on, through the construction of new hospitals for this purpose. The earliest marine hospitals were located along the East Coast of the United States, with Boston being the site of the first such facility, but later they were also established along inland waterways, the Great Lakes, and the Gulf Coast and Pacific Coast.

The marine hospitals hardly constituted a system in the Antebellum period. Funds for the hospitals were inadequate, political rather than medical reasons often influenced the choice of sites for hospitals and the selection of physicians, and the Treasury Department had little supervisory authority over the hospitals. During the Civil War, the Union and Confederate forces occupied the hospitals for their own use, and in 1864 only 8 of the 27 hospitals listed before the war were operational. In 1869, the United States Secretary of the Treasury commissioned an extensive study of the marine hospitals, and the resulting critical report led to the passage of reform legislation in the following year.

The 1870 reorganization converted the loose network of locally controlled hospitals into a centrally controlled Marine Hospital Service, with its headquarters in Washington, D.C. The position of Supervising Surgeon (later Surgeon General) was created to administer the Service. Woodworth began his service in the position on March 29, 1871, and he moved quickly to reform the system. He adopted a military model for his medical staff, instituting examinations for applicants instead of appointing physicians on the recommendation of the local Collector of Customs. Physicians, whom Woodworth placed in uniforms, were no longer appointed to serve in a particular facility, but appointed to the general Service. In this way, Woodworth created a cadre of mobile, career service physicians who could be assigned and moved as needed to the various marine hospitals. The uniformed services component of the Marine Hospital Service was formalized as the Commissioned Corps by legislation enacted in 1889 under Woodworth's successor, John B. Hamilton.

In 1872, Woodworth initiated the publication of annual reports of the Marine Hospital Service. That same year he also served as one of the founders of the American Public Health Association.

From the time of his appointment, Woodworth envisioned broader responsibilities for the Marine Hospital Service, well beyond the care of merchant seamen. In 1873, his title was changed to Supervising Surgeon General. He issued publications on cholera and yellow fever, and laid the foundations for the passage of the National Quarantine Act of 1878. This Act conferred quarantine authority on the Marine Hospital Service, initiating a process whereby over the next half a century the Service progressively took over quarantine functions from the states. The Act also authorized the publication of Bulletins of the Public Health (the forerunner of the Service's journal Public Health Reports). The Marine Hospital Service thus moved into public health activities under Woodworth, paving the way for its later evolution into the Public Health Service.

Woodworth also designed the seal of the Service, which he first used on a publication that he authored in 1874 on Nomenclature of Diseases. The seal consisted of a fouled anchor, to represent the seamen cared for by the Service, and the caduceus of Mercury. The latter symbol was particularly appropriate since it served as a symbol of commerce (which could represent the merchant marine) but was also used by the Army Medical Corps as its symbol. With minor changes in design, this device has remained the seal of the Public Health Service to the present day.

Woodworth remained in the position of Supervising Surgeon General until his death in Washington, DC, on March 14, 1879.
