= Walter Wyman =

American physician and soldier

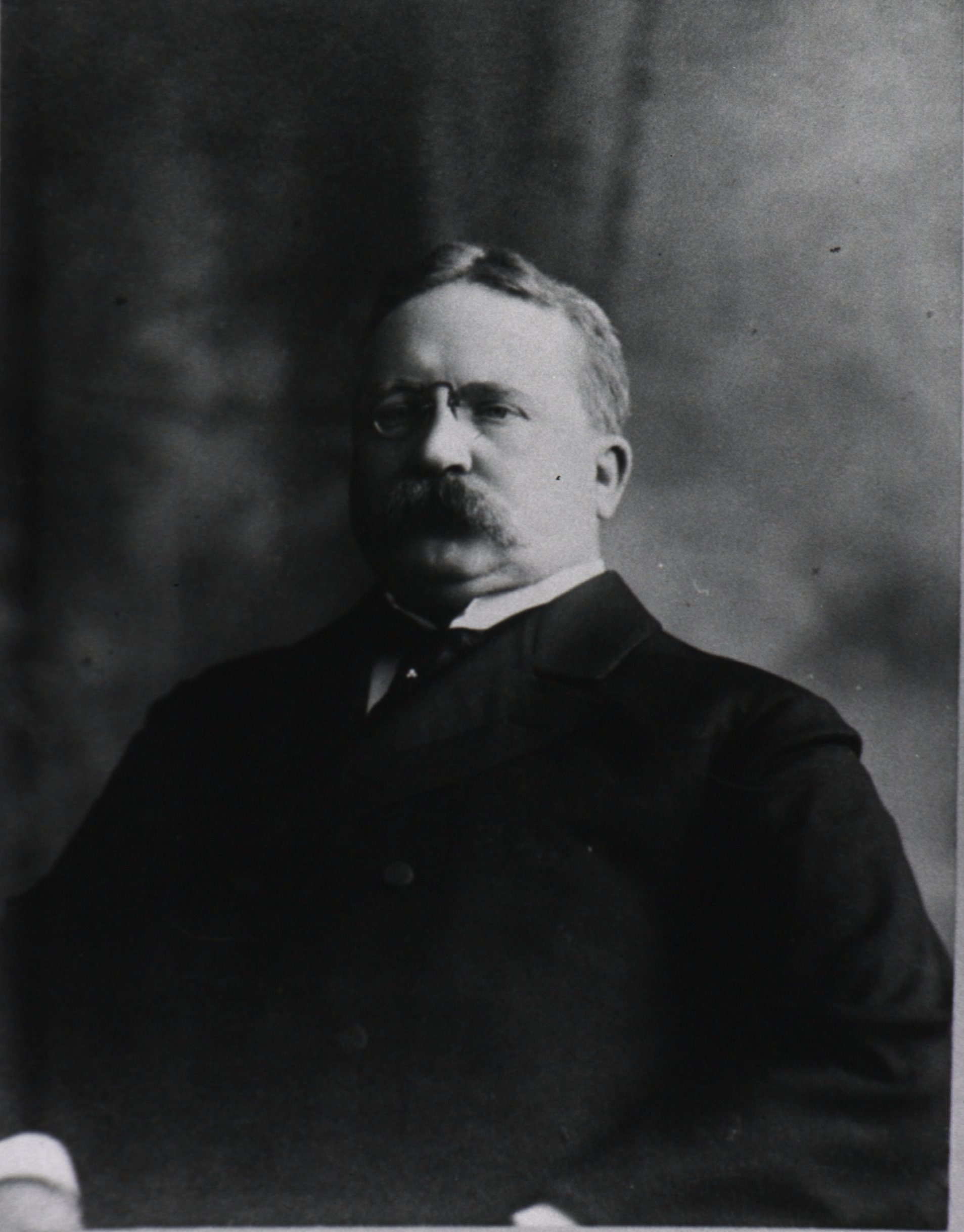

3rd Surgeon General of the United States
- In office June 1, 1891 – November 21, 1911
- President: Benjamin Harrison; Grover Cleveland; William McKinley; Theodore Roosevelt; William Howard Taft
- Preceded by: John B. Hamilton
- Succeeded by: Rupert Blue

Personal details
- Born: August 17, 1848 St. Louis, Missouri, U.S.
- Died: November 21, 1911 (aged 63) Washington, D.C.
- Education: Amherst College; Washington University School of Medicine
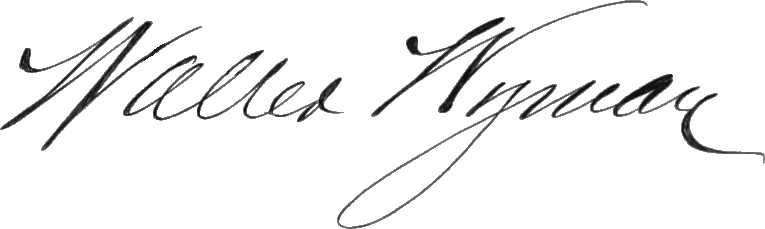
- Signature

Walter Wyman (August 17, 1848 – November 21, 1911) was an American physician and soldier. He was appointed the third Surgeon General of the United States from 1891 until his death in 1911. He remains the longest-serving Surgeon General.

== Biography ==
=== Early years ===
Wyman was born in St. Louis, Missouri. He obtained his A.B. degree from Amherst College in 1870 and then graduated in 1873 from the St. Louis Medical College (now Washington University School of Medicine)

=== Career ===
Wyman served as a physician at the city hospital in St. Louis for two years and then engaged in private practice for another year before joining the Marine Hospital Service in 1876 as an Assistant Surgeon. He was promoted to Surgeon the following year, and served successively in the marine hospitals at St. Louis, Cincinnati, Baltimore, and New York City. While he was in charge of the marine hospital in Staten Island, New York, the Hygienic Laboratory (forerunner of the National Institutes of Health) was established there in 1887 by Supervising Surgeon General John B. Hamilton. Wyman had studied in Europe in 1885, and was well acquainted with the bacteriological investigations of Robert Koch and others. He fully supported the creation of the Hygienic Laboratory.

In December 1888, Wyman moved to Washington, D.C. as Chief of the Quarantine Division. When Hamilton resigned as Supervising Surgeon General, Wyman was appointed to the position as of June 1, 1891. He was to remain at the helm of the Marine Hospital Service for 20 years.

During Wyman's tenure, the Marine Hospital Service significantly expanded its responsibilities, and in 1902 was renamed the Public Health and Marine Hospital Service. At that time, Wyman's title was also changed from Supervising Surgeon General to just Surgeon General. As a result of immigration legislation passed on March 3, 1891, shortly before Wyman took office, the Marine Hospital Service was assigned responsibility for the medical inspection of arriving immigrations. The largest immigration depot was Ellis Island in New York, opened in 1892, where service physicians would inspect thousands of arriving immigrants on busy days. The quarantine activities of the service were expanded by legislative acts of 1893 and 1906, and maritime quarantine functions were extended to Hawaii, Cuba, Puerto Rico, the Panama Canal, and the Philippine Islands.

The 1902 act, which changed the name of the service, also charged the Surgeon General with convening a conference of state health authorities at least on an annual basis, and directed him to prepare and distribute to state health officers forms for the uniform compilation of vital statistics. This statistical information was published in the service's journal, Public Health Reports. The 1902 law also expanded the Hygienic Laboratory, which Wyman had moved to Washington, D.C., in 1891. Under Wyman's administration, the Laboratory significantly increased its research activities, including studies on diseases such as hookworm and Rocky Mountain spotted fever, and was provided with a new building in 1901. The 1902 Biologics Control Act gave the Laboratory responsibility for the regulation of biological products such as vaccines and antitoxins.

In the early years of the twentieth century, Surgeon General Wyman found himself in the midst of a controversy over the San Francisco plague of 1900–1904. The service first became involved in the situation in 1900 when MHS physician Joseph J. Kinyoun, stationed in San Francisco, confirmed by bacteriological analysis that the death of a laborer in the city's Chinatown section was due to bubonic plague. Many local officials and business leaders, as well as Chinatown residents, concerned about how fears of plague would affect their lives and businesses, denied the existence of the disease and/or resisted quarantine and immunization efforts. When Wyman attempted to enforce an embargo on interstate travel for Californians without proper health certificates, the Governor of the state, Henry Gage, persuaded President McKinley to lift the travel ban. By 1903, however, the situation had become serious enough that an emergency conference was held in Washington, D.C., and a recommendation was made that all traffic between California and the rest of the country be halted unless Federal authorities were permitted to carry out their eradication campaign. Faced with the threat of a national boycott, San Francisco officials cooperated with Wyman and the service, and a successful campaign to eliminate the disease was led by Public Health Service physician Rupert Blue (who later served as Surgeon General). The service under Wyman also cooperated with state and local health authorities in the control of other infectious diseases such as yellow fever.

Wyman was involved in the creation of the Pan American Sanitary Bureau in 1902. From the time of its organization until 1936, the Surgeons General of the Public Health Service served as the Directors of the Bureau, with Wyman as Director until his death in 1911. Many of Wyman's health policies and principles were adopted by the Bureau. He also played a leading role in the first four Inter-American Sanitary Conferences, acting as President of the first two and attending the next two as the United States Delegate.

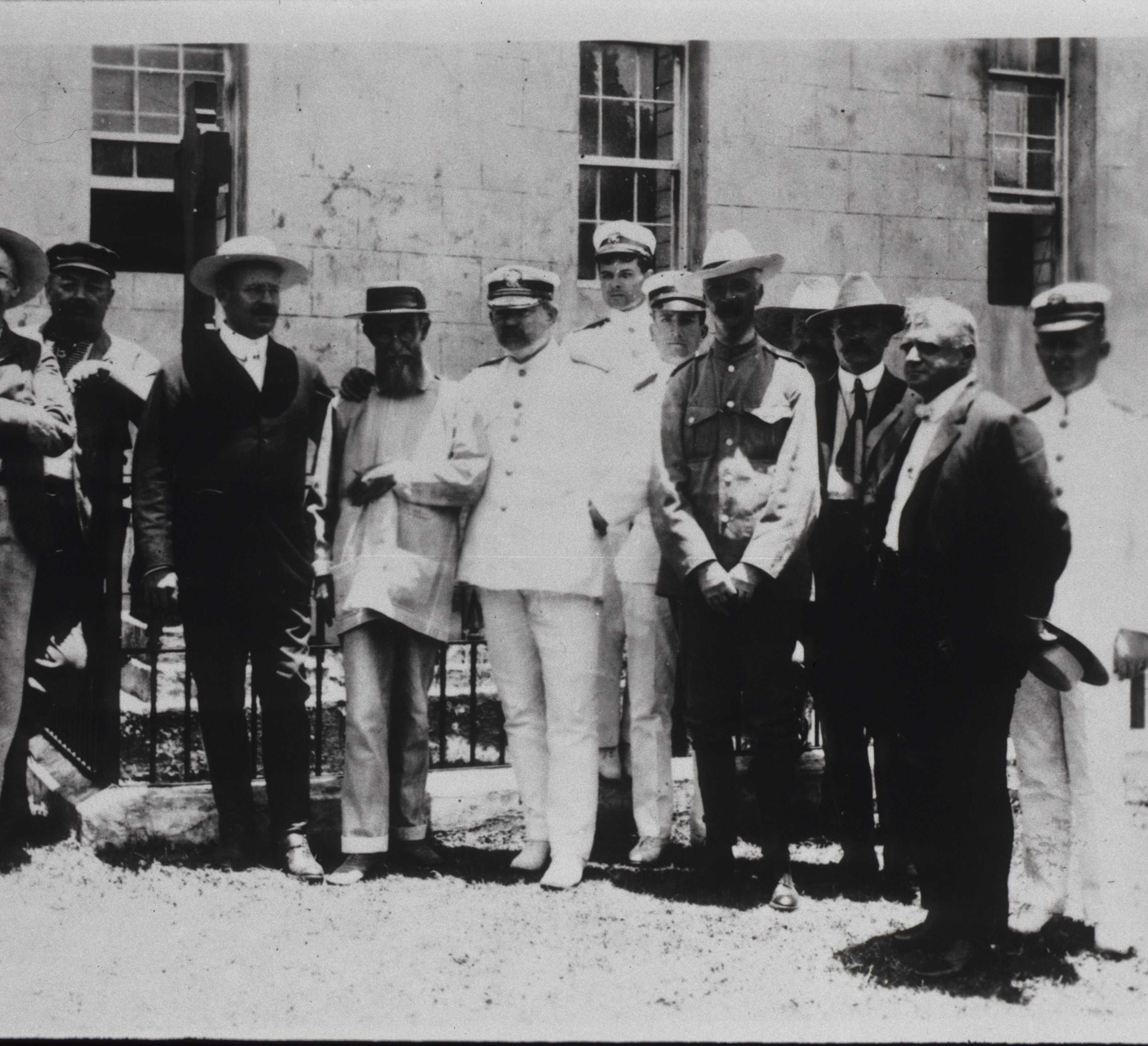
Wyman, Brother Joseph Dutton and others at Father Damien's grave, 1905

Wyman authorized a nationwide study of the prevalence of leprosy in 1901, and worked to establish a leprosy hospital and laboratory in Hawaii. In 1905, Wyman personally went to Hawaii to select the site of the new facility.

During his tenure as surgeon general, Wyman was active in professional service in a number of organizations. For example, he served as president of the American Public Health Association in 1902 and as president of the Association of Military Surgeons in 1904.

Wyman was a member of the Society of Colonial Wars. Lake Wyman in Boca Raton, Florida was named for him. He was reported being to the north in Lake Worth in 1883.

Wyman continued to serve as surgeon general until his death at Providence Hospital in Washington, D.C., on November 21, 1911.

== Commemoration ==
The Public Health Service boarding tug USPHS Walter Wyman, in service from 1932 to 1957, was named for Wyman.
