= Association of Schools and Programs of Public Health =

U.S.-based membership association for accredited schools and programs of public health

- Abbreviation: ASPPH
- Predecessor: Association of Schools of Public Health (ASPH)
- Formation: 1941
- Type: Public health education association
- Headquarters: Washington, D.C., U.S.
- President and CEO: Laura Magaña
- Website: aspph.org

The Association of Schools and Programs of Public Health (ASPPH) is a nonprofit organization that represents accredited schools and programs of public health. Its members include institutions accredited by the Council on Education for Public Health (CEPH) in the United States and internationally. ASPPH works to advance academic public health through education, research, workforce development, and collaboration with governmental and public health organizations.

The organization was founded in 1941 as the Association of Schools of Public Health (ASPH) by the deans of accredited schools of public health to promote excellence in graduate public health education and strengthen collaboration among institutions. In 2013, the organization adopted its current name to reflect the inclusion of CEPH-accredited public health programs in addition to schools.

ASPPH represents more than 150 schools and programs of public health and a community of over 103,000 deans, faculty, staff, and students, and convenes academic institutions, public health agencies, and partners to support public health education and workforce development.

== History ==
The Association of Schools of Public Health (ASPH) was founded in 1941 by the deans of accredited schools of public health to promote collaboration in public health education and research.

During the second half of the twentieth century, ASPH served as a national association representing schools of public health in the United States and participated in national discussions related to public health education, prevention research, and workforce development.

The association's activities were built on national efforts to develop academic pathways in public health education.

In 1974, ASPH collaborated with the American Public Health Association (APHA) to establish the Council on Education for Public Health (CEPH), which accredits schools and programs of public health.

Following the 1988 Institute of Medicine report The Future of Public Health, which identified gaps between academic public health and public health practice, ASPH expanded efforts to strengthen connections between schools of public health and governmental public health agencies. During this period, the organization facilitated cooperative agreements between schools of public health and the Centers for Disease Control and Prevention (CDC) to support applied research and workforce training.

Membership expanded as the number of accredited schools of public health increased, growing from the original group of founding schools to more than thirty schools by the early 2000s.

In 2000, ASPH established a full-time presidential leadership structure and appointed Harrison C. Spencer as its first full-time president and chief executive officer.

In 2013, ASPH changed its name to the Association of Schools and Programs of Public Health (ASPPH) to reflect the inclusion of CEPH-accredited public health programs in addition to schools.

== Membership ==
ASPPH membership consists of graduate schools and programs of public health accredited by the Council on Education for Public Health (CEPH) or holding CEPH applicant status. Members include schools and programs of public health in the United States and internationally.

These institutions provide graduate education in public health disciplines, including epidemiology, biostatistics, environmental health sciences, health policy and management, and social and behavioral sciences.

The organization expanded its membership structure in 2013 to include CEPH-accredited public health programs in addition to schools of public health.

ASPPH reports a membership of more than 150 institutions and over 103,000 affiliated deans, faculty, staff, and students.

== Governance ==
ASPPH is governed by a board composed of leaders from member institutions. Historically, the board consisted primarily of deans of accredited schools of public health. As the organization expanded its membership to include accredited public health programs, governance structures evolved to include both deans and program directors representing member institutions.

== Activities ==
ASPPH conducts activities intended to support academic public health and strengthen the public health workforce. These activities include convening academic and public health leaders, supporting collaboration between academic institutions and public health practice organizations, and providing resources related to public health education and workforce development. ASPPH also engages in policy advocacy related to public health education and workforce development, provides student-facing services, and convenes members around important public health initiatives.

The organization also collects data from member institutions on topics such as applications, enrollment, graduates, faculty, and institutional characteristics to monitor trends in academic public health education and workforce development.

ASPPH also participates in international collaborations among academic public health institutions and is a founding member of the Global Network for Academic Public Health (GNAPH).

== Publications ==
ASPPH is the publisher of Public Health Reports, the journal of the U.S. Public Health Service, with SAGE Publications as publishing partner.

ASPPH also offers two public-facing weekly newsletters – Policy & Advocacy, which will help readers stay up-to-date on federal public health policy topics and on how ASPPH is advocating for academic public health, and The Friday Letter, where readers can learn about the latest in ASPPH news, public health research developments, funding opportunities, member updates, awards, and more.

== Leadership and headquarters ==
Several public health leaders have served in executive leadership roles at ASPPH. Michael K. Gemmell, CAE, served as executive director from 1978 to 2003. Dr. Harrison C. Spencer served as president and chief executive officer beginning in 2000. Dr. Laura Magaña has served as president and chief executive officer since 2017.

ASPPH's offices are located in Washington, D.C.

== See also ==
- Council on Education for Public Health
- American Public Health Association
