= NOAAS Ferrel =

American hydrographic survey ship

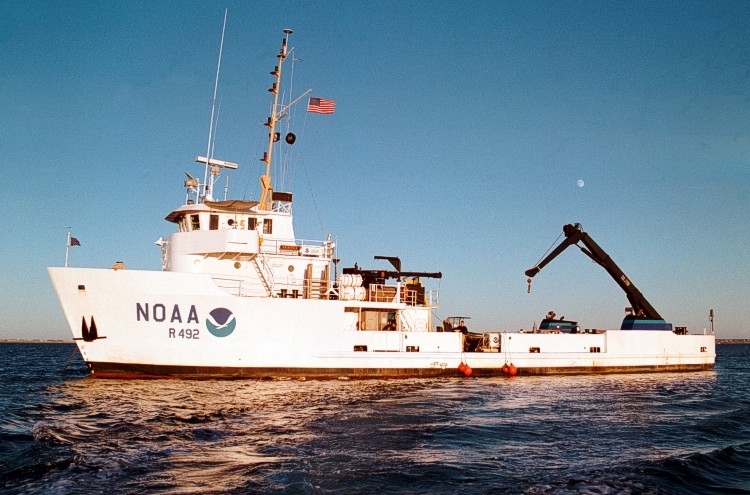
- NOAAS Ferrel (S 492)

History

U.S. Coast and Geodetic Survey
- Name: USC&GS Ferrel (ASV 92)
- Namesake: William Ferrel (1817–1891), American meteorologist
- Builder: Zigler Shipyards, Jennings, Louisiana
- Sponsored by: Mrs. Marion L. Land
- Completed: 1968
- Commissioned: 4 June 1968
- Fate: Transferred to National Oceanic and Atmospheric Administration 3 October 1970

NOAA
- Name: NOAAS Ferrel (S 492)
- Namesake: Previous name retained
- Acquired: Transferred from U.S. Coast and Geodetic Survey 3 October 1970
- Decommissioned: 21 November 2002
- Home port: Charleston, South Carolina
- Identification: IMO number: 7629960; MMSI number: 338574000; Callsign: WTEZ
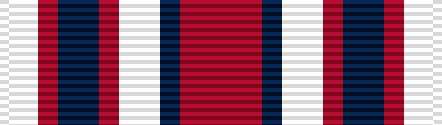
- Honors and awards: Department of Commerce Silver Medal 1995
- Fate: Capsized and driven ashore during Hurricane Maria, 20 September 2017

General characteristics
- Class & type: S1-MT-83a
- Type: Hydrographic survey ship
- Length: 133 ft (41 m)
- Beam: 32 ft (9.8 m) (moulded)
- Draft: 8 ft (2.4 m)
- Propulsion: Two diesel engines, 2 shafts, bow thruster
- Speed: 10 knots (19 km/h) (cruising)
- Range: 1,200 nautical miles (2,200 km)
- Endurance: 9 days

NOAAS Ferrel (S 492) was an American hydrographic survey ship that was in commission in the National Oceanic and Atmospheric Administration (NOAA) from 1970 to 2002. Prior to her NOAA career, she was in commission in the United States Coast and Geodetic Survey from 1968 to 1970 as USC&GS Ferrel (ASV 92).

== Construction and commissioning ==
Ferrel was built as an "auxiliary survey vessel" (ASV) for the U.S. Coast and Geodetic Survey at Zigler Shipyards in Jennings, Louisiana. She was completed in 1968 and commissioned in a ceremony at Zigler Shipyards on 4 June 1968 into Coast and Geodetic Survey service as USC&GS Ferrel (ASV 92), sponsored by Mrs. Marion L. Land. When the Coast and Geodetic Survey merged with other United States Government organizations to form NOAA on 3 October 1970, she became a part of the NOAA fleet as NOAAS Ferrel (S 492).

== Design and capabilities ==
Ferrel was modified from the basic design for an offshore oil rig supply boat and was equipped specifically for oceanographic studies of coastal and inshore waters. She had a large open fantail for the handling of equipment, a crane aft, a trawl winch, an oceanographic winch located amidships, and an A-frame.

== Service history ==
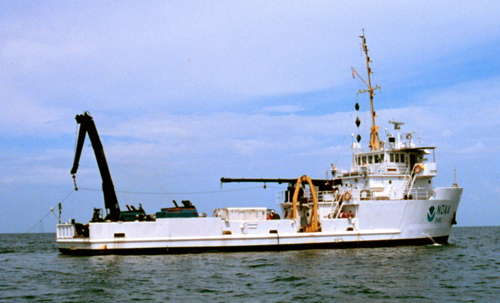
NOAAS Ferrel (S 492) in the Dry Tortugas area of Florida.

The Coast and Geodetic Survey intended Ferrel to replace the survey ship USC&GS Marmer and conduct current surveys in various harbors and waterways along the United States East Coast and United States Gulf Coast. During the 1970s, however, she became the primary platform for the NOAA Status and Trends Program and other environmental monitoring programs. Her home port was Charleston, South Carolina.

In recognition of unusual competence in an emergency, excellent judgment, and superb seamanship, four members of Ferrel's crew – Commander John K. Callahan, Jr., NOAA Corps; Lieutenant Commander Richard P. Floyd, NOAA Corps; Chief Boatswain's Mate David L. Brannon; and Seaman Surveyor Gordon R. Pringle – received the Department of Commerce Silver Medal in 1981 for effecting the rapid rescue of a passenger who fell overboard from a sightseeing vessel in New York Harbor.

As Ferrel was docking at the Port of Corpus Christi in Texas on 17 September 1986, Evelyn Langanke fell from a bridge abutment near the ship into a 35-foot- (10.7-meter-) deep ship channel. Ferrel's executive officer, Lieutenant Commander Ted I. Lillestolen, NOAA Corps, noted that Langanke was in trouble, ran from the ship, entered the water, and swam to the woman, who was thrashing feebly when he reached her. He made a proper lifesaving approach and towed the unconscious woman to shore. Commander Robert E. Hunt, NOAA Corps, and Lieutenant Paul E. Pegnato, NOAA Corps, both also of Ferrel, came to Langanke's medical assistance, with Hunt using cardiopulmonary resuscitation to revive her and Pegnato administering oxygen and first aid to stabilize her condition. Langanke had suffered a partially collapsed lung, and their rescue and medical actions were crucial in saving her life. For saving and assisting Langanke, the three men received the Department of Commerce Gold Medal in 1987.

Ferrel received the Department of Commerce Silver Medal in 1995 for coming to the aid of the sailboat Suncatcher, which was carrying three sailors, low on fuel, and unable to reach their destination in the midst of worsening weather. After locating Suncatcher, Ferrel rigged a float with a tow line, secured it to Suncatcher, and towed it to safety.

Ferrel was decommissioned on 21 November 2002 and replaced by the research vessel NOAAS Nancy Foster (R 352).

Following its decommissioning, Ferrel was sold to Reservoir Marine LLC, an oil exploration company based in Sugar Land, Texas. On 20 September 2017, while crewed by a family of two adults and two children, Ferrel issued a distress call at 2:30 AM after becoming caught in Hurricane Maria. The vessel capsized and was beached on Vieques Island, Puerto Rico. One member of the crew, a British man, was killed, while the woman and two children were rescued.

== Awards ==
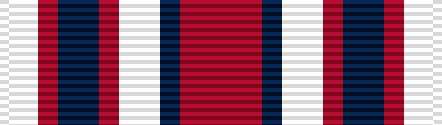
Department of Commerce Silver Medal

In a ceremony on 11 October 1995 in Washington, D.C., Ferrel received the Department of Commerce Silver Medal for coming to the assistance of Suncatcher. The program for the ceremony cited her achievements as follows:

The officers and crew of the NOAA Ship FERREL are recognized for rescuing the sailing vessel SUNCATCHER, saving the lives of three exhausted sailors. The SUNCATCHER, low on fuel and in the midst of worsening weather, was unable to reach her destination. The FERREL, after locating the sailing vessel, rigged a float with a tow line, secured it to the SUNCATCHER, and towed it to safety.

== See also ==
- NOAA ships and aircraft
