= John B. Hamilton =

American physician and soldier

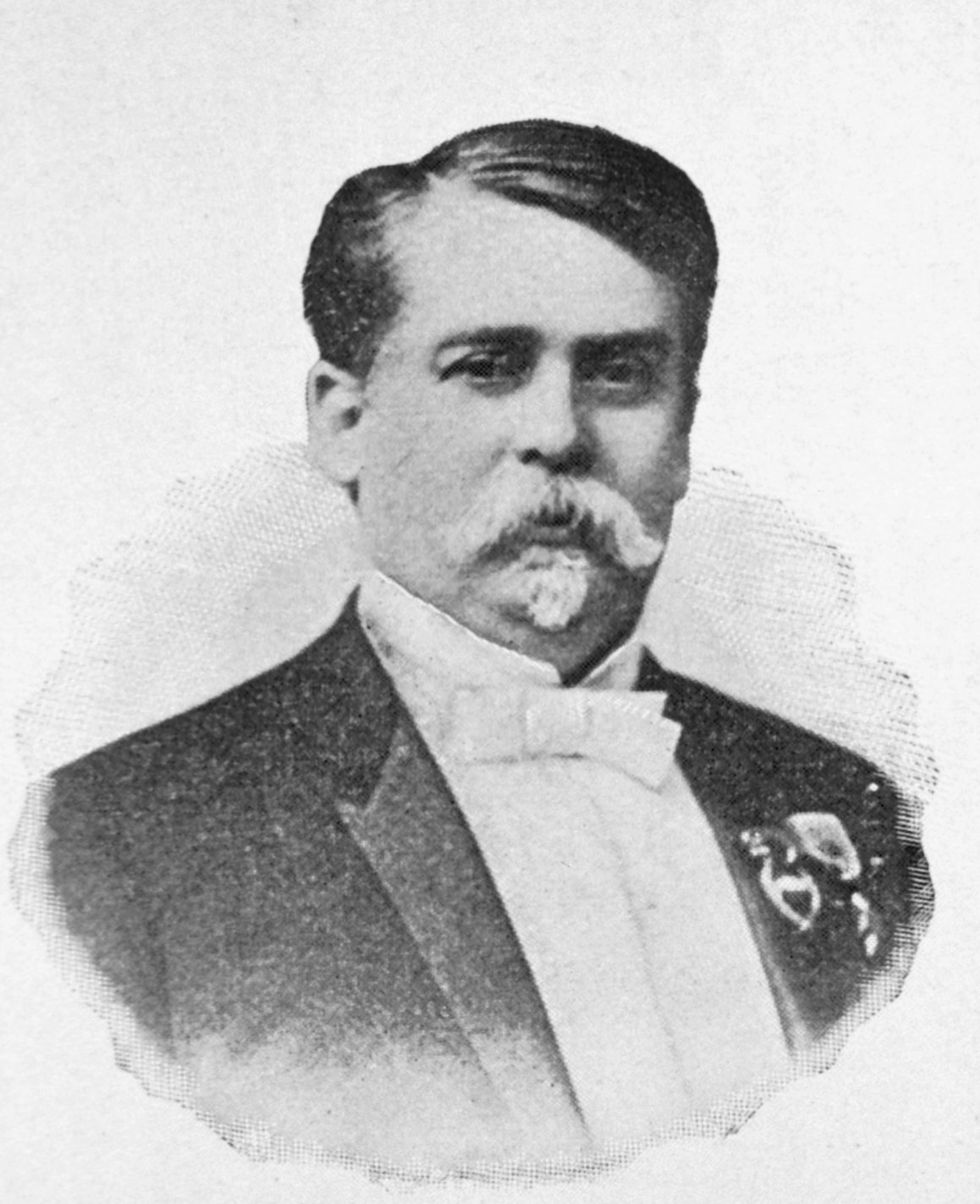

2nd Surgeon General of the United States
- In office April 3, 1879 – June 1, 1891
- President: Rutherford B. Hayes; James Garfield; Chester A. Arthur; Grover Cleveland; Benjamin Harrison
- Preceded by: John Maynard Woodworth
- Succeeded by: Walter Wyman

Personal details
- Born: December 1, 1847 Otter Creek Township, Jersey County, Illinois, US
- Died: December 24, 1898 (aged 51) Elgin, Illinois, US

John Brown Hamilton (December 1, 1847 – December 24, 1898) was an American physician and soldier. He was appointed the second Surgeon General of the United States from 1879 to 1891.

== Biography ==
=== Early years ===
Hamilton was born on at Otter Creek Township, Jersey County, Illinois, near the present town of Otterville. He was educated at the Hamilton School, operated by his family, and apprenticed at age 16 to physician Joseph O. Hamilton. The following year (1864), Hamilton enlisted in G Company, 61st Illinois Regiment, of which his father, Reverend Benjamin B. Hamilton, was chaplain. After the close of the Civil War, he attended Rush Medical College in Chicago (1869, MD) and entered private practice.

=== Career ===
==== Marine Hospital Service (MHS) ====
Hamilton's wartime experiences exerted their influence, drawing him from private medical practice into a commission as an Assistant Surgeon in the United States Army (1874) and after he resigned from the Army, into the Regular Corps of the Marine Hospital Service (MHS). In 1876, the 24-year-old Hamilton sat for the first examination for entrance into MHS, passed with flying colors, and was commissioned as an Assistant Surgeon on Oct 21, 1876. His talent in public health practice revealed itself early, during an 1877 assignment to the Boston Marine Hospital at Chelsea, Massachusetts. Changing land use in the area had blocked hospital sewage from draining properly, causing unexpected outbreaks of infectious disease among patients. Hamilton resolved the crisis successfully by directing a renovation of the facility's drainage and sewage systems.

==== Surgeon General ====
On April 3, 1879, Hamilton was appointed Supervising Surgeon General, succeeding fellow Army veteran and Chicagoan Dr. John Woodworth, the first Supervising Surgeon. Woodworth had died in office, amidst a political battle with the fledgling American Public Health Association and its allies in the United States Congress over the possibility that a new National Board of Health would supersede the newly revamped MHS (1871).

That MHS outlived the National Board of Health and emerged in the 1890s reinvigorated is a testament to Hamilton's skills as a political negotiator as well as a bureaucrat. Under his tenure, MHS gained authorities to establish a national quarantine on sea and land (interstate), formal recognition of merit-based requirements for a Commissioned Corps of medical officers, and a new laboratory devoted to bacteriology, the newest public health science of the day.

==== Development of quarantine policy ====
Two national epidemics framed Hamilton's tenure: the yellow fever epidemic of 1878 that raged along the Mississippi River Valley and the Asiatic cholera epidemic of 1892, which hit New York City with particular ferocity. Sanitary cordons, or quarantine, were the primary response to yellow fever, to block the progress of disease believed to be conveyed not only on boats and foot traffic but also now by railroad. Instituting quarantines, however, meant Federal intervention into what was widely held to be state police powers and met resistance in the southeastern United States where the issue of yellow fever, and its impact on trade, were most critical.

Advocates of a National Board of Health, including Army Surgeon John Shaw Billings, were spurred to action by the insufficient funding allotted to the Quarantine Act of 1878. Over the following four years, Hamilton would press Billings at every turn, in a protracted, ultimately successful effort to regain authorities and recognition of MHS as the central Federal public health agency. When Billings began publishing MHS's Bulletin under the Board's auspices, Hamilton countered by persuading Congress to fund new Marine Hospitals in locations like Sitka, Alaska, to strengthen collaboration with the Revenue Cutter Service (predecessor to the United States Coast Guard).

The Board distributed grants-in-aid to state and territorial health departments for what were called "inland quarantines" but had a mixed record in regulating the uses to which grants were put and made political enemies when it attempted to quell yellow fever by means of a quarantine station on Ship Island, near New Orleans.

While the Board struggled with clumsy administrative mechanisms, Hamilton demonstrated how MHS's relationships with customs inspectors and the Revenue Cutter Service enabled a quick and effective quarantine response to smallpox aboard a Mississippi River steamboat at Fort Benton, Montana Territory (May 1882), and how MHS blocked yellow fever in Mexico from entry into Brownsville, Texas by means of a sanitary cordon hastily assembled around the region. Congress recognized Hamilton's leadership and in 1882 and 1883 awarded MHS a $100,000 fund for investigating epidemics, monies that had been slated for the Board. When Billings and his colleagues attempted to revive the idea of a National Board as a new Bureau of Health within the Department of the Interior, Hamilton announced that during August 1887 MHS had established a Hygienic Laboratory (predecessor to the National Institutes of Health), where Dr. Joseph J. Kinyoun and his staff were applying the new science of bacteriology to examine cholera. In the end, the National Board of Health lost both funding and support from Congress, which gave the Board's enlarged authorities, and its quarantine stations, to MHS.

Issues surrounding the practice of quarantine drove Hamilton's work in public health. It was no coincidence that the Hygienic Laboratory began in an attic at Staten Island's Marine Hospital, near Ellis Island, the single busiest port of entry for immigrants during this period. Earlier on, Hamilton had established a Marine Hospital on Bedloe's Island, future site of the Statue of Liberty. Although MHS would not receive formal authority to issue domestic quarantines until 1893, Hamilton and his staff worked with the Congress to advance incremental changes toward a national policy. Maritime quarantine legislation (Act of August 1, 1888) strengthened the Act of 1878, adding new Federal quarantine stations along the East and West coasts; March 1891 legislation made medical inspection of immigrants part of MHS's duties; and interstate quarantine legislation (Act of March 27, 1890) gave MHS authority to establish quarantines against epidemic cholera, yellow fever, smallpox, and plague. On the request of his successor, Surgeon General Walter Wyman, Hamilton also returned to New York during the 1892 cholera pandemic, to set up a quarantine camp at Sandy Hook (Camp Low).

==== Administrative reforms ====
Hamilton made limited progress with the Congress realizing Woodworth's reform plans to set MHS on sound fiscal and professional moorings. The Shipping Act of June 26, 1884 replaced the hospital tax charged to merchant seamen in favor of financing health services by means of a tonnage tax on foreign ships landing in domestic ports, supplemented by deficiency appropriations. And after Hamilton issued regulations specifying competitive examinations for entrance into a corps of medical officers, the Congress formally authorized the Commissioned Corps with the Act of January 4, 1889.

He was not able, however, to win an equal footing for MHS's Commissioned Corps with the salaries and ranks accorded to military medical officers and as a result, resigned his post as Surgeon General on June 1, 1891.

=== Personal life ===
Hamilton was a cousin of the painter Howard Chandler Christy. Hamilton married Mary L. Frost and they had a son, Dr. Ralph A. Hamilton, and a daughter, the artist Blanche Hamilton (1880-1970), who Christy encouraged to study painting with William Merritt Chase. Hamilton was recommissioned as a Surgeon and assigned to Chicago's Marine Hospital. Hamilton led a full professional life, serving as a Professor of Surgery at his alma mater, Rush Medical College, and as editor of the new Journal of the American Medical Association (1893–1898).

Hamilton was a companion of the Military Order of the Loyal Legion of the United States by right of his father's service as a chaplain in the Civil War. He originally joined the Order as a companion of the second class, a status reserved for the eldest sons of veteran companions of the Order and succeeded his father as a companion of the first class upon his father's death.

Rather than accept an assignment to San Francisco, Hamilton resigned from MHS on November 13, 1896, and accepted the position of Superintendent of the Northern Illinois State Hospital for the Insane in Elgin, Illinois. He would end his days at the hospital, dying there on December 24, 1898.
