= Rupert Blue =

Surgeon General of the United States

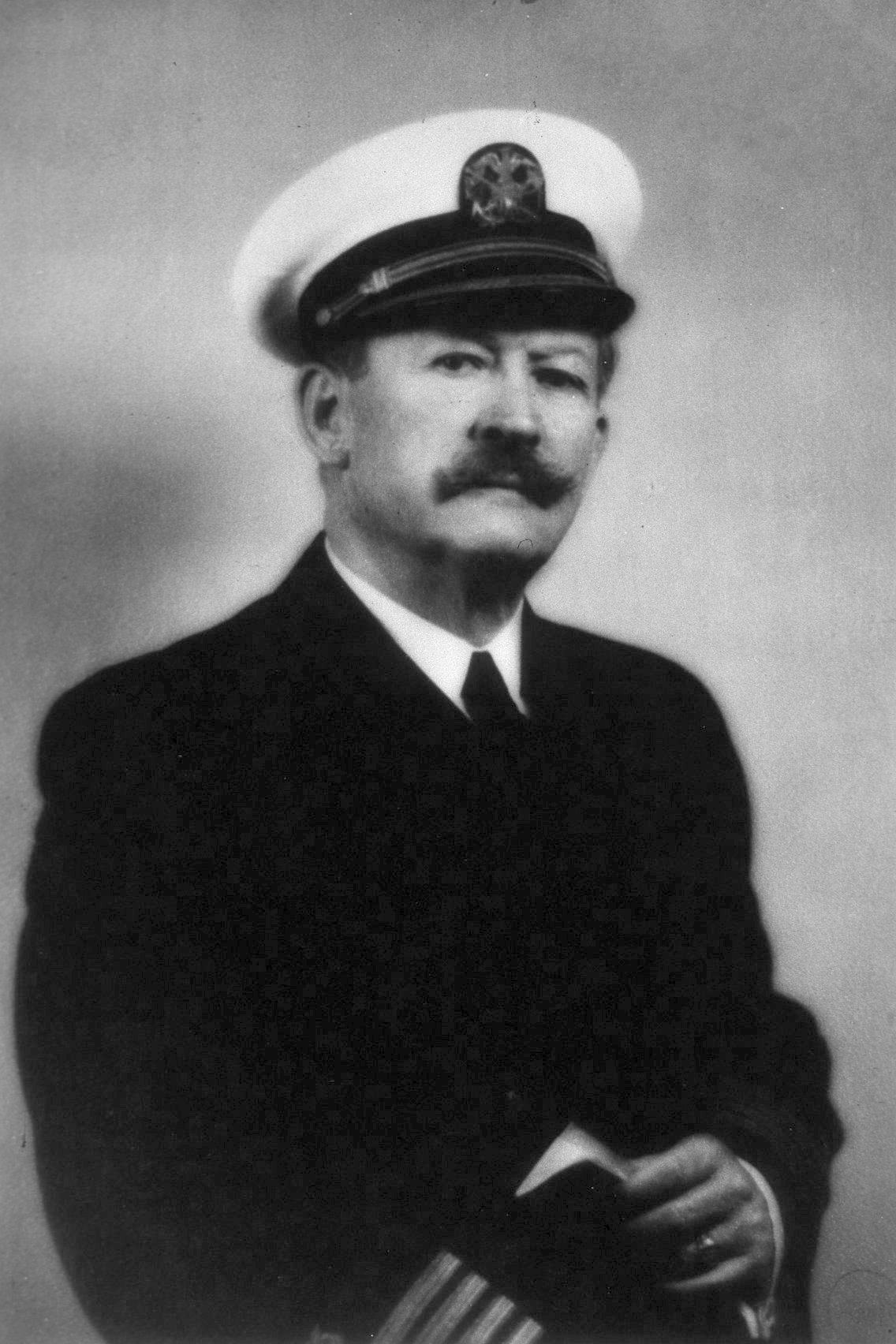

4th Surgeon General of the United States
- In office January 13, 1912 – March 3, 1920
- President: William Howard Taft; Woodrow Wilson
- Preceded by: Walter Wyman
- Succeeded by: Hugh S. Cumming

Personal details
- Born: May 30, 1868 Richmond County, North Carolina, USA
- Died: April 12, 1948 (aged 79) Charleston, South Carolina, USA

Rupert Lee Blue (May 30, 1868 – April 12, 1948) was an American physician and soldier. He was the fourth Surgeon General of the United States from 1912 to 1920. He served as president of the American Medical Association in 1916–17.

== Biography ==
=== Early years ===
Rupert Blue was born in Richmond County, North Carolina, and raised in Marion, South Carolina. He attended the University of Virginia (1889–1890) and earned his M.D. from the University of Maryland (1892). His first association with the Public Health Service (PHS), then known as the Marine Hospital Service (MHS), came through a nine-month internship (1 June 1892 to 2 March 1893), after which Blue applied for entrance into the MHS Regular Corps and was commissioned as an Assistant Surgeon on 3 March 1893.

=== Career ===
Blue spent his early years in the MHS at the front lines of turn-of-the-century public health, participating in the medical inspection of immigrants of the United States and battling outbreaks of epidemic disease. Then-Surgeon General Walter Wyman dispatched Blue twice to oversee rat eradication and urban sanitation programs after bubonic plague struck San Francisco, once in February 1903 during the San Francisco plague of 1900–1904, and again in August 1907 during a second series which followed the 1906 earthquake and fires.

During his initial deployment Blue acted as a middleman reporting back to Wyman concerning the political climate surrounding San Francisco. The majority of Blue's work consisted of acting as a mediator between the various branches of government who at the time were conflicted on their opinions of whether or not the bubonic plague was actually present in San Francisco. Upon arriving Blue was able to organize a conference between the federal, state, civil and business leaders of the area to discuss the sanitation conditions in Chinatown, where the majority of plague cases were aggregated within the city.

Blue's primary concern was to secure funding to improve the sanitation conditions of Chinatown through the implementation and maintenance of sanitation measures. These proposed measures consisted of vermin eradication, growing scientific evidence pointed to rats as carriers of the plague, and creating physical barriers between rats and humans through cementation of basement floors and walls.

This initial conference, organized by Blue, ended with the adaptation of a binding resolution that prioritized funding for sanitation campaigns throughout San Francisco until the city was declared plague free. This was the first time all levels of government had been able to put political differences aside and agree on a direction together. These conference meetings continued to occur on a biweekly notice, and eventually led to the creation of the Public Health Commission of California with Blue as its inaugural president in April 1903.

Funding for these sanitation campaigns lasted from 1903 through 1905 at which time San Francisco was declared plague free due to a decrease in mortality rate within Chinatown and the lack of any new cases reported to officials. The success of these sanitation programs were credited to Blue for his diplomacy skills among the different levels of government. With the implementation of these programs Blue was able to stem the plague and enable Wyman to avoid imposing a federal quarantine on the bay area.

In April 1905, with pressure from the municipal government of San Francisco and no new cases, Blue succeeded his position as head of the United States Public Health Service in San Francisco (after being appointed in May 1903) to Donald Currie before heading off to his next post.

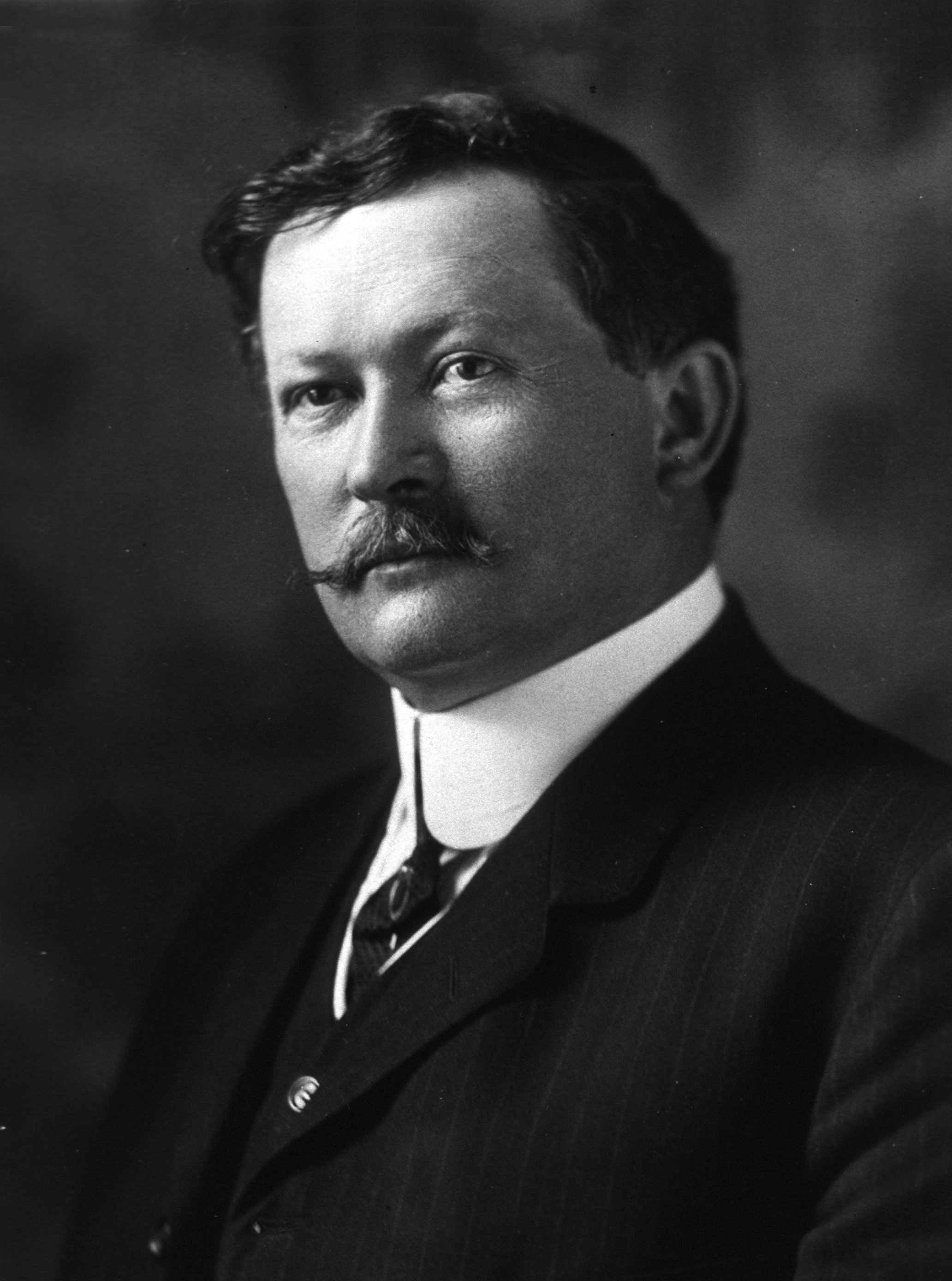
Rupert Blue

When he wasn't trapping rats and squirrels in California, Blue directed mosquito eradication efforts to control yellow fever in New Orleans (1905), at the Jamestown Exposition (1907), and in Honolulu (1911), to help Hawaii prepare for traffic to follow the opening of the new Panama Canal. In addition, he represented the United States on a number of sanitation projects in South America and attended the London School of Tropical Medicine (1910). Blue's successes in the field made his reputation. He was promoted to the position of Surgeon (17 May 1909), and after Wyman died unexpectedly, President William Howard Taft nominated Blue to serve as Surgeon General (13 January 1912 through 3 March 1920). Blue would go on to serve a second four-year term under President Woodrow Wilson (1916–1920).

Surgeon General Blue the plague fighter became an institution builder as well. He inherited the Act of 1912, which reoriented PHS toward research and public campaigns against disease. Passage of the Act of 1912 capped 6 years of lively debate about how to strengthen Federal public health efforts more generally. It designated the U.S. Treasury Department’s Marine Hospital and Public Health Service, rather than the Department of the Interior, as the lead Federal agency (and shortened the name to PHS), responsible not only for interstate quarantine and health services delivery to Federal wards but also for the health of the general public. The Act stepped up Federal public health activities, most notably in response to repeated outbreaks of typhoid fever that tore through cities and towns that drew drinking water from increasingly contaminated supplies. The Act of 1912 authorized Hygienic Laboratory investigations into water pollution's contribution to the disease burden, including a new field research station at Cincinnati, Ohio. Interstate guidelines were developed and put into effect to ensure potable water and pasteurized milk. PHS received authority to initiate field research independently of county and state health departments and to extend campaigns against infectious disease toward the control of occupational and environmental threats. During 1914 PHS opened an Office of Industrial Hygiene and Sanitation at the Marine Hospital in Pittsburgh, near the Department of the Interior’s new Bureau of Mines.

Under Blue's leadership, physician researchers at PHS turned the new science of bacteriology and the age-old practices of sanitation and public education to effective use against diseases linked to poverty in both rural and urban areas.

- Dr. George McCoy documented tularemia’s bacterial origins.
- Dr. Charles Stiles charted the extent of hookworm disease, and its positive correlation with insanitary soil conditions, throughout the Southeast.
- Dr. Joseph Goldberger used field studies at Spartanburg, South Carolina and at the Rankin State Prison Farm to uncover the nutritional deficiencies at the root of pellagra (1914–1915).
- Dr. Leslie Lumsden reduced the prevalence of typhoid fever through rural privy-building campaigns and spurred the establishment of the first full-time county health department, at Yakima, Washington (1911).
- Dr. John McMullan brought his knowledge of trachoma treatment and prevention from work with immigrants to public health campaigns among American Indians and rural populations in the Ozarks and Southern Appalachian mountains, setting up the first of his temporary hospitals at Hindman, Kentucky (1913).

=== Universal sickness insurance ===
Blue in 1916 as his dual role as U.S. surgeon general and president American Medical Association, promoted health insurance, noting the risks to 30 million workers.

- “Experience has shown that an adequate health insurance system should distribute the cost of sickness among those responsible for conditions causing it and thereby lighten the burden on the individual. Financial incentive may thus be given for the inauguration of comprehensive measures for the prevention of disease.”

=== World War I ===
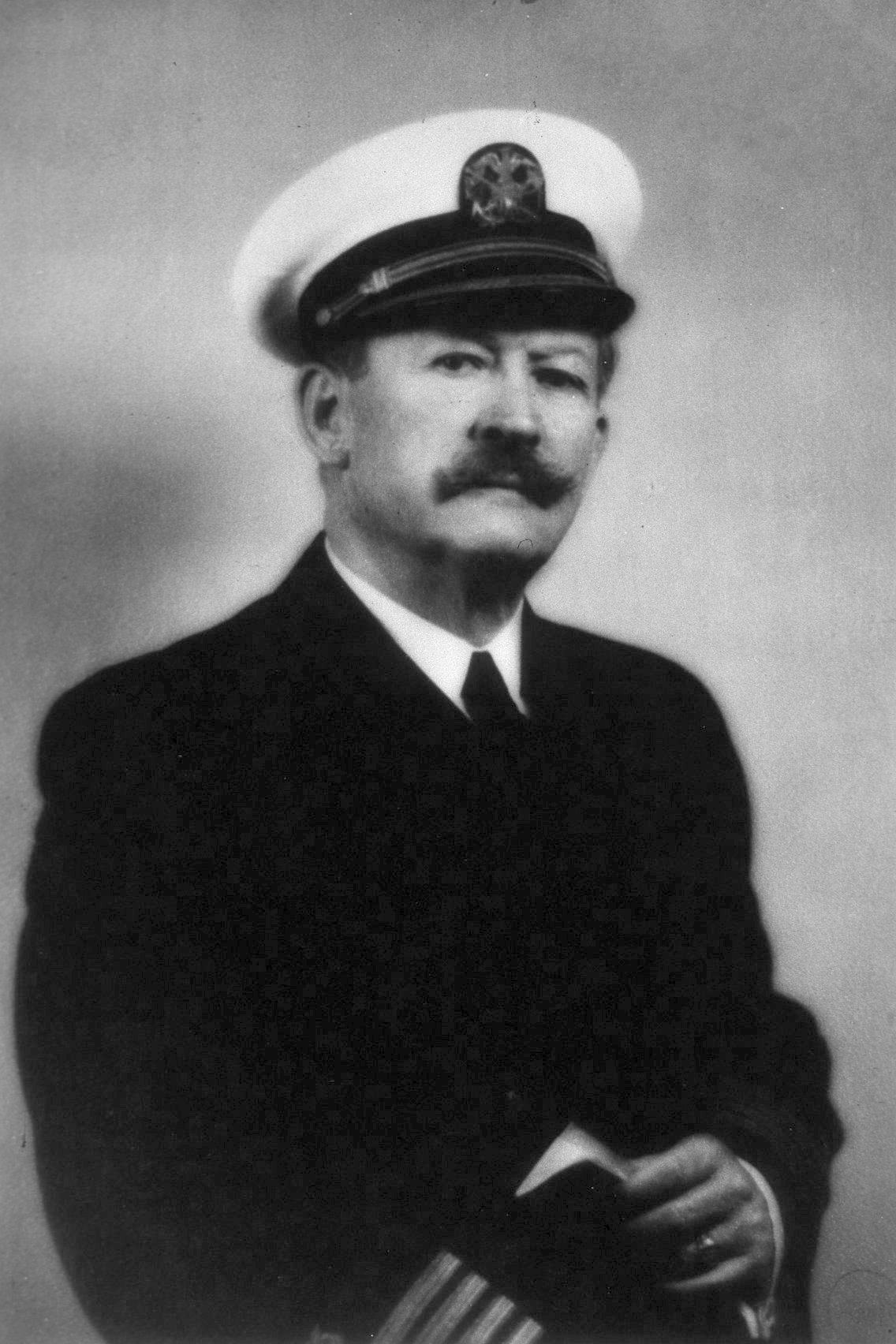
Rupert Blue during his tenure as US Surgeon General

After the United States officially entered World War I on 3 April 1917, Blue oversaw a dramatic short-term expansion of PHS duties without the benefit of increased appropriations. The military draft underway by July 1917 meant the movement of hundreds of thousands of draftees to temporary encampments around the country, with few provisions for public health by the War Department or state health departments. In response, PHS established venereal disease control programs with funding from the Red Cross, provided industrial hygiene and health services for the thousands of workers laboring in war plants and the communities surrounding them, emptied swamps and sprayed for mosquitoes to prevent malaria, and built sanitary privies. Back in Washington, D.C., the Hygienic Laboratory produced vaccines against tetanus, diphtheria, typhoid, and smallpox. Blue's public health infrastructure was up and running by the time that Congressional support came, in the form of earmarked dollars and a statute covering the control and prevention of venereal disease (the Chamberlain Act of 1918).

During World War I, under SG Rupert Blue, cigarettes were issued as part of each fighting man's basic field rations kit.

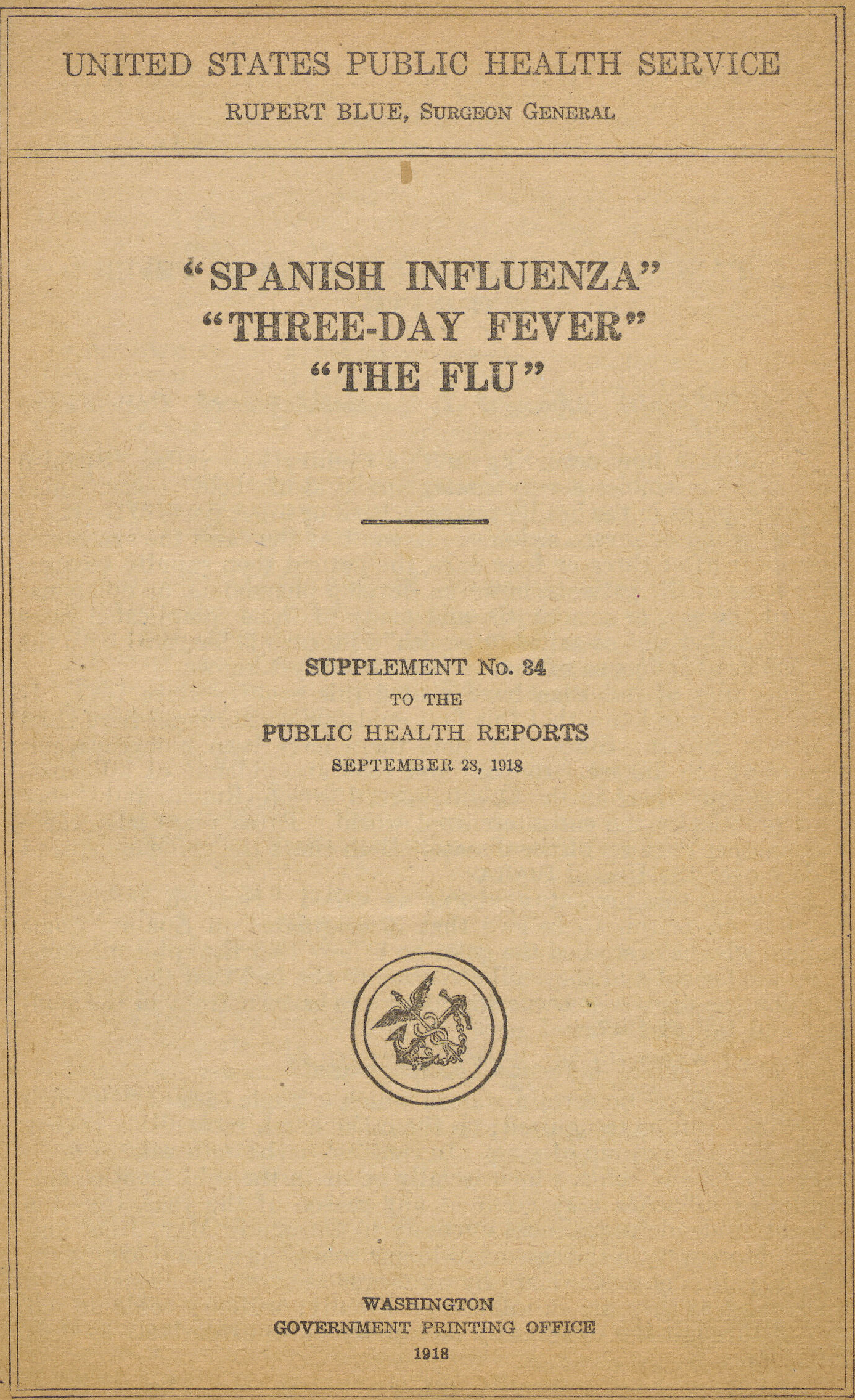
"Spanish Influenza" "Three-day Fever" "The Flu" written by Dr. Blue of the United States Public Health Service on 28 September 1918

Recruiting and retaining physicians during wartime was a challenge to PHS, a situation made worse by the global Spanish influenza pandemic that reached the United States in September 1918. Blue had applauded President Wilson's Executive Order making PHS an arm of the military (issued in April 1917 and repealed in 1921), and subsequent moves to set officers’ pay and benefits on a par with those of the armed forces, but did not see passage of legislation creating a PHS Reserve Corps until October 1918, well into the flu pandemic. Pressure to add staff also came from Congress' mandate (1917) that PHS provide health services for disabled and, as of March 1919, all World War One veterans, through a new Bureau of War Risk Insurance in the Treasury Department. Over the following year, PHS assembled a network of fourteen district offices and transformed war surplus facilities into hospitals and clinics, scrambling for staff and resources to stretch the $10.5 million given by Congress to fund the new program.

Given his tenure during this period, it may not come as a surprise that Blue advocated enacting national health insurance, then known as universal sickness insurance, as part of an overall Federal public health strategy. Blue spoke not only as Surgeon General and on behalf of the Association of State and Territorial Health Officers but also as President of the American Medical Association (1916–17).

A change in leadership at the Department of the Treasury, PHS' home, may have led to Blue's decision to step down from his posting as Surgeon General on 9 March 1920. He resumed the rank of Assistant Surgeon General and was assigned to Paris, France, to oversee PHS operations in Europe and to serve as U.S. delegate to the Office International d’Hygiene Public (1920–1923) and subsequently to the League of Nations.

After a full career at PHS, Blue retired from PHS on 1 December 1932. He was advanced to the rank of Vice Admiral in 1942. He died on 12 April 1948, in Charleston, South Carolina.

== Family ==
Blue's brother was Rear Admiral Victor Blue.
