= National Quarantine Act of 1878 =

United States regulations for foreign vessels

- Long title: An Act to prevent the introduction of contagions or infections diseases into the United States.
- Nicknames: Quarantine Act of 1878
- Enacted by: the 45th United States Congress
- Effective: April 29, 1878

Citations
- Public law: Pub. L. 45–66
- Statutes at Large: 20 Stat. 37

Legislative history
- Signed into law by President Rutherford B. Hayes on April 29, 1878

National Quarantine Act of 1878 established quarantine regulations for foreign nautical vessels pursuing entrance into United States maritime ports. The United States statute declared it to be an unlawful pursuit for international vessels departing harbors termed as infected maritime ports to enter United States seaports and territorial waters. The Act of Congress authorized the prevention of communicable and transmissible diseases from entering or being introduced by any vehicle beyond the borders of the United States.

The Marine Hospital Service was commissioned for governing the defined regulations of the public law cooperatively formulating a national quarantine service. United States consular officers were certified to report vessels departing harmful foreign ports with an inclusion of providing Public Health Reports encompassing public health surveillance of potentially tainted foreign harbors, maritime ports, and their surrounding administrative divisions.

The United States public law was passed by the 45th congressional session and enacted into law by the 19th President of the United States Rutherford Hayes on April 29, 1878.

== Clauses of the Act ==
The 1878 National Quarantine Act was drafted as six sections establishing regulations for contagious or infections diseases, transmissible maritime vessels, transitioning quarantine authority from the States to the federal government, and the development of a national quarantine system.

- Contagious or infections diseases - 20 Stat. 37 § I
  - Vessels from infected ports entering the United States
- Reports of Consular Officers - 20 Stat. 38 § II
  - Consulate to report vessels departing endangered ports
- Public Health Reports by the consulate
  - Marine Hospital Service Surgeon General to fulfill provisions of the Act
- Enforcement of Quarantine Laws - 20 Stat. 38 § III
  - Marine Hospital Service and customs officers provide enforcement of quarantine laws
- Destination Notification of Maritime Port - 20 Stat. 38 § IV
  - Notifiable disease notification to be provided to threatened port of destination for a transmissible vessel
  - Port of destination to prepare and transmit to the medical officers of the Marine Hospital Service
- State Quarantine System and National Quarantine System - 20 Stat. 38 § V
  - When officers of State quarantine system may act as officers of national quarantine system
  - When officers of Marine Hospital Service to act
- Repeal of Inconsistent Acts - 20 Stat. 38 § VI
  - All Acts or parts of Acts inconsistent with National Quarantine Act are repealed.

== See also ==
- Asymptomatic carrier
- Passenger Act of 1882
- Vapeur v. Louisiana Board of Health
- Public Health Act of 1879
- Emerging infectious disease
- Ship Sanitation Certificate
- Occupational hygiene
- Yellow Fever Commission

Infectious diseases of 19th century

| Cholera | Tuberculosis |
| Scarlet fever | Typhoid fever |
| Smallpox | Yellow fever |

== Bibliography ==
- National Quarantine and Sanitary Association of the United States (1860). "Quarantine Regulations". HathiTrust Digital Library. George Rand & Avery. OCLC 14846965.
- Woodworth, John Maynard (1875). "The Cholera Epidemic of 1873 in the United States". HathiTrust Digital Library. Washington, D.C.: United States Government Printing Office. OCLC 14860044.
