= Harry A. Marmer =

Russian Empire-born American engineer, mathematician and oceanographer

- Born: June 21, 1885; Proskuriv, Russian Empire
- Died: November 5, 1953 (aged 68); Washington, D.C.
- Citizenship: United States
- Education: Rutgers University (B.S. 1907, M.S. 1931)
- Known for: Study of tides and currents
- Spouse: Hazel Ellington Dakin (1916-1953)
- Children: two
- Parent: Isaac Dove Marmer Rechoma (Segal) Marmer
- Awards: Department of Commerce Gold Medal 1949 Alexander Agassiz Medal 1951
- Scientific career
- Workplaces: U.S. Coast and Geodetic Survey (1907-1953)

Harry A. Marmer (June 21, 1885 – November 5, 1953) was a Russian-born American engineer, mathematician and oceanographer who was a career employee of the United States Coast and Geodetic Survey. He was an internationally recognized expert on tides and currents.

== Early life ==
Harry Aaron Marmer was born in Proskuriv in the Russian Empire (now Khmelnytskyi, Ukraine) on June 21, 1885, the son of Isaac Dove (or Baer) Marmer (or Marnier) and the former Rechoma Segal. He emigrated to the United States in 1889. After primary and secondary education in public schools in New Jersey, he graduated Phi Beta Kappa from Rutgers College in 1907 with a Bachelor of Science degree in engineering. After graduation, he worked as an assistant engineer for the Cape May Real Estate Company from June to November 1907.

== Career ==
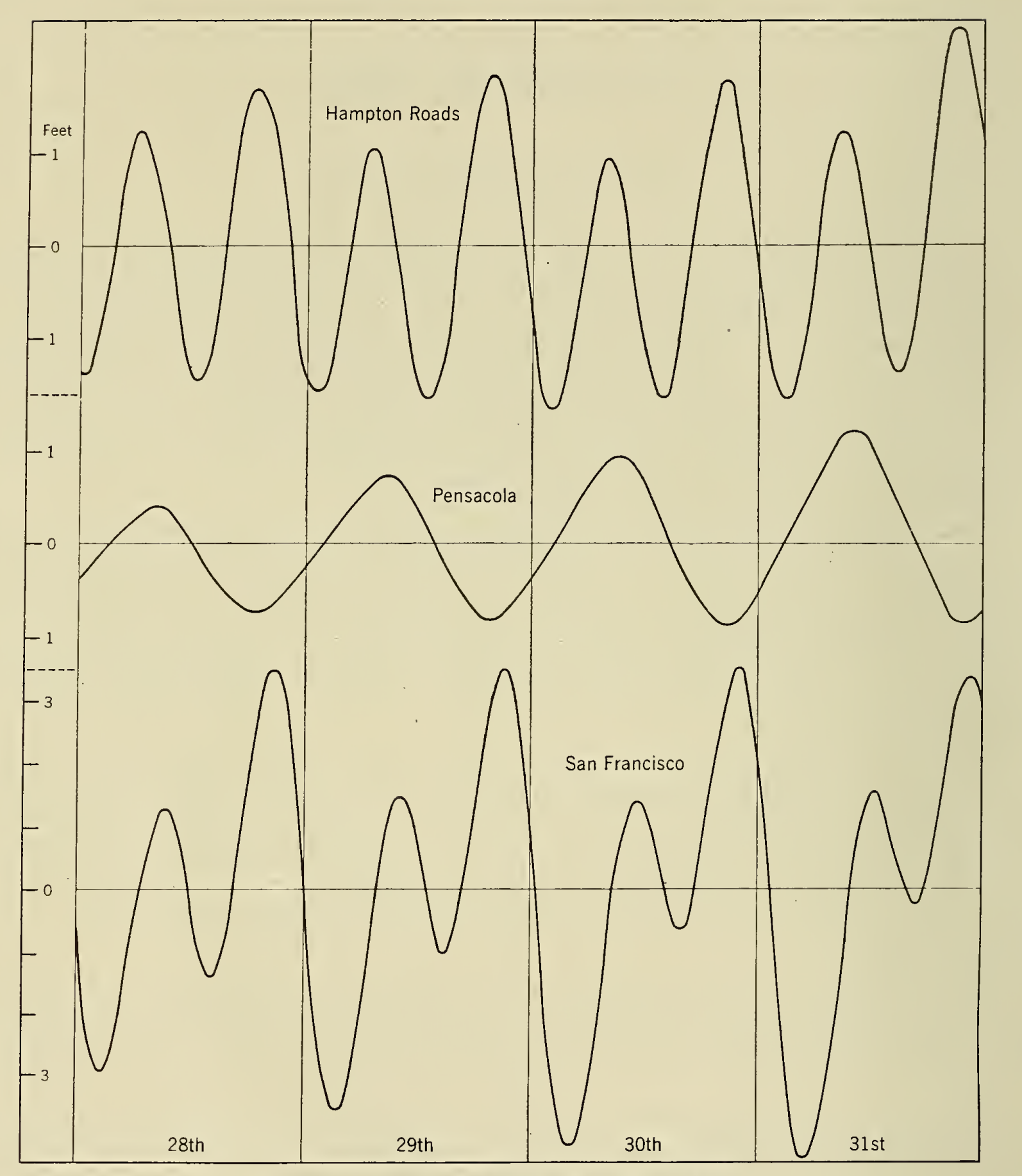
Diagram illustrating the three types of tide. Top: Semidaily; Middle: Daily; Bottom: Mixed. From Tidal Datum Planes

Leaving the real estate company, Marmer accepted a position as a mathematician with the United States Coast and Geodetic Survey's Division of Tides and Currents in 1907. He became Chief Tidal Mathematician and Chief of the Section of Field Work of the division. In 1920, he became assistant chief of the Division of Tides and Currents, a post he held until his retirement. He returned to Rutgers to earn a master's degree, which he received in 1931.

During his long career, Marmer gained international recognition as an expert on tides, currents, tidal datum planes, and related oceanographic subjects. He established tide stations in the United States, in South America, and on the islands of the Pacific Ocean, taking particular pride in the ones at the Strait of Magellan and Guadalcanal.

For the Coast and Geodetic Survey, Marmer wrote Tides and Currents in New York Harbor, Coastal Currents along the Pacific Coast of the United States, Tidal Datum Planes, and Chart Datums. He also wrote numerous articles on tides, currents, and general oceanography in various journals and magazines in the United States and other countries. He was the author of two books, The Tide and The Sea, which became standard texts on their subjects. His publications were considered so authoritative that the United States Supreme Court used them in cases involving riparian rights.

Marmer's career of nearly 46 years with the Coast and Geodetic Survey ended with his retirement at the end of August 1953.

== Awards ==
Marmer received many honors and awards during his career. One of the most significant was the Department of Commerce Gold Medal, an exceptional service award which he received "for outstanding contribution to the public service, the nation, or humanity" in a ceremony on February 14, 1949, in Washington, D.C. Another significant award was the Alexander Agassiz Medal, which he received in 1951 from the National Academy of Sciences. The Report of the National Academy of Sciences, Fiscal Year 1947-1948 cited his achievements in earning the medal as follows:

Mr. Marmer has led the program of tidal surveys along the coasts of the United States and its dependencies, and initiated the cooperative tidal program on the west coast of South America in 1941 and the tidal survey of the western Pacific islands in 1947. These projects have made available to oceanographers accurate, long-period records for large areas where previously very little observational tidal data were available. He has introduced methods of analysis and criteria which permit separation of the effects of local crustal deformation from those of eustatic changes in sea level. The program of work which he has originated will ultimately produce reliable conclusions about present-day tectonic processes and the present-day rate of change of the quantity of water in the oceans.

== Personal and professional life ==
Marmer married the former Hazel Ellison Dakin on November 16, 1916. They had two children, Kalmon E. Marmer and Nancy M. (Marmer) Thompson.

Marmer was a member of the American Association for the Advancement of Science, American Society of Civil Engineers, Association of American Geographers, American Congress on Surveying and Mapping, American Geophysical Union, Philosophical Society of Washington, United States Naval Institute, Washington Society of Professional Engineers, Cosmos Club, and Federation Club.

== Death ==
Only a few weeks after his retirement, Marmer died at George Washington University Hospital in Washington, D.C., on November 5, 1953.

== Commemoration ==
The Coast and Geodetic Survey survey ship USC&GS Marmer, which operated along the United States East Coast studying tides and currents from 1957 to 1968, was named for Marmer.
