= Public Health Reports =

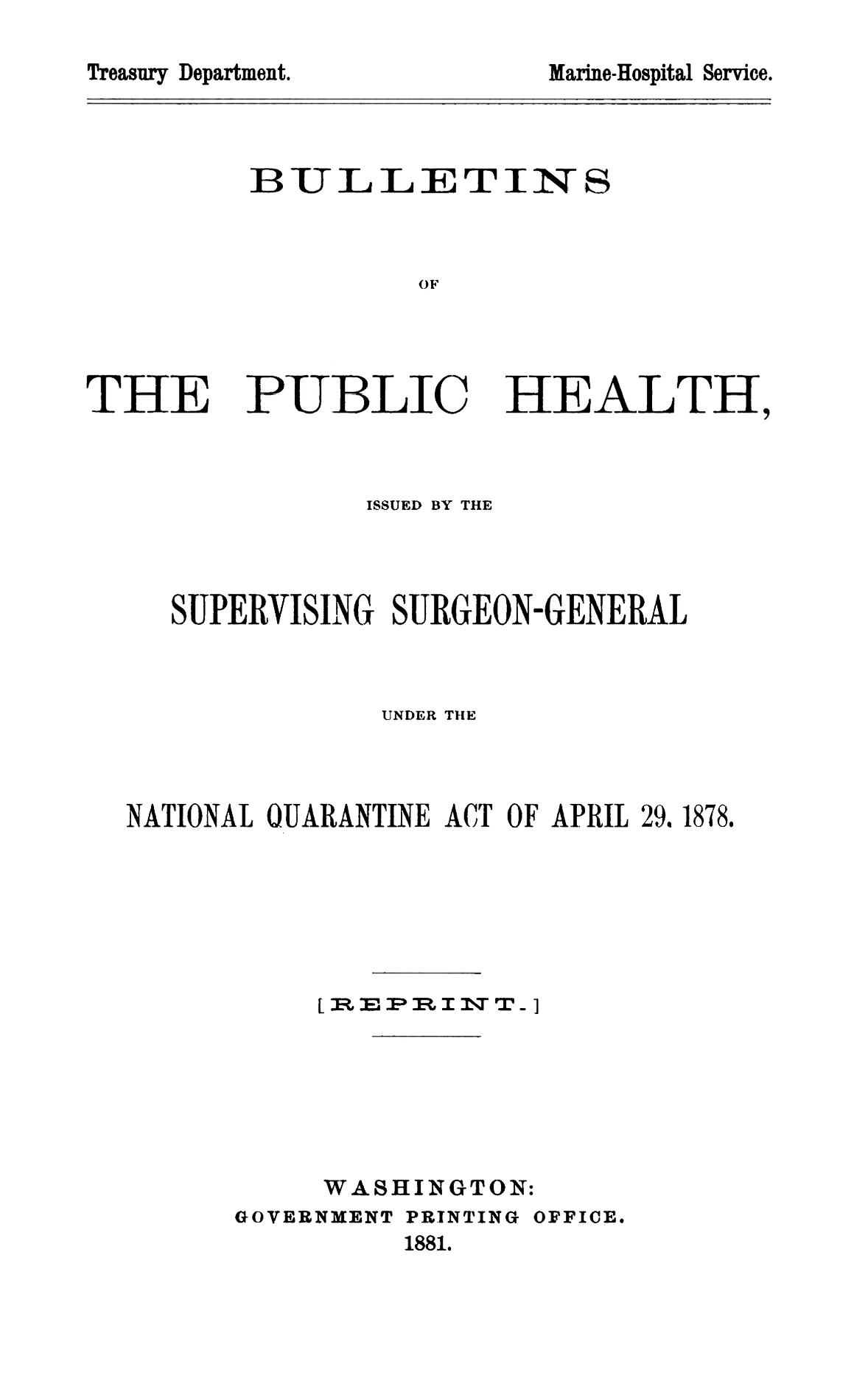
- Cover of the 1881 reprint of the first issue (published in 1878) of Bulletins of the Public Health
- Discipline: Public health
- Language: English
- Edited by: Hazel D. Dean

Publication details
- Former names: Bulletins of the Public Health, Weekly Abstract of Sanitary Reports, HSMHA Health Reports, Health Services Reports
- History: 1878–present
- Publisher: SAGE Publishing for the Association of Schools and Programs of Public Health and the United States Public Health Service
- Frequency: Bimonthly
- Open access: Delayed, after 1 year
- Impact factor: 3.3 (2022)

Standard abbreviations
- ISO 4: Public Health Rep.

Indexing
- CODEN: PHRPA6
- ISSN: 0033-3549 (print); 1468-2877 (web)
- LCCN: 75642678
- OCLC no.: 889405256

Links
- Journal homepage; Online access; Online archive; Office of the Surgeon General journal page

Public Health Reports is a peer-reviewed public health journal established in 1878 and published by SAGE Publishing for the Association of Schools and Programs of Public Health and the United States Public Health Service. The title and publication frequency of the journal has varied over the years, but it is currently published bimonthly. The editor-in-chief is Hazel D. Dean. Articles are published under a delayed open access, where they become fully open access one year after publication. Some special articles are published as open access including regularly published commentaries by the US Surgeon General and other top United States Department of Health and Human Services officials.

== History ==
The journal was established in July 1878 as the Bulletins of the Public Health under the National Quarantine Act of April 29, 1878, issued by the Supervising Surgeon-General at the time, John Maynard Woodworth. This act requested weekly reports of epidemic disease infections to be forwarded to Washington by the American consulates abroad.

Publication was suspended after 46 issues on May 24, 1879 as a byproduct of the creation of the National Board of Health and its takeover of the Quarantine Act responsibilities. During this period, the Board of Health instead published the reports in its National Board of Health Bulletin. The responsibility for the Quarantine Act returned to the Surgeon General in 1883, and in 1887 the journal resumed publication as the Weekly Abstract of Sanitary Reports.

Thus, the first volume of the journal was published in 1878 as the Bulletins of the Public Health, and volumes 2–10 were published from 1887 to 1895 as the Weekly Abstract of Sanitary Reports. From 1896 to 1970 (volumes 11–85) it was published as Public Health Reports, and then it went through two brief periods of other names (volume 86 and the first two issues of volume 87 were published as HSMHA Health Reports from 1971 to 1972, while the remainder of volume 87 to the third issue of volume 89 were published as Health Services Reports, from 1972–1974) before returning to the Public Health Reports name with the fourth issue of volume 89 in 1974. It continues to be published under the same name.

PHR was the primary source of US epidemiological data during the first part of the 20th century and was the precursor to the CDC’s Morbidity and Mortality Weekly Report (MMWR). The journal stopped publishing morbidity and mortality statistics in 1950 when these stats were transferred to MMWR. In 1952, PHR absorbed three other journals, the CDC Bulletin, the Journal of Venereal Disease Information, and Tuberculosis Control.

In January 1918, a case of influenza in Haskell County, Kansas was diagnosed by local doctor Loring Miner. Miner published about the case in the April 1918 Public Health Reports. This is believed to be the first documented case of the global influenza pandemic of 1918. Following this first publication about the global influenza pandemic of 1918, the journal published extensively about emerging viral epidemics, including about COVID-19. From 1878-2021, PHR published 349 articles on emerging viral epidemics covering such diseases as influenza, dengue, Zika, Ebola, and COVID-19. Influenza was the most discussed virus in the journal until the emergence of COVID-19. The journal issued a call for papers about COVID-19 in March 2020 which resulted in a large increase of submissions and publications on this topic.

PHR’s other impactful historic content included Josef Goldberger’s research on the etiology of pellagra.

== Editors in Chief ==
In 2023, PHR published an article titled "Editors in chief of Public Health Reports, 1878- 2022: men and women who shaped the discussion of public health practice from 1918 influenza to COVID-19". The article reconstructed, for the first time, the timeline of past PHR editors in chief (EIC) and identified women among them. PHR had 25 EIC transitions over 109 years, counting from 1913 through-2022, the period, during which a single individual in charge of the journal could be identified. Five identifiable EICs were women, who acted as EIC for about one-quarter of the journal’s traceable history. PHR’s longest serving EIC was Marian P. Tebben who served as EIC for 20 years (1974-1994). Many former PHR EIC were influential public health figures. For example, Frederic E. Shaw was a former EIC of MMWR and Hazel D. Dean was the principal deputy director of a center at the Centers for Disease Control and Prevention. Past PHR EICs included:

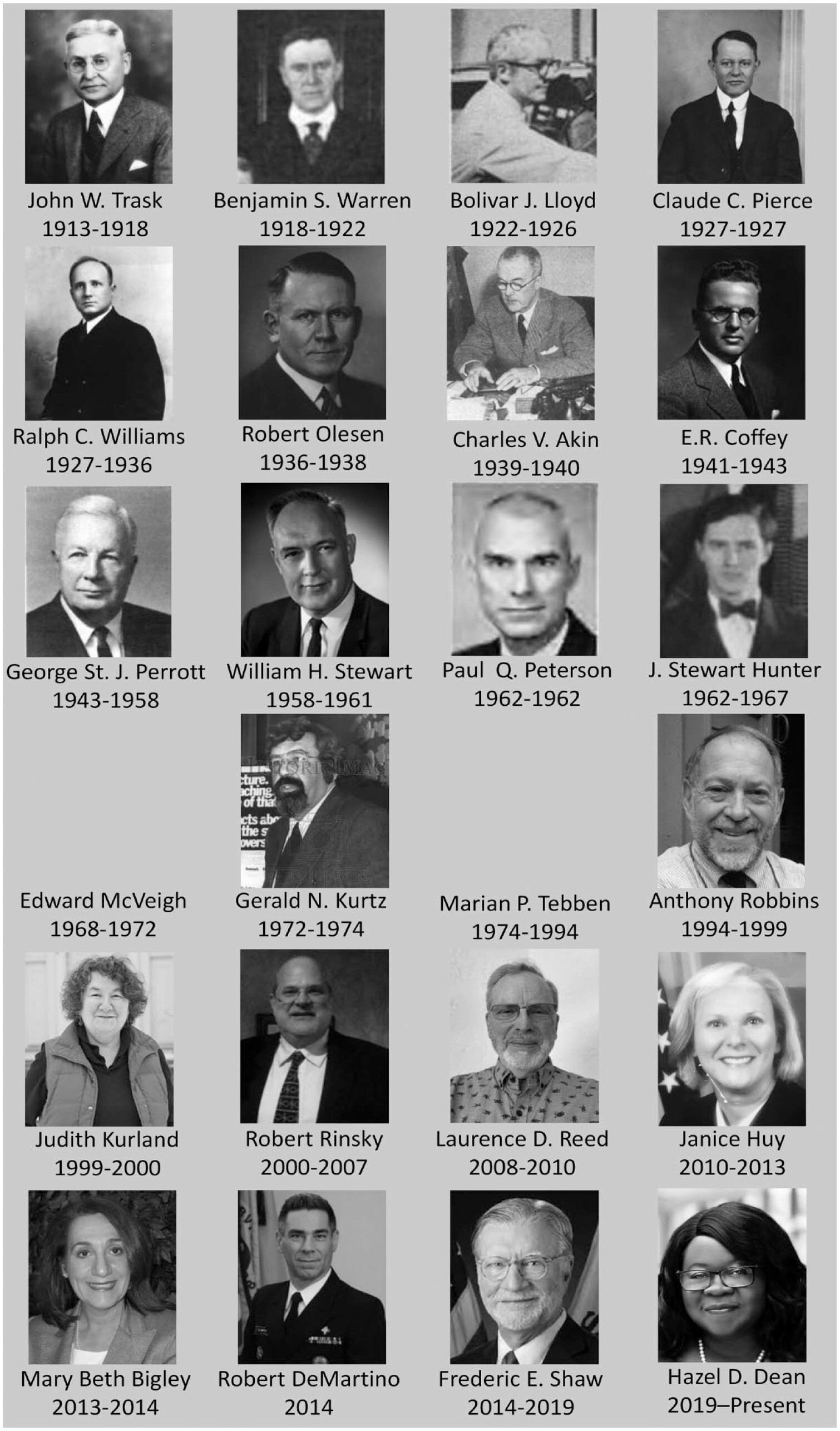
Photo collage of past Public Health Reports editors in chief, 1913-2022. Photos could not be located for Edward McVeigh and Marian P. Tebben.

- John W. Trask (January 1913-February 1918)
- Benjamin S. Warren (February 1918–May 1922)
- Bolivar J. Lloyd (September 1922–January 1926)
- Claude C. Pierce (January–September 1927)
- Ralph C. Williams (September 1927-May 1936)
- Robert Olesen (June 1936-December 1938)
- Charles V. Akin (January 1939-December 1940)
- E.R. Coffey (January 1941-December 1943)
- George St. J. Perrott (December 1943-July 1958)
- William H. Stewart (August 1958-December 1961)
- Paul Q. Peterson (January–June 1962)
- J. Stewart Hunter (July 1962-September 1967)
- George St. J. Perrott (October–December 1967)
- Edward McVeigh (January 1968-February 1972)
- Gerald N. Kurtz (March 1972-February 1974)
- Marian P. Tebben (March 1974-October 1994)
- Anthony Robbins (November 1994-February 1999)
- Judith Kurland (March 1999-August 2000)
- Robert Rinsky (September 2000-December 2007)
- Laurence D. Reed (January 2008-October 2010)
- Janice Huy (November 2010-February 2013)
- Mary Beth Bigley (March 2013-June 2014)
- Robert DeMartino (July–August 2014)
- Frederic E. Shaw (September 2014-May 2019)
- Hazel D. Dean (May 2019 – present)

== Abstracting and indexing ==
The journal is abstracted and indexed in CAB Abstracts, CINAHL, Current Contents/Social & Behavioral Sciences, Current Contents/Clinical Medicine, EBSCOhost, Embase/Excerpta Medica, Index Medicus/MEDLINE/PubMed, LexisNexis, Science Citation Index, Scopus, and the Social Sciences Citation Index. According to the Journal Citation Reports, the journal has a 2022 impact factor of 3.3.
