= USC&GS Marmer =

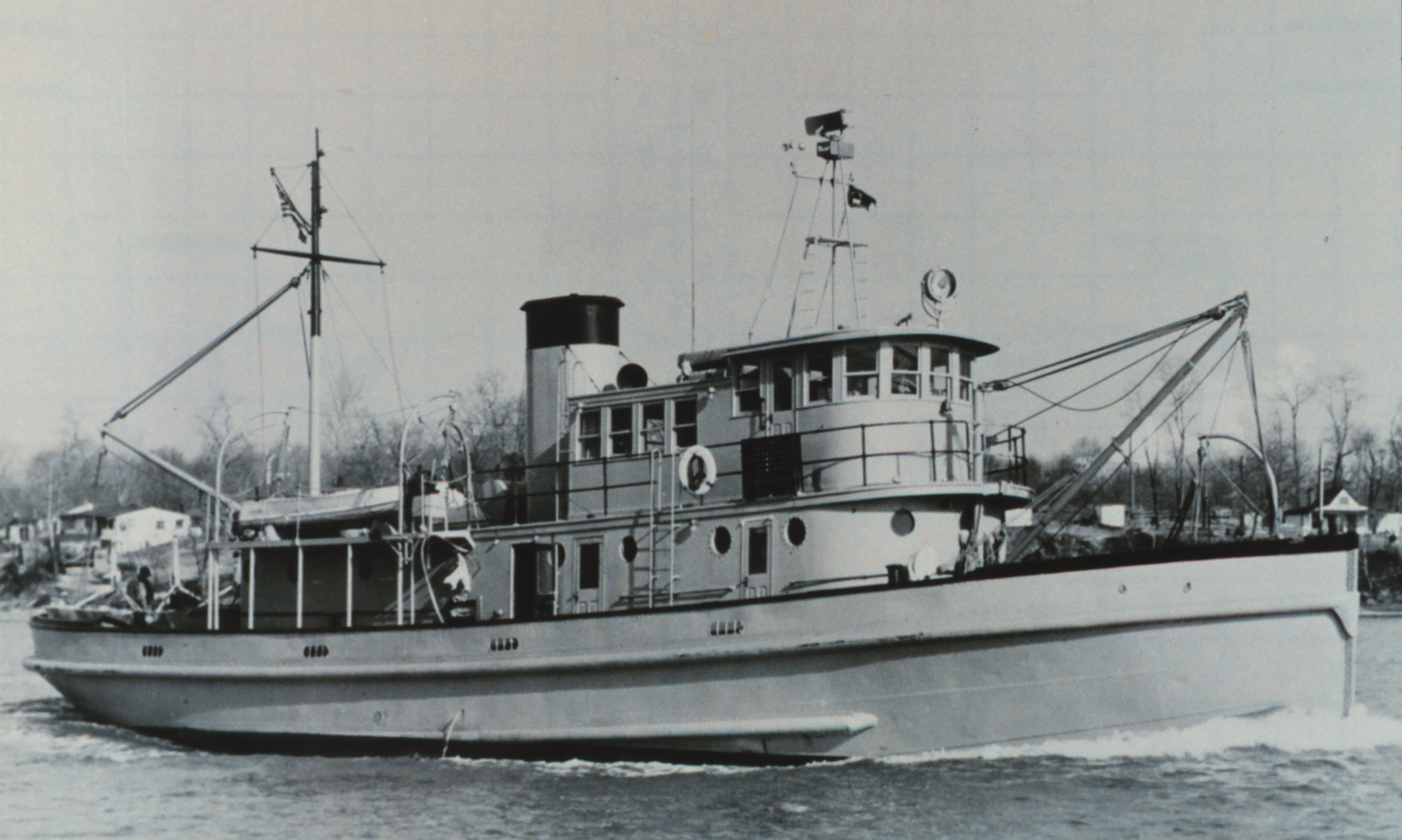
- USC&GS Marmer undergoing sea trials at Curtis Bay, Baltimore, Maryland, in the autumn of 1957 after her conversion to a survey ship.

History

U.S. Public Health Service
- Name: USPHS Walter Wyman
- Namesake: Walter Wyman (1848–1911), Surgeon General of the United States (1891–1911)
- Builder: Spedden Shipbuilding, Baltimore, Maryland
- Commissioned: 1932
- Decommissioned: 1957
- Fate: Transferred to U.S. Coast and Geodetic Survey 24 May 1957

History

U.S. Coast and Geodetic Survey
- Name: USC&GS Marmer
- Namesake: Harry A. Marmer (1885–1953), U.S. Coast and Geodetic Survey mathematician and oceanographer noted for his study of tides and currents
- Acquired: 24 May 1957
- Commissioned: 1957
- Decommissioned: 1968

General characteristics
- Type: Survey ship
- Tonnage: 196 Gross register tons
- Length: 100.7 ft (30.7 m)
- Beam: 22 ft (6.7 m)
- Draft: 10 ft (3.0 m)

USC&GS Marmer was a United States Coast and Geodetic Survey survey ship in commission from 1957 to 1968.

Prior to her Coast and Geodetic Survey career, she served as the United States Public Health Service boarding tug USPHS Walter Wyman from 1932 to 1957.

== Construction and Public Health Service career ==
Spedden Shipbuilding constructed the ship for the U.S. Public Health Service at Baltimore, Maryland, in 1932 as the boarding tug USPHS Walter Wyman. From 1932 to 1957, Walter Wyman carried Public Health Service personnel tasked with conducting shipboard health inspections to and from ships arriving in the United States. The Public Health Service retired Walter Wyman from service in 1957 and transferred her to the U.S. Coast and Geodetic Survey on 24 May 1957.

== Coast and Geodetic Survey career ==
On 27 May 1957, the Coast and Geodetic Survey renamed the vessel USC&GS Marmer. She underwent conversion to a survey ship, followed by sea trials at Curtis Bay in Baltimore in the autumn of 1957. After her successful completion of sea trials, the Coast and Geodetic Survey commissioned her later in 1957. Used for the study of currents, Marmer operated along the United States East Coast until 1968, when she was decommissioned and replaced by the auxiliary survey vessel USC&GS Ferrel (ASV 92).
