= Ship Sanitation Certificate =

A Ship Sanitation Certificate is a document that corroborates a ship's compliance with maritime sanitation and quarantine rules specified in article 39 of the International Health Regulations (2005) issued by the World Health Organization. The certificate serves as proof that the ship is free of clear sources of contagion and may be a requirement for permission of entry into port in some jurisdictions.

SSC's are issued by competent health authorities in authorized ports, after inspection. Certificates are valid for six months, revocable if evidence of health risks are found, and the ship remains liable to further inspection at all times.

Ship sanitation certificates can be of two types: Ship Sanitation Control Exemption Certificates (SSCEC) are issued to vessels that have passed inspection that verifies that the ship is free of animal vectors, potential disease reservoirs or ill humans. Ship Sanitation Control Certificates (SSCC) are issued when a health risk is found, and control measures (fumigation, etc.) have been successfully carried out.

The Ship Sanitation Certificates replaced the older Deratting Certificates in 2007.
