= An Act for the relief of sick and disabled seamen =

United States law of 1798

- Enacted by: the 5th United States Congress
- Effective: September 1, 1798

Legislative history
- Passed the House of Representatives on April 12, 1798 (Voice); Passed the Senate on July 14, 1798 (Voice); Signed into law by President John Adams on July 16, 1798

An Act for the relief of sick and disabled seamen was passed by the 5th United States Congress. It was signed by President John Adams on July 16, 1798. The act authorized the deduction of twenty cents per month from the wages of seamen for the purpose of funding medical care for sick and disabled seamen, as well as building additional hospitals for their treatment.

== Legislative history ==
The bill was introduced into the House of Representatives by a committee appointed for the purpose on February 28, 1798, and read the first and second time that day. After some consideration, the bill was referred back to committee and on April 6, 1798, an amended bill was reported to the House of Representatives and read the first and second time that day. On April 9, 1798, the bill was amended, engrossed and read the third time and on April 12, 1798, the bill was passed and sent to the Senate for concurrence.

The bill was received in the Senate on April 12, 1798, and read the first time. The bill received its second reading the following day and was referred to committee. The bill was reported from committee with amendments on June 19, 1798. The bill was amended, read the third time and passed by the Senate on July 14, 1798, and sent back to the House of Representatives for concurrence in the amendments.

The bill was received in the House of Representatives on July 14, 1798, and the Senate amendments were approved the same day. On July 16, 1798, the bill was duly enrolled and transmitted to President John Adams, who signed it into law the same day.

== Description and purpose of the legislation ==
Section one of the act directed each master of a vessel of the United States arriving from a foreign port into any port of the United States to pay to the Collector at the arrival port twenty cents per month from each seaman on board the vessel, which sum he was authorized to withhold from the wages of said seamen. Section two of the act forbid Collectors from renewing the license of vessels in the coasting trade unless the master of said vessel complied with the provisions of the act and provided a penalty of a one hundred dollar fine for a master's failure to comply. Section three of the act directed collectors to deliver funds collected under the act to the secretary of the treasury on a quarterly basis. It further authorized the president of the United States to use the funds for the treatment of sick and disabled seamen in existing hospitals and facilities. Section four of the act authorized and directed the president of the United States to use surplus funds collected under the act to build additional hospitals at the ports of the United States. Section five of the act authorized the president to appoint directors for each port, to direct the spending of funds at each port and to account for the use of said funds. The directors were appointed solely by the president and served at his pleasure.

== Legacy ==
Later commentators compared this act to the 2010 Patient Protection and Affordable Care Act, arguing that the 1798 act is the first federal individual mandate levied on individuals for health insurance. Others pointed to the fact that this law solely regulated employers engaged in interstate and foreign commerce and was enacted as a matter of national security.
