= Division of Industrial Hygiene =

Former U.S. Public Health Service division

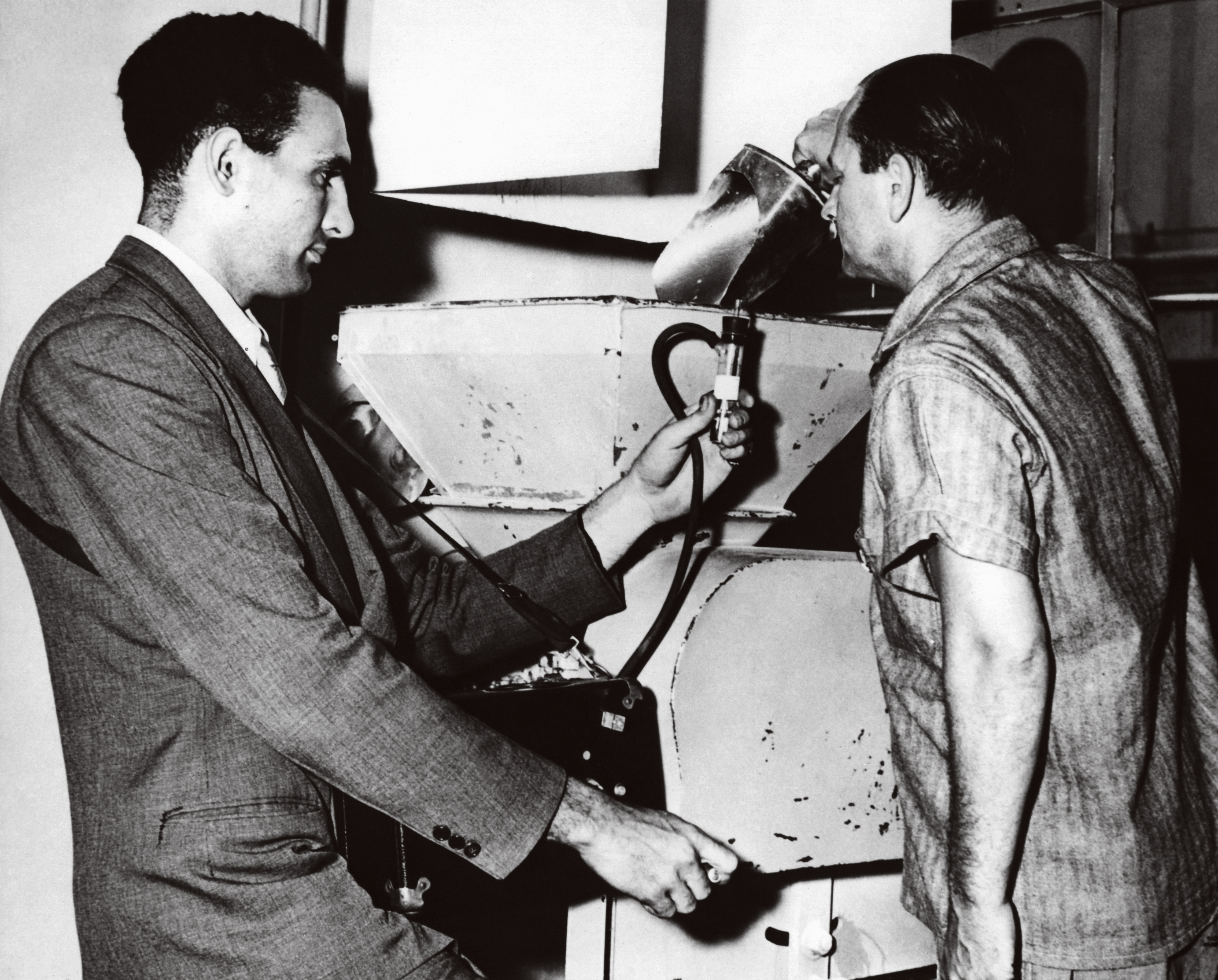
- An industrial hygienist takes an air sample in the breathing zone of an industrial worker in 1951.

Agency overview
- Formed: 1914; 112 years ago
- Dissolved: 1971; 55 years ago
- Superseding agency: National Institute for Occupational Safety and Health
- Jurisdiction: Federal government of the United States
- Headquarters: Pittsburgh (1914–1918) Washington, D.C. (1918–1938, 1947–1966) Bethesda, Maryland (1938–1947) Cincinnati (1967–1968; field headquarters 1950–1971) Rockville, Maryland (1968–1971)
- Parent agency: Hygienic Laboratory (1914–1918) Division of Scientific Research (1919–1937); National Institute of Health (1937–1943); Bureau of State Services (1943–1966); National Center for Urban and Industrial Health (1967–1968); Environmental Control Administration (1968–1970) Health Services and Mental Health Administration (1970–1971)

Footnotes
- Names Office of Field Investigations into Occupational Diseases (1914–1917); Office of Industrial Hygiene and Sanitation (1919–1937); Division of Industrial Hygiene (1937–1951); Division of Occupational Health (1951–1953, 1960–1966); Occupational Health Program (1953–1960, 1967–1968) Bureau of Occupational Safety and Health (1968–1971)

The Division of Industrial Hygiene was a division of the U.S. Public Health Service (PHS) with responsibility for occupational safety and health programs. It existed from 1914 until 1971, when it became the National Institute for Occupational Safety and Health (NIOSH). It had several names during its existence, most notably the Office of Industrial Hygiene and Sanitation in its earlier years and the Division of Occupational Health during its later years.

It was established as a result of Progressive Era concerns for the conditions of workers, with the goal of providing scientific responses to hazards faced in the workplace. It was headquartered for its first few years in the Pittsburgh U.S. Marine Hospital, and moved to Washington, D.C. in 1918. Its responsibilities expanded during World War I, and during the 1920s its functions grew to include broad field studies integrating environmental analyses of hazards in workplaces with medical analyses of workers' health.

In 1937, it became a division of the National Institute of Health. The following year the Industrial Hygiene Laboratory, the first building built solely for the study of industrial hygiene in the U.S., opened as one of the first three buildings of the new NIH campus. The outbreak of World War II caused a shift away from field investigations to direct services to the U.S. Army Ordnance Department and state agencies to keep workers safe for war production, as well as an increase in laboratory research and development of analytical instrumentation.

The Division was moved into the new Bureau of State Services in 1943 as part of a reorganization of PHS, although the laboratory research programs were split off and remained in NIH. In 1950, its field operations moved to Cincinnati to co-locate with the PHS Environmental Health Center already established there. During the 1950s, its funding and activities were greatly reduced, and it was downgraded from division status, but in 1960 it was restored as a division and began to grow again.

An effort to build support for a national occupational health program culminated in the 1965 Frye Report, which recommended that the Division be given specific legislative authority and increased funding. However, the PHS reorganizations of 1966–1973 were particularly turbulent for occupational health programs, as the organization passed through seven operating agencies and bore four names during this time. Nevertheless, the Federal Coal Mine Health and Safety Act of 1969 give PHS national responsibility for medical research and examinations, its first legislatively mandated activity in occupational health. The Occupational Safety and Health Act of 1970 created NIOSH from the former Division.

== Origins ==
=== Background ===
The Public Health Service first became involved with industrial hygiene during the Progressive Era, when concern for the conditions of workers arose in response to the increasing industrialization and urbanization that had occurred since the late 19th century. Before and during World War I, an increasing number of synthetic products were developed whose manufacture exposed workers to new toxins, increasing specialization of workers as part of an assembly line meant that an illness of one worker caused a greater loss of efficiency. This led to an increase in scientific research and interventions, as well as regulation by state factory inspection bureaus.

Increasing federal involvement in workplace safety included the creation of the U.S. Bureau of Mines (USBM) in 1910 in response to the 1907 Monongah mining disaster, and the Department of Labor in 1913. PHS collaborated with USBM between 1910 and 1914 on studies of silicosis among miners, and in 1913 performed a study of worker health at U.S. Steel. During this period, public health as a whole had been revolutionized by advances in bacteriology and the study of communicable diseases. During the 1910s and 1920s, PHS would pioneer the application of scientific analysis to industrial chemical poisonings and dust diseases. However, the federal response to worker health problems was limited to conducting and disseminating research, with regulatory responsibility belonging to state and local public health agencies.

=== Establishment ===
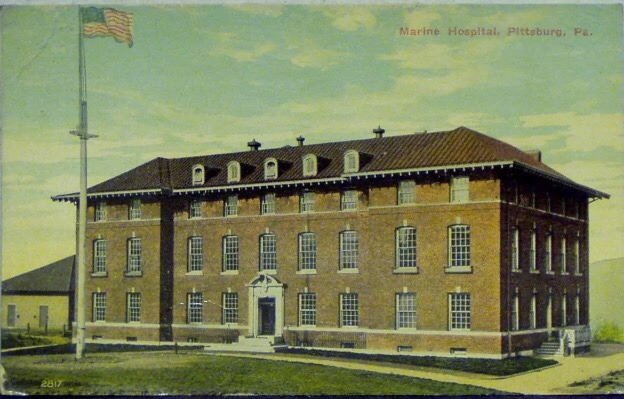
The U.S. Marine Hospital in Pittsburgh was the first home of the Office during 1915–1918.

The 1912 PHS law (Pub. L. 62–265) expanded PHS's mission from communicable into non-communicable diseases. The Office of Field Investigations into Occupational Diseases was established in 1914 as part of the PHS Division of Scientific Research, administratively within its Hygienic Laboratory. In 1917, it was renamed the Office of Field Investigations in Industrial Sanitation.

In 1915, the Pittsburgh U.S. Marine Hospital became its first home. Laboratories for chemistry, physiology, and bacteriology were constructed on the building's second floor, and a physical laboratory on the ground floor, all in the northwest wing of the building. It was the first laboratory for scientific investigation of occupational health in the United States. Its location was likely due to proximity to the recently established Bruceton Research Center of USBM, enhancing cooperation on miners' health. In addition, there were no suitable laboratory facilities in Washington, D.C., as the Hygienic Laboratory at the time only conducted biological and not environmental investigations.

Prior to World War I, the Office's staff consisted of about 12 commissioned medical officers plus additional clerical assistants. The Office's initial studies were in the New York garment industry, the Youngstown, Ohio steel industry, various industries of Cincinnati, and mining in Joplin, Missouri. Epidemiological studies of miners in Oklahoma, Kansas, and Missouri were seminal in the scientific study and control of occupational diseases. Additionally, the Office assisted the U.S. Bureau of Standards in creating a National Gas Safety Code by performing laboratory studies to determine a "toxic limit" for carbon monoxide.

The responsibilities of the Office expanded during World War I. Its new activities included sanitation and surgical services for the U.S. Explosive Plant at Nitro, West Virginia, and studies of medical facilities and worker healthcare in 170 war manufacturing plants for TNT, tetryl, picric acid, war gases, and other materials, as well as in shell loading plants. Other studies during the war covered lead poisoning in the pottery industry, health hazards in the glass and chemical industries, industrial fatigue, plant illumination, and the physiological effects of high temperature and humidity. During the war, the Office often performed field studies to provide individualized recommendations for a particular workplace, though it did not issue general recommendations.

== Washington, D.C. era ==
The Office relocated to Washington, D.C. in October 1918. From July 1918 to October 1919, the Office was reconstituted as the Division of Industrial Hygiene and Medicine within the Department of Labor, returning to PHS afterwards as a constituent part of the Division of Scientific Research. On July 1, 1919, it was renamed the Office of Industrial Hygiene and Sanitation.

There were still no laboratory facilities for industrial hygiene in Washington, so technical staff was assigned to various academic institutions, such as Yale and Johns Hopkins University, and to USBM. Temporary field offices were set up in New York, Philadelphia, Pittsburgh, Cleveland, St. Louis, and Chicago. During this period, PHS facilities in Washington, D.C. consisted of the Butler Building and Temporary Building C, until it moved to the new Public Health Service Building in May 1933. Additionally, the Old Naval Observatory housed the campus of the Hygienic Laboratory, which in 1930 became the National Institute of Health.

=== Early activities ===
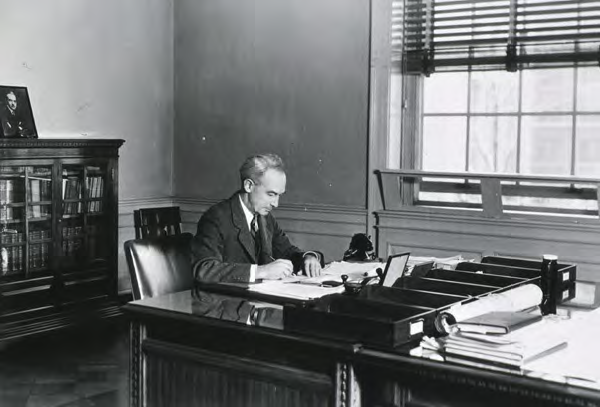
Lewis Ryers Thompson was Chief of the Office of Industrial Hygiene and Sanitation during the 1920s. He later led the Division of Scientific Research, National Institute of Health, and Bureau of State Services while the Office or Division of Industrial Hygiene was part of those agencies.

In the 1920s, the Office shifted from individualized wartime field studies to broader field studies intended for wide publication to other occupational health experts, and also grew beyond clinical studies of workers to include study of factors in the work environment. Its projects included evaluating hazards and developing ventilation design specifications for the Holland Tunnel, as well as studies to determine health effects and develop engineering controls for dusts of silica, marble, asbestos, and coal. These studies involved the first use of the Greenburg–Smith impinger for dust sampling, and included the first epidemiological study of the pulmonary effects of coal mine dust.

The Office conducted medical examinations of U.S. Bureau of Standards employees who were exposed to radium, produced one of the earliest documented reports on heat stress, and conducted early studies of community air pollution. The Office also facilitated the start of industrial hygiene departments in the individual states. Another effort was the development of cyanogen chloride as a safer alternative to hydrogen cyanide as a fumigant.

The Office led a 1925–1926 study on the health effects of tetraethyl lead in gasoline to propose regulations covering its manufacture, blending, mixing, and distribution, as well as precautions for automobile garages, repair shops, service stations, and filling stations. These proposals were voluntarily adopted by tetraethyl lead manufacturers, and remained in use (with modifications) for decades. The tetraethyl lead study has been called the culmination of industrial hygiene's development as a scientific field: integrating both environmental and clinical analyses to provide objective technical information, rather than directly advocating for regulatory or policy changes. This approach would persist until World War II.

=== Great Depression ===
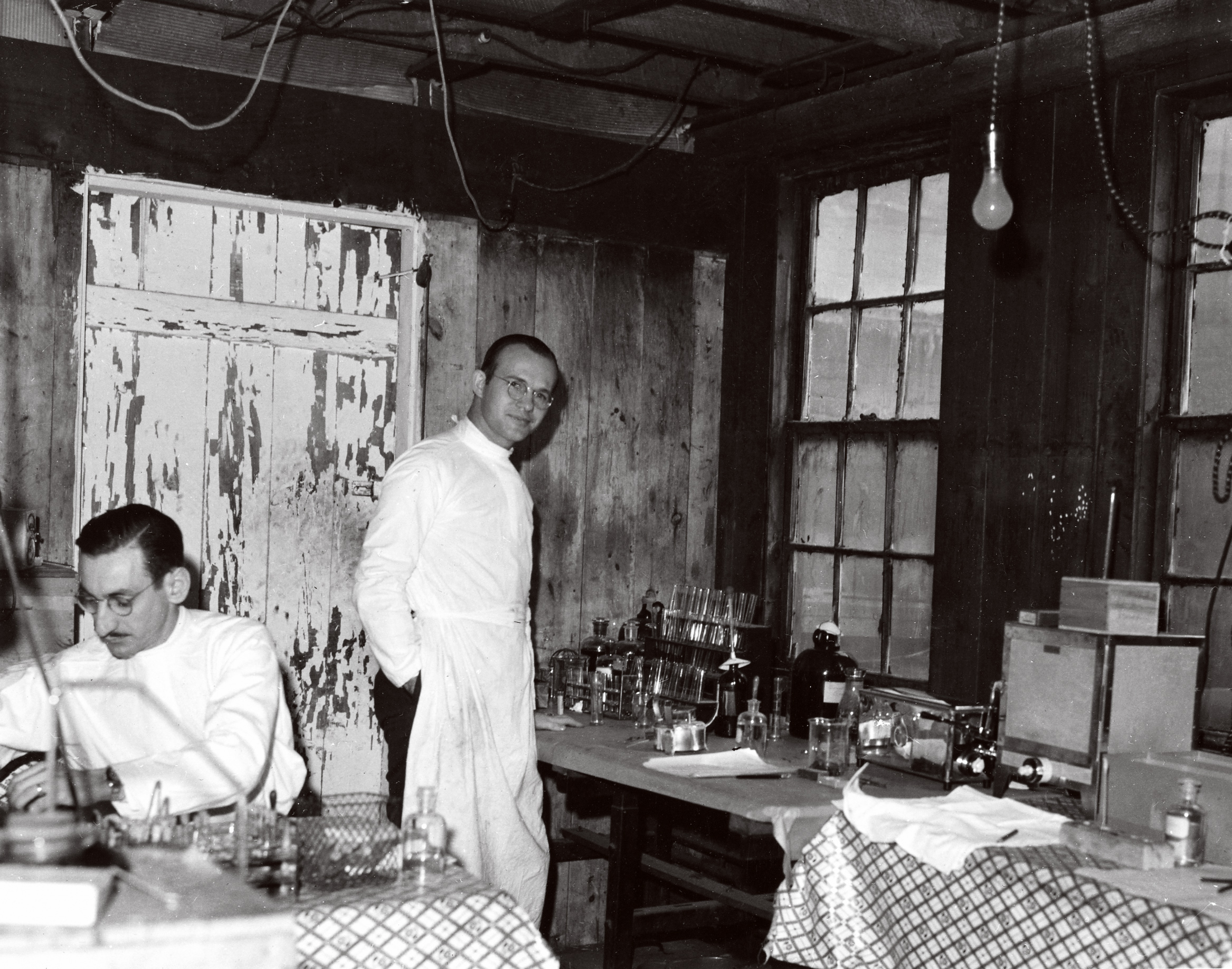
PHS scientific investigators working in their makeshift laboratory during the 1937–1938 industrial hygiene study of mercury exposure and its health effects in the hatmaking industry

The onset of the Great Depression brought almost a complete cessation of field investigations. However, after the 1934 Hawks Nest Tunnel disaster, in which many workers died of silicosis, the Office's prior studies were instrumental in state governments establishing hygienic standards for silica dust. Also, a study of mercury poisoning in the felt hat industry led to its outlawing as a carroting agent and its substitution with a non-toxic substance. The Division also began offering training courses in 1936. Nevertheless, other occupational diseases were considered to be low-incidence or non-disabling, and received less attention from public health officials than sanitation and communicable diseases.

The formation of the Division of Labor Standards within the Department of Labor in 1934 led to competition between the two agencies over whether a regulatory or advisory agency should coordinate state and local industrial hygiene agencies, with PHS emphasizing its role as a non-partisan provider of scientific data, while the Department of Labor actively advocated for labor unions' efforts to improve work conditions. The Social Security Act of 1935 provided funds that PHS used for seed grants for state industrial hygiene agencies; an early project was a 15-state industrial hygiene survey. Before 1936, only five state health departments had industrial hygiene units, but by 1938, 24 states had established offices using Social Security Act funds, and by 1949 only three states would lack such units. This expansion of industrial hygiene in state health departments often came at the expense of state labor departments, as the Department of Labor did not have its own grantmaking authority for state governments, and a 1939 attempt to give them this authority failed.

As of 1937, the South Building of the National Institute of Health's campus at the Old Naval Observatory was being renovated for the Office's use, although at the time the Office was not part of NIH.

== At the National Institute of Health ==
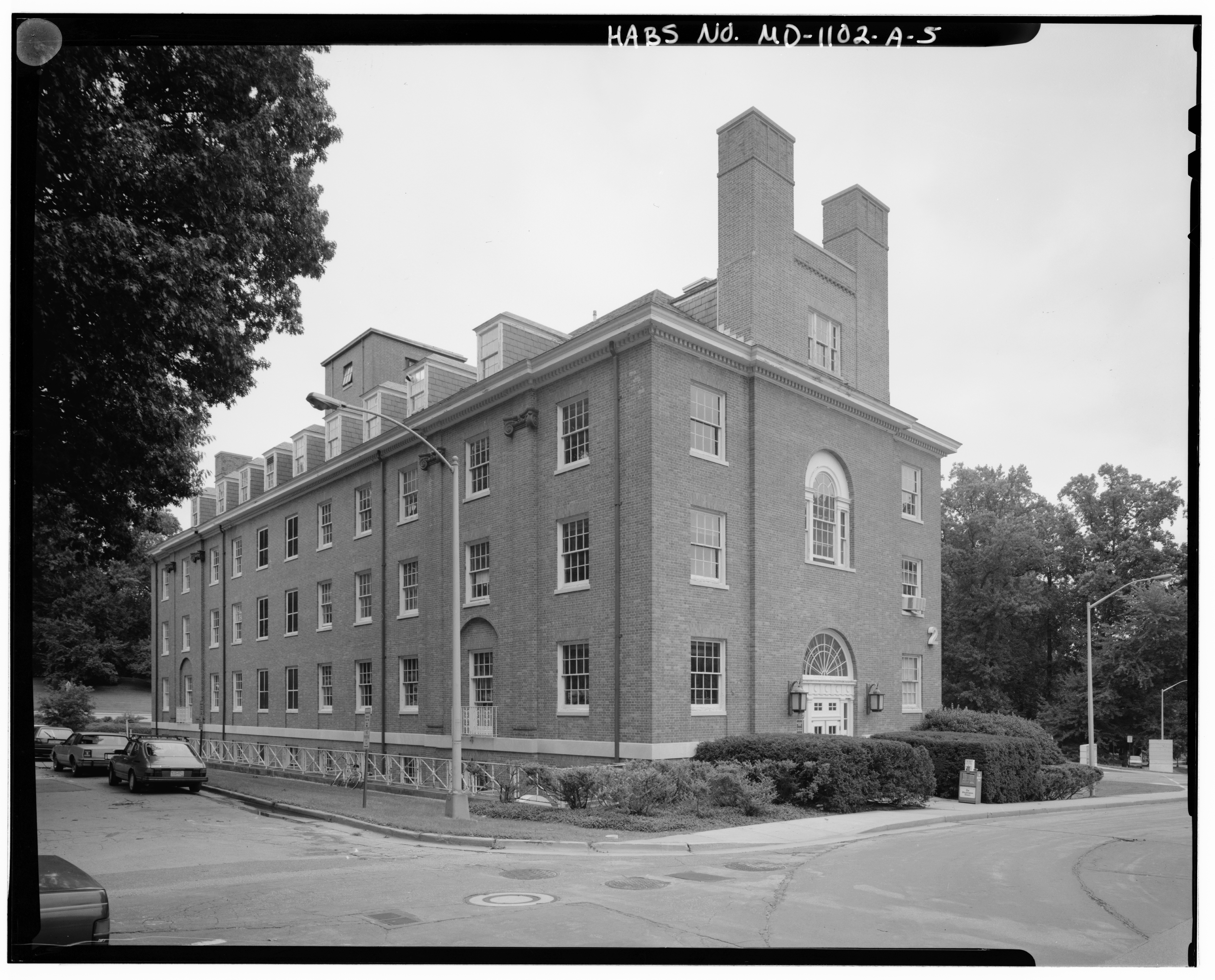
The Industrial Hygiene Laboratory, now NIH Building 2

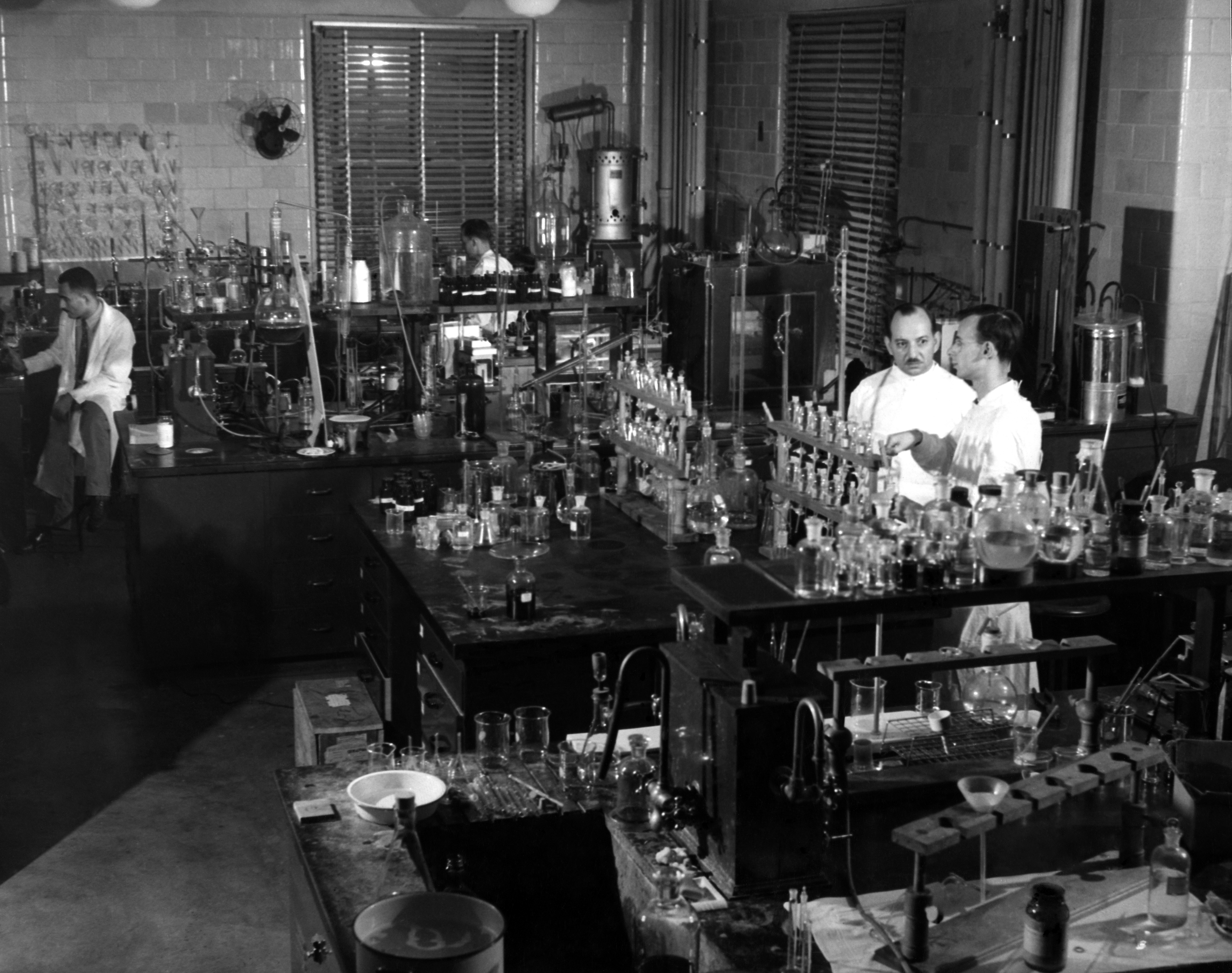
Sample analysis laboratory in the building in 1943

In 1937, the National Institute of Health (NIH) absorbed the rest of the Division of Scientific Research. At the same time the Office of Industrial Hygiene and Sanitation was combined with the Office of Dermatoses Investigations, which had existed since 1931, to form the Division of Industrial Hygiene within NIH. When NIH moved to its new campus in Bethesda, Maryland in 1938, one of its first three buildings was the Industrial Hygiene Laboratory, now known as Building 2. It was the first building built solely for the study of industrial hygiene in the United States. As of 1938, the Division had 59 industrial hygiene specialists.

Lewis Ryers Thompson, who had been Chief of the Office of Industrial Hygiene and Sanitation during the 1920s, became the NIH Director in 1937. During his tenure as NIH Director and later Chief of the Bureau of State Services, he emphasized industrial hygiene as the emerging core of public health efforts. In 1939, Olive M. Whitlock became the first industrial nurse to work for the United States federal government, and authored a report making recommendations on the recruitment and core duties of industrial nurses. In 1940, the Division began publishing the Industrial Hygiene Newsletter, which served as a communication forum between federal, state, industry, and labor professionals and programs. During the 1940s, Division Chief J. G. Townsend and Assistant Chief John J. Bloomfield focused on accelerating occupational toxicology studies, especially of newer synthetic chemicals.

=== World War II ===
"Save a Day", a 1941 film about the Division of Industrial Hygiene

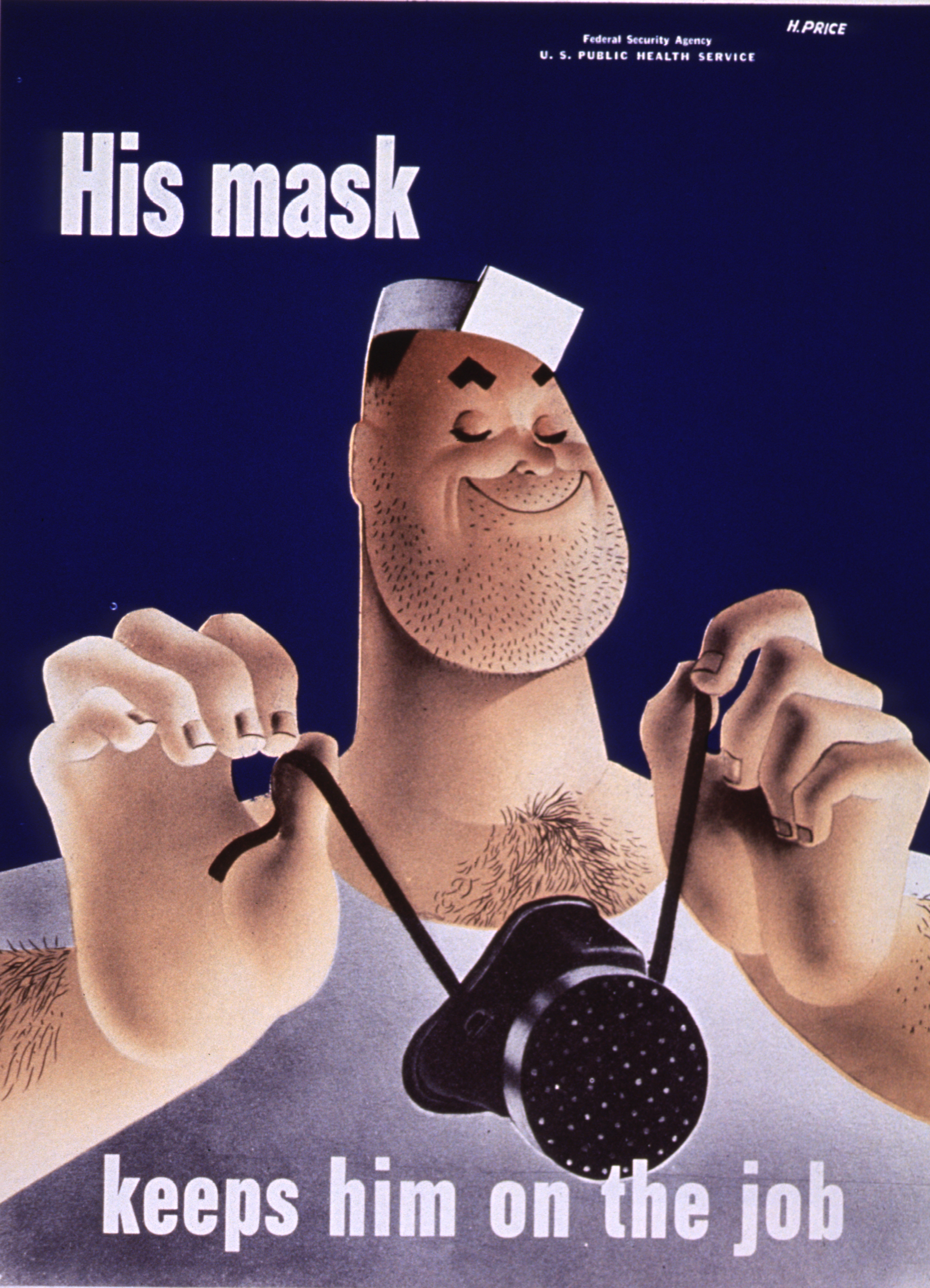
A 1942 poster from the Division of Industrial Hygiene, part of a series of nine posters

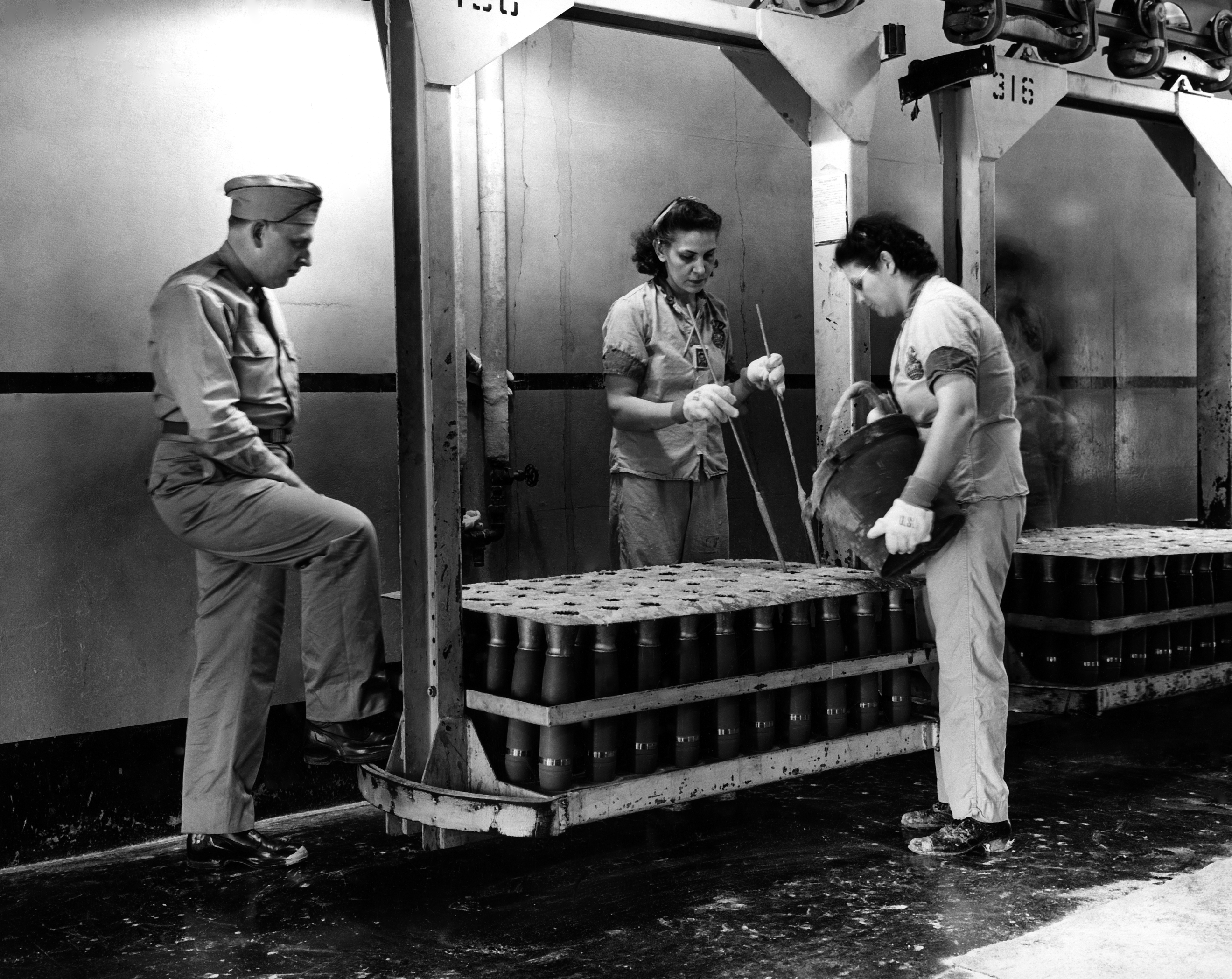
PHS dermatologist Donald Birmingham observes two ordnance workers pour TNT into mortar shells at the Ravenna Ordnance Plant in 1943.

The outbreak of World War II caused a shift away from field investigations towards direct services to the U.S. Army Ordnance Department and state agencies. During this period, productivity was of paramount concern, and worker health was considered important to the nation's productive capacity. Industrial workers were considered to be vital to victory in the war, leading to increased resources for research and interventions to support their health. Between 1939 and 1943 the Division grew from a professional staff of fewer than 30 individuals into a staff of about 125, of whom 68 were commissioned officers. At its height during this period, the Division had over 200 employees.

A significant program was the prevention of TNT poisoning and other diseases at government-owned, contractor-operated arsenals manufacturing TNT, RDX, tetryl, smokeless powder, and tracer materials, as well as practices in bomb and shell loading plants. The Division organized industrial hygiene teams to be present in arsenals to oversee worker health. This program was much more successful than its World War I predecessor, and there were only 22 reported deaths from TNT poisoning in the United States during World War II.

The Division's laboratory research activities supported the TNT field investigations, and also included studies of other toxic gases and dusts present in factories. Toxicological studies were performed on toluene, vanadium, beryllium, manganese, vinyl cyanide, and lead azide. Other objects of study were the health effects of lighting and ventilation, industrial dermatitis and melanosis, the effects of the agricultural insecticide lead arsenate, and the analysis of statistical data on occupational disease incidences and work days lost to illness. Additionally, the Division operated a grant program for states to purchase industrial hygiene equipment and employ personnel. It also performed air pollution studies in Los Angeles, determining that its smog was primarily the result of industrial pollution.

Many of these studies required the staff to develop new analytic methods and instrumentation. These included new spectroscopy methods to detect toxic substances in air and body fluids, including a spectrometer built by Frederick S. Brackett containing two of the largest natural quartz prisms in the world. Another innovation was a portable colorimeter to measure carbon monoxide in the blood of truck drivers. In addition, studies were performed using a pressure chamber to simulate and research the effects of low pressure on pilots.

=== Transfer to Bureau of State Services ===
In 1943, PHS reorganized into three top-level bureaus into which the Divisions were placed. Townsend and Bloomfield wanted to refocus on promoting state programs supported by field investigations, while NIH decided to limit its programs strictly to research. The Division of Industrial Hygiene was thus moved into the new Bureau of State Services, with the research programs split off and remaining in NIH as the Industrial Hygiene Laboratory. The Division's laboratory support facilities relocated to NIH Building T-8.

The end of World War II caused a decrease in the funding and size of the Division, coinciding with decreased public interest and engagement with worker health. In 1947, the Division moved its administrative offices from Bethesda to the Federal Security Building—South in Washington, D.C. The same year, the NIH Industrial Hygiene Laboratory was renamed the Laboratory of Physical Biology and refocused on basic research in biological chemistry and physics, with industrial hygiene investigations moved back to the Division of Industrial Hygiene. (The Laboratory of Physical Biology was soon made part of the Experimental Biology and Medicine Institute, predecessor of the National Institute of Arthritis and Musculoskeletal and Skin Diseases, and existed until around 2001–2002.) By 1949, the Division's staff had dwindled to 32.

During the immediate postwar period, the Division stationed industrial hygiene specialists in some PHS regional offices. This program was ended in 1948, and the Division reacted by creating a field station in Salt Lake City with an initial staff of four on the grounds of the former Fort Douglas, which was donated by the University of Utah. In 1947, the Division began investigating bronchogenic carcinoma in the chromate industry. The Division also performed a major study of the deadly 1948 Donora smog incident, involving a multidisciplinary 25-person team interviewing 1,500 families and testing more than 4,000 air samples.

== Cincinnati era ==
=== Move and downsizing ===
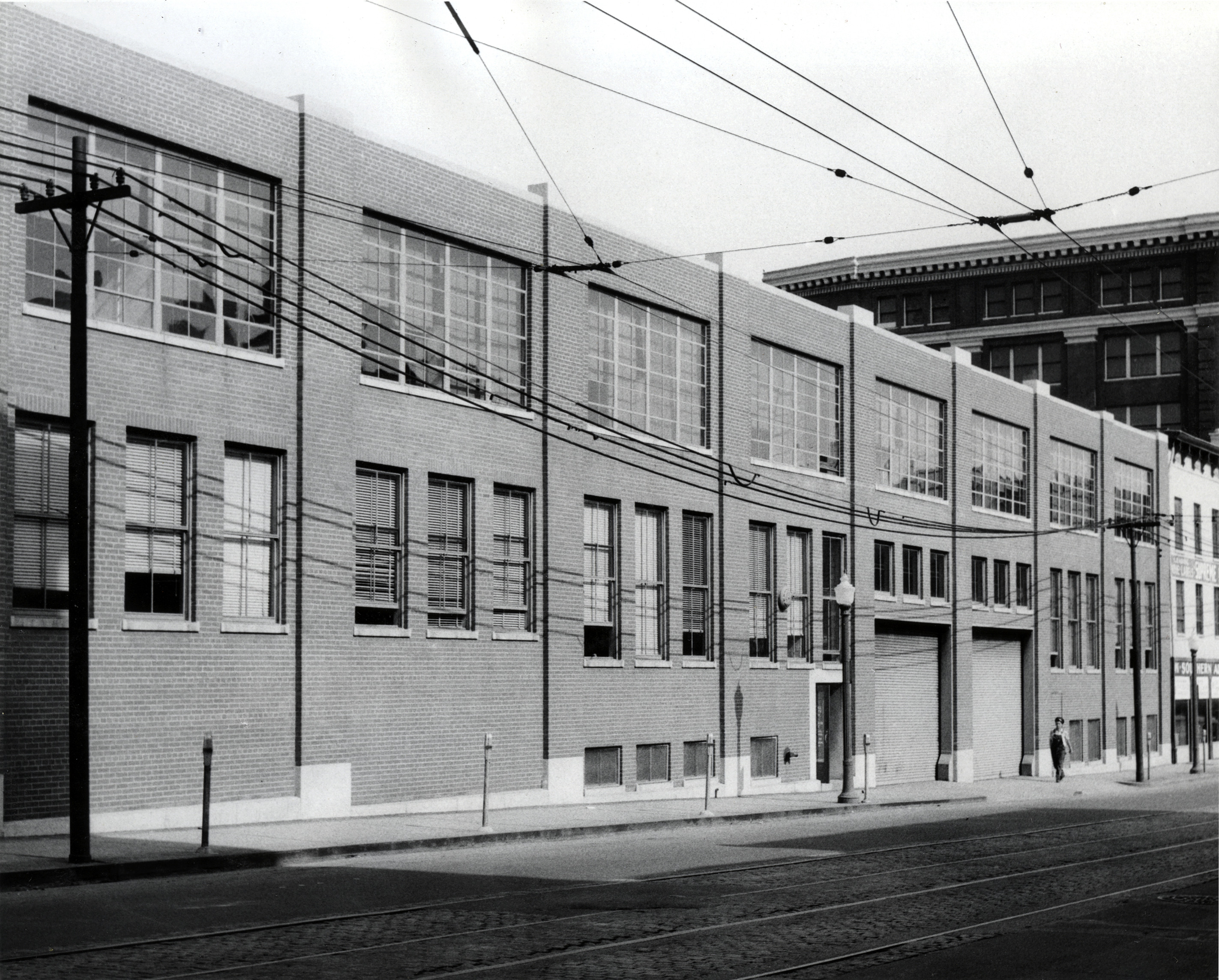
Field Headquarters at 1014 Broadway in Downtown Cincinnati in the early 1950s. The site is now occupied by the western end of the Hard Rock Casino Cincinnati.

The Division's Industrial Hygiene Newsletter ended publication in 1953 due to severe budget cuts. This cover shows a lathe operator using an industrial flamethrower to seal the end of a radio tube to illustrate an article on noxious fumes in the workplace.

In 1950, the Division's main field headquarters moved to a converted warehouse in Cincinnati at 1014 Broadway. NIH funded the renovation of the building to serve as the Division's new Field Headquarters. The increased space allowed the Division to restart laboratory research interrupted by World War II, and facilitated consultative services to industrial regions in the Midwestern United States. The administrative offices remained in Washington, D.C.

Cincinnati was already home of the PHS Environmental Health Center, which originated from the water pollution research station established in 1913 in the former Cincinnati U.S. Marine Hospital building, and had expanded into air, industrial, chemical pollution and radiological health research during and after World War II. Although the Division had considered occupying other vacant Marine Hospital buildings in various cities, the Environmental Health Center already leased space on the second floor of 1014 Broadway and it was more economical to occupy the rest of the building than to utilize space elsewhere.

Seward E. Miller succeeded Townsend as Division Chief in 1951. He sought to broaden the Division by expanding into occupational medicine and psychiatry, and made an unsuccessful proposal to establish a National Institute of Occupational Health. The Division's name was changed to the Division of Occupational Health in late 1951. However, the 1950s were a period in which occupational health did not attract national attention as a major concern, continuing a trend that had begun with the end of World War II. In 1951, funding for grants to states was ended. In 1953–1954, severe budget cuts caused the end of programs in absenteeism, industrial health and medicine, occupational psychiatry, and states relations, as well as publication of the Industrial Hygiene Newsletter. The Program largely changed focus from investigative research to health services research, reflecting the growth of private health and life insurance.

Also in 1953, the Bureau of State Services' programs were realigned into a smaller number of larger divisions. The Division of Occupational Health was demoted to become the Occupational Health Program within the new Division of Special Health Services, along with the other programs in chronic and non-communicable diseases, with Miller leading the combined division. The four divisions of the Environmental Health Center were instead combined into the Division of Sanitary Engineering Services, which moved in 1954 from the former Marine Hospital to the newly constructed Robert A. Taft Sanitary Engineering Center, named for the recently deceased Senator Robert A. Taft. Initial plans called for the construction of a second building adjacent to the Taft Center for the Division of Occupational Health, but this was cancelled in 1953. Another proposal to move it to a new building or buildings on the Taft Center campus was made in 1958, but scrapped in 1960.

In the mid-1950s, the Program's major field investigations were on silicosis in the metal mining industry, lung cancer in uranium miners, and hearing loss among prison workers. The silicosis program in particular was the result of a 1955 Congressional appropriation, and its success would lead to further funding increases. A program in ergonomics began in 1959. Through the 1950s, the Program generally had around 70–85 budgeted positions.

=== Expansion ===
"The Hidden Hazards", a 1963 film about the Division of Occupational Health

In 1960, the Program once again became the Division of Occupational Health. It was made part of the new Environmental Health Divisions unit, one of two units of the Bureau of State Services, which also contained the other PHS divisions in Cincinnati. This coincided with an increase in funding, as House Appropriations Committee Chairman John Fogarty was interested in industrial safety and health, and as the silicosis studies had been well received. During this time, the program in coal pneumoconiosis was greatly expanded. In 1964, the Division's major activities included hazards in uranium mines, silicosis in metal mines, industrial noise, hazards to animal feed mill workers, dermatology, toxicology, and morbidity and mortality studies, as well as training, grantmaking and providing technical assistance to other agencies and organizations. The Division grew from 87 staff in 1960 to 220 in 1964.

A 1962 report recommended moving the Environmental Health Divisions, including the Division of Occupational Health, from Cincinnati to a new facility in Washington, D.C., as the report committee considered the Taft Center to be inadequate for its recommended expansions of activities, and Cincinnati to have difficulties in attracting scientific personnel and to be too far from the facilities of other federal agencies. However, this recommendation was never carried out.

Under the leadership of Murray C. Brown, there was an effort to build support for a national occupational health program, as the Division had existed without any specific legislative authority since its establishment 50 years prior. He enlisted Louisiana State University Medical Center Chancellor William W. Frye to develop a special report to set national goals for occupational health and make program recommendations. The report, entitled "Protecting the Health of Eighty Million Americans—A National Goal for Occupational Health", was submitted as a special report to the Surgeon General on November 19, 1965. The report stated that "The Division of Occupational Health has the leadership and skills upon which an effective, imaginative national program can be built... The Division needs only the legislative authority and funds to extend its existing activities and to assume effective responsibility for areas of need identified for many years." All of its 17 program recommendations were eventually implemented. At the same time, President Lyndon B. Johnson took interest in workplace hazards and began integrating the topic into his speeches beginning in May 1966, and in 1968 he would propose the first version of the legislation that would later become the Occupational Safety and Health Act.

=== As part of the Environmental Control Administration ===
The PHS reorganizations of 1966–1973 were particularly turbulent for occupational health, as the organization would pass through seven operating agencies and bear four names during this time. In January 1967, the first wave of the reorganizations broke up the Bureau of State Services into three components, and the Division became the Occupational Health Program of the National Center for Urban and Industrial Health, which was part of the Bureau of Disease Prevention and Environmental Control. The National Center for Urban and Industrial Health also included programs for solid wastes, injury control, water supply and shellfish, and arctic health. As each national center was to be centralized in a specific city, the Occupational Health Program's administrative staff moved from Washington, D.C. to Cincinnati. Also, the Appalachian Laboratory for Occupational Respiratory Diseases was established in Morgantown, West Virginia in 1967 as an outgrowth of the coal pneumoconiosis studies.

However, another reorganization in 1968 reoriented most of PHS around two broad administrations: the Consumer Protection and Environmental Health Service (CPEHS), and the Health Services and Mental Health Administration (HSMHA). The Occupational Health Program became the Bureau of Occupational Safety and Health (BOSH), one of five bureaus within the Environmental Control Administration, which was part of CPEHS. The effect of these reorganizations was to move the occupational health unit lower in the hierarchy, further away from Department of Health, Education, and Welfare leadership. The BOSH administrative offices relocated at this time to Rockville, Maryland.

A coal mine explosion in Farmington, West Virginia in 1968 brought public attention to ongoing efforts in mine safety, and led to the passage of the Federal Coal Mine Health and Safety Act of 1969, which was proposed during the Johnson administration and passed early in the Nixon administration. While the Bureau of Mines was the enforcing agency, PHS was given responsibility for medical research and examinations. The law was the first legislatively mandated activity of BOSH or any of its predecessors, and was seminal in establishing federal rather than state supremacy in regulating industrial safety and health.

CPEHS was broken up in 1970, largely as a consequence of the formation of the Environmental Protection Agency (EPA) that year. The Environmental Control Administration's five bureaus were spit between PHS and EPA, with BOSH moving into HSMHA and the environmental health programs in the Taft Center becoming the core of EPA's research program.

== Transformation into NIOSH ==
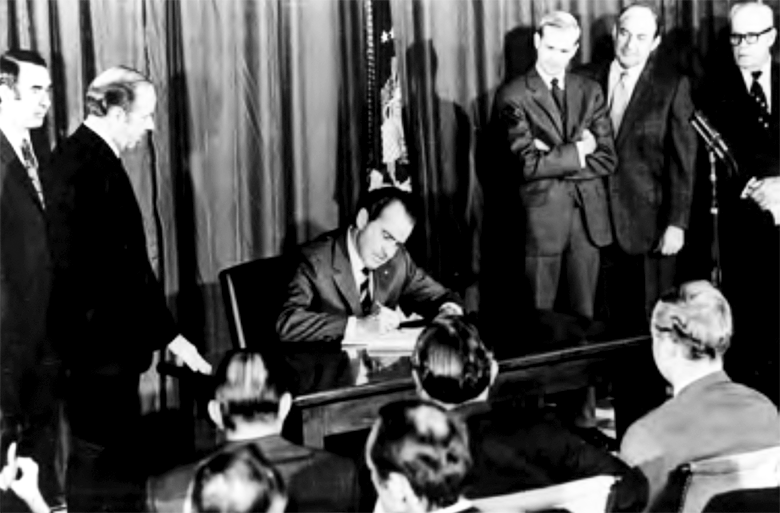
President Richard Nixon signing the Occupational Safety and Health Act. The act created the National Institute for Occupational Safety and Health from the Bureau of Occupational Safety and Health. The act also created the Occupational Safety and Health Administration from the Department of Labor Bureau of Labor Standards.

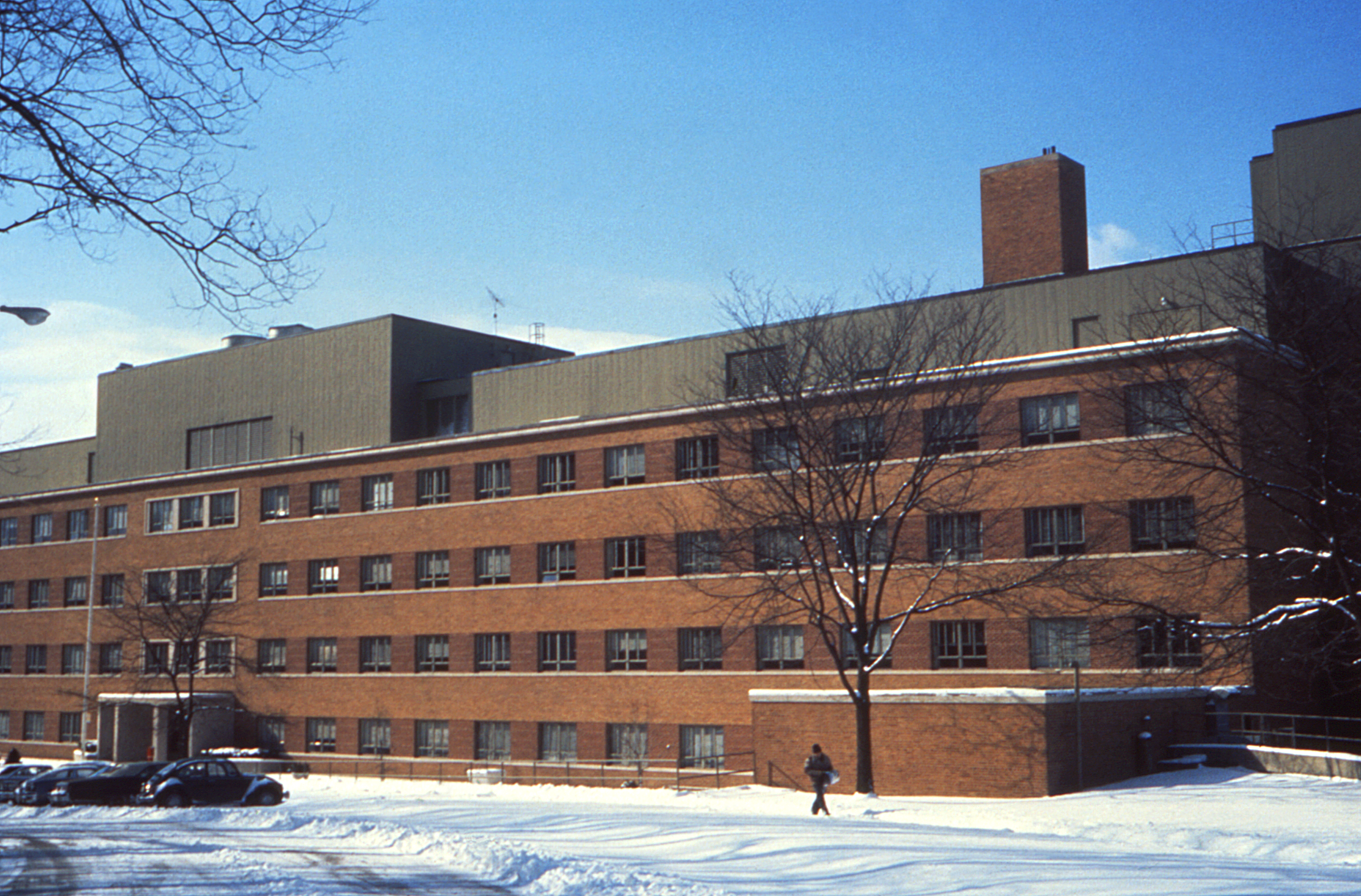
The Robert A. Taft Laboratory in 1976, the year NIOSH began occupying it. The move to Taft was intended to be temporary, but became permanent as a side effect of an unsuccessful attempt by Congress to move NIOSH to another city.

NIOSH was created out of the Bureau of Occupational Safety and Health by the Occupational Safety and Health Act of 1970, and began operating on April 28, 1971. New York Senator Jacob Javits sponsored the amendment that created NIOSH. The act established the right to a safe and healthful workplace, and established a scientific and regulatory program to support this. In addition to research, training and education, on-site investigations, and extramural research funding activities, NIOSH was given legislative responsibility to recommend standards to the Occupational Safety and Health Administration (OSHA) and Mine Safety and Health Administration (MSHA) in the form of criteria documents. It did not have the authority to promulgate binding standards in most cases, with the exception of respirator testing and approval. This independence was meant to allow it to coordinate research efforts scattered across many agencies and private organizations, and shield it from political interference directed at regulatory agencies. Its increase in functions corresponded with an increase in size, as 501 full-time positions were budgeted in its first year. Marcus M. Key, who was Chief of the Bureau of Occupational Safety and Health, became the first Director of NIOSH.

When HSMHA was broken up in 1973, NIOSH was transferred into what was then called the Center for Disease Control (CDC). The transfer was based on the two agencies' common goal of preventing disease, although NIOSH's broad range of functions, including research, meant that it would not cleanly fit under any agency. Additionally, CDC Director David Sencer was at the time also acting HSMHA Administrator, and was seeking to expand CDC's scope by absorbing other components of HSMHA. The move was criticized for moving NIOSH lower in the hierarchy and limiting the number of high-level positions available.

Prior to 1976, NIOSH's Cincinnati operations occupied space at three locations in Downtown Cincinnati: 1014 Broadway, the Potter Stewart U.S. Courthouse, and the John Weld Peck Federal Building. In 1976, staff at the three Downtown locations relocated to the Taft Center, as well as 5555 Ridge Avenue in the Pleasant Ridge neighborhood, both of which were being vacated by EPA to occupy the new Andrew W. Breidenbach Environmental Research Center elsewhere in Cincinnati. 5555 Ridge Avenue had been constructed during 1952–1954 and was initially the headquarters and manufacturing plant of Disabled American Veterans; PHS had leased space in it beginning in 1962.

The move to Taft was intended as a temporary measure, as 1014 Broadway was too small for the expanded agency and was nearing condemnation, and NIOSH was intended to move into a new building to be constructed next to the EPA Breidenbach Center. While studies in 1973 and 1975 concluded that NIOSH should stay in Cincinnati at a new facility, a 1976 measure sponsored by Wisconsin Representative Dave Obey forced another reevaluation of NIOSH's location, in the hopes of moving it to another city. The new report recommended that NIOSH move to Chicago, but the report's conclusions were rejected by Secretary of Health, Education, and Welfare Joseph A. Califano Jr. on the basis that it did not adequately consider the cost of relocation. In 1978, the Department of Health, Education, and Welfare determined that NIOSH did not require a new facility after all, making permanent its location in Cincinnati and the Taft Center.

By 1973, the entire 5555 Ridge Avenue building in Cincinnati was leased by the federal government. It was purchased outright by the PHS in 1982, and in 1987 it was renamed the Alice Hamilton Laboratory for Occupational Safety and Health, in honor of occupational health pioneer Alice Hamilton. The Appalachian Laboratory for Occupational Respiratory Diseases, which had been created in 1967 to focus on black lung disease research, opened its new building in Morgantown, West Virginia in 1971. The Salt Lake City field station became the Western Area Laboratory for Occupational Safety and Health (WALOSH) and moved into a newly constructed facility in 1975. However, the following year WALOSH was disbanded and the facility was transferred to OSHA, with its functions and a few of its staff transferred to Morgantown. In 1981, the NIOSH headquarters in Rockville, Maryland was moved to Atlanta to co-locate with CDC headquarters, with some staff moving to Cincinnati. The headquarters would return to Washington, D.C. in 1994, with the Atlanta office remaining open as well.

== Chiefs ==
List of Chiefs
Name		Dates	Notes	Add'l refs
A photographic portrait of a man wearing glasses and a suit	Joseph W. Schereschewsky	1914–1918		
	Anthony J. Lanza	1918–1920		
	Bernard J. Newman	1920–1921	temporary	
	William J. McConnell	1921		
A photographic portrait of a middle-aged man wearing a suit	Lewis Ryers Thompson	1921–1930		
A candid photograph of a man wearing a suit	James P. Leake	1930–1932		
A photographic portrait of a man wearing a suit seated at a desk with a pen in his hand	Royd Ray Sayers	1932–1940	became U.S. Bureau of Mines director in 1940	
A photographic portrait of a man wearing a suit	Paul A. Neil	1940–1941		
A photographic portrait of a man wearing a suit	James G. Townsend	1941–1951		
A candid photograph of a man wearing a suit speaking at a lectern	Seward E. Miller	1951–1954	became Chief of Division of Special Health Services in 1954–1956	
A photographic portrait of a man wearing glasses and a suit	Henry N. Doyle	1954–1956		
A candid photograph of a man wearing glasses and a suit	Harold J. Magnuson	1956–1962		
A photographic portrait of a man wearing a suit	W. Clark Cooper	1962–1963		
A photographic portrait of a man wearing glasses and a suit	Harry Heimann	1963–1964		
A photographic portrait of a man wearing a suit	Murray C. Brown	1964–1969		
	Duncan A. Holaday	1969	acting	
A photograph of a man wearing a suit looking towards the left with a flag behind him	Marcus M. Key	1969–1971	became first NIOSH director until 1974	
