= George T. Brown =

George T. Brown (1907–1967) was an American scholar who served as deputy director of the Bureau of Labor Standards in the Department of Labor from 1961 until his death.

== Early life and education ==
Born in Baltimore, Brown attended Baltimore City College and earned a Ph.D. in political economy from Johns Hopkins University in 1934.

== Career ==
From 1942 to 1946, Brown worked in the office of the National War Labor Board. In 1953, he served briefly as executive assistant to Secretary of Labor Martin Patrick Durkin. Between 1953 and 1961, Brown was an assistant to AFL-CIO president George Meany and chaired a committee that assisted the Bureau of Labor Standards in drafting initial safety regulations for longshoremen and ship-repair workers.
