= Olive Whitlock Klump =

American industrial nurse

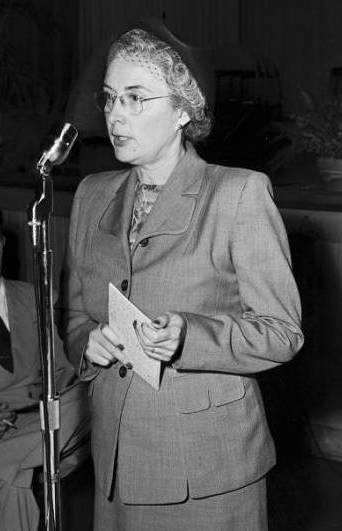
Olive W. Klump in 1951

Olive M. Whitlock Klump (June 8, 1902 – December 14, 1980) was an American nurse and the first industrial nurse to work for the United States federal government, as part of the U.S. Public Health Service's Division of Industrial Hygiene, from 1939 to 1943. She later directed the Los Angeles County Health Department's Bureau of Public Health Nursing for over two decades.

== Early life ==
She was born Olive M. Whitlock in 1902 in Weatherby, Missouri. She earned a B.S. from Washington University in St. Louis in 1930 in nursing; she worked on a ship to support herself during college, first as a waitress, then as its physician-assistant. She then worked as a rural nurse in Atchison County, Missouri.

Whitlock led the Division of Public Health Nursing and Child Hygiene for the Oregon State Board of Health from 1935 until 1939, and also served as an instructor at the University of Oregon Medical School during this time.

== Public Health Service ==
Whitlock was appointed to the Division of Industrial Hygiene of the U.S. Public Health Service from 1939 to 1943, and worked with the American Public Health Association to design a survey to collect information from industrial nursing professionals from across the United States. Whitlock authored the resulting report, which was published two years later. The report recommended that industrial nurses should be recruited from professional nursing channels, established the core duties of industrial nurses, and recommended the number of nurses per employees.

She married Karl Klump in 1942, after which she went by Olive W. Klump.

== Los Angeles County Department of Health ==
From 1945 until her retirement in 1968, she was Director of the Bureau of Public Health Nursing of the Los Angeles County Health Department. Among her initiatives was using data-driven time management analysis to improve workforce allocation in 1960. In 1966, she wrote about the effect on nursing of shifts from general to specialized funding of programs.

In 1948, she was the President of the California State Organization of Public Health Nursing. During 1949–1952, she was president of the California State Nurses Association.

She received the Pearl McIver Public Health Nurse Award in 1966, and the following year the Nurses Association of the Los Angeles County Health Department commissioned a portrait of Klump to hang in the Los Angeles County Hall of Records.

== Death and legacy ==
She died on December 14, 1980, in Glendale, California at the age of 78. The American Cancer Society named an award after her.
