= Turney House =

- U.S. Historic district – Contributing property
- Pittsburgh Historic Designation
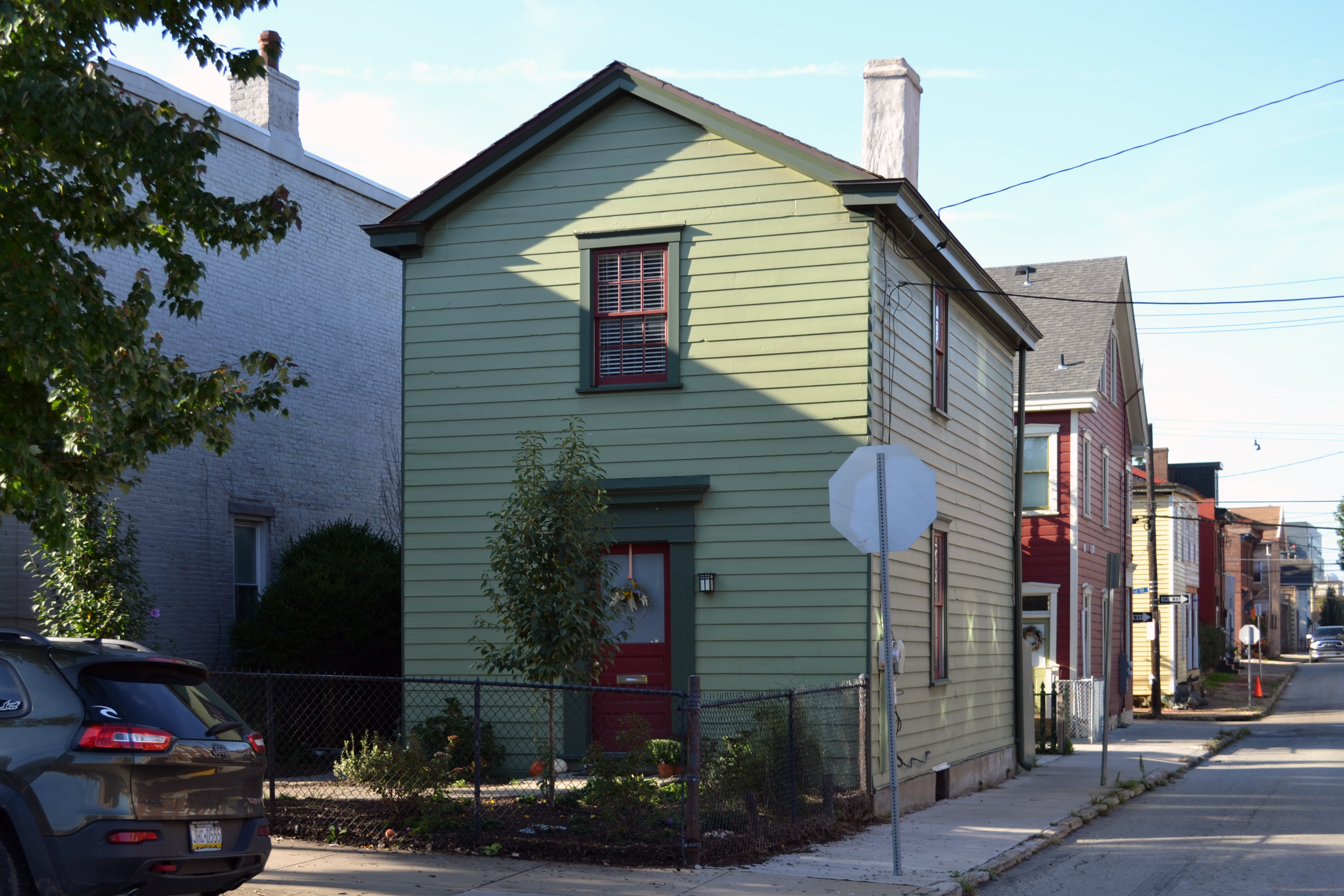
- The house in 2018

- Location within Pittsburgh
- Location: 160 43rd St. Pittsburgh, Pennsylvania
- Coordinates: 40°28′17″N 79°57′42″W
- Built: c. 1851
- Part of: Lawrenceville Historic District (ID100004020)

Significant dates
- Designated CP: July 8, 2019
- Designated PHD: September 25, 2015

The Turney House is a historic house in the Lawrenceville neighborhood of Pittsburgh, Pennsylvania, and a designated Pittsburgh historic landmark. It was built circa 1851 by Lucian B. Turney, a carpenter who also served on the Lawrenceville Borough Council during the 1850s. It was also the residence of Turney's daughter Margaret, who at age 17 was one of 78 workers killed in the 1862 Allegheny Arsenal Explosion, the deadliest civilian disaster during the U.S. Civil War. After the demolition of 184 38th Street in 2011, the Turney House is the only surviving house known to be associated with a victim of the explosion. Another one of Turney's children, Olive, became a successful artist. In 1996, the house was purchased by architectural historian Carol Peterson, who restored it to a period-appropriate appearance.

== History ==
Built by Lucian B. Turney, a 19th-century carpenter and a member of the Lawrenceville Borough Council and Lawrenceville School Board (1856), the Turney House was erected in Pennsylvania sometime around 1851. Eleven years later, Turney and his home became linked historically with the deadliest civilian disaster of the American Civil War when his 17-year-old daughter, Margaret A. Turney, was listed in multiple newspapers as one of 78 workers who had been killed when a series of explosions destroyed the laboratory at the Allegheny Arsenal on September 26. The Catholic noted that she had been found among the 24 women and girls killed in "Room No. 4," which was destroyed during the second explosion and was one of the rooms where employees processed rifle cartridges for shipment.

The Turney House subsequently became the only surviving house known to be associated with a victim of the arsenal explosion when the McBride Log House in Lawrenceville was demolished in 2011.

== Architecture ==
The house is a small, two-story frame building with a front-gabled slate roof, clapboard siding, and modest Greek Revival style wooden trim. It stands on a corner lot at the relatively busy intersection of 43rd Street and Foster Street. The front elevation has a single bay with a centered door and window, while the rear elevation has three bays with one large window on the second floor and one large window, one small window, and a door on the first floor. The Foster Street elevation has one window on each floor near the front, and the opposite (southeast) elevation has two large windows on each floor as well as one small window on the second floor and a side door on the first floor. Most of the window openings are fitted with 6-over-6 sash windows. The property also contains the only known outhouse remaining in Lawrenceville.
