= Linda Hawes Clever =

Professor of medicine

- Born: Seattle, Washington, U.S.
- Education: Stanford University (BS, MD)
- Spouse: James A. Clever

Linda Hawes Clever is an American physician known for her work on occupational health. She served as the editor-in-chief of the Western Journal of Medicine and was elected to the Institute of Medicine in 1981. Clever is known for establishing new teaching programs at St. Mary's Hospital in San Francisco and for starting the Department of Occupational Health at the California Pacific Medical Center.

== Early life and education ==
Clever was born in Seattle, Washington and was an only child. Her father, who worked for the JC Penney company, was promoted often, which resulted in her moving frequently and growing up in different states across the United States, though she spent most of her teenage years in New York. Her mother, Evelyn Hawes née Johnson, was a writer.

She graduated from Stanford University in 1962, where she received undergraduate degrees in speech pathology and audiology. She began attending Standford's medical school in her junior year, and received her M.D. in 1965. While at Stanford, Hawes was elected president of the Stanford University Medical School Student Body, becoming the first woman to hold the position. She began post-doctoral training in Internal Medicine, Infectious Diseases, Community Medicine, and Occupational Health at Stanford and the University of California, San Francisco.

== Career ==
Following her training, Clever became the medical director of the Outpatient Clinic at St. Mary's Hospital. There, she established new programs, such as those for patient education research and training for nurse practitioners. She was later recruited by the California Pacific Medical Center and served as founding chair for the first Department of Occupational Health. She started the San Francisco Clinic Chiefs group and worked with the San Francisco AIDS Foundation to educate communities to reduce fear and discrimination surrounding the disease.

Clever became president of the Western Association of Physicians and served as editor-in-chief for the Western Journal of Medicine. She started as editor-in-chief in 1991, and held the position until 1999.

She became the first woman governor of the American College of Physicians, and subsequently was a regent and officer.

In 1998, Clever founded RENEW, a nonprofit organization dedicated to providing and maintaining health for healthcare professionals and resilience, purpose, and happiness while balancing professional and personal life in other people.

== Selected publications ==
- Clever, L. H.; LeGuyader, Y. (1995-05-01). "Infectious Risks for Health Care Workers". Annual Review of Public Health. 16: 141–164. doi:10.1146/annurev.pu.16.050195.001041. ISSN 0163-7525. PMID 7639868.
- Clever, Linda Hawes (2002-03-05). "Who Is Sicker: Patients—or Residents? Residents' Distress and the Care of Patients". Annals of Internal Medicine. 136 (5): 391–393. doi:10.7326/0003-4819-136-5-200203050-00012. ISSN 0003-4819. PMID 11874312.
- Clever, Linda Hawes (2010). The Fatigue Prescription: Four Steps to Renewing Your Energy, Health, and Life. New York: Start Publishing LLC. ISBN 978-1-57344-380-7.

== Awards and honors ==
Clever was the 1961 recipient of the Dinklespiel Award for "outstanding service to undergraduate education". She was elected to the National Academy of Medicine in 1981. In 1999, Clever won the Alfred Stengel Memorial Award from the American College of Physicians, In 2010, Clever was awarded the Elizabeth Blackwell Medal by the American Medical Women’s Association.

== Personal life ==
She married her husband, James A. Clever, after her third year at Stanford. In 1971 Clever described an advantage of being married is that she "avoided the unnecessary business that an unmarried medical woman might get".
