= United States Marine Hospital (Pittsburgh) =

Former hospital in Pittsburgh, Pennsylvania

Two buildings in Pittsburgh were known as the United States Marine Hospital. They were part of the U.S. Marine Hospital system, which was run by the Marine Hospital Service and its successor the Public Health Service, primarily for the benefit of the civilian merchant marine. The original hospital was located in Allegheny City and was used as a Marine Hospital during 1851–1875, after which it was sold. It was demolished in the late 1880s for construction of the Ohio Connecting Railroad Bridge.

The replacement opened in 1909 on part of the land previously occupied by the Allegheny Arsenal. It was the first home of the Office of Industrial Hygiene and Sanitation, the earliest predecessor of the National Institute for Occupational Safety and Health, during 1915–1918. It operated as a hospital until 1949, and then became the Allegheny County Health Department's headquarters, now named the Frank B. Clack Health Center. It became a contributing property to the newly created Lawrenceville Historic District in 2019.

== First hospital ==
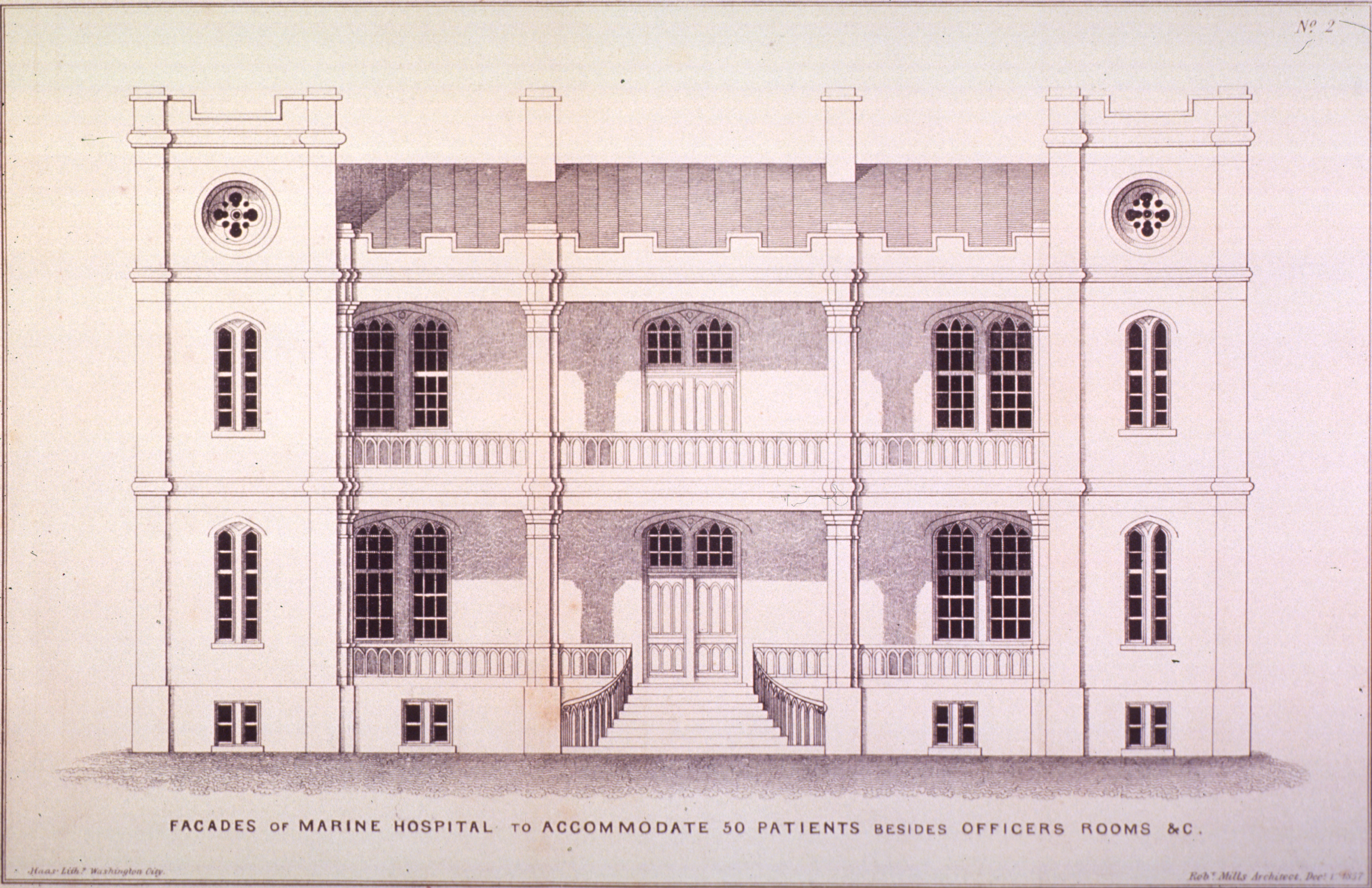
Robert Mills' 1837 design for hospitals on the western waters, upon which the first Pittsburgh Marine Hospital was based

U.S. Marine Hospital (Pittsburgh)
- Interactive map of the U.S. Marine Hospital (Pittsburgh) area

General information
- Coordinates: 40.4663°N 80.0378°W
- Completed: 1851
- Demolished: 1880s

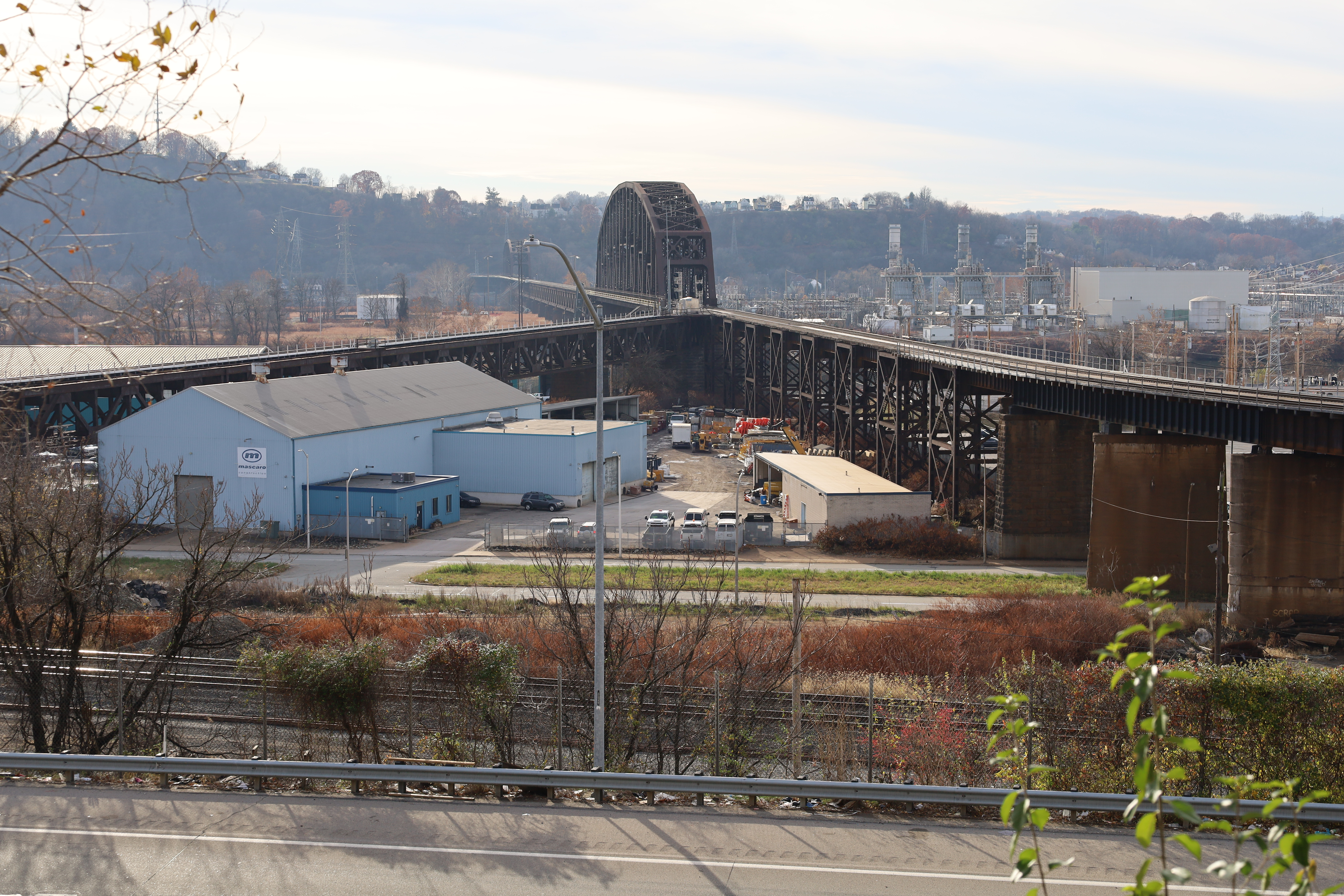
The site of the first hospital is now occupied by approach tracks to the Ohio Connecting Railroad Bridge

In the early 19th century, the first Marine Hospitals were established along the East Coast of the United States. An 1837 report recommended sites for an expansion of the system to what was then considered the "western waters", mainly the Mississippi River and Ohio River. The report recommended that a Marine Hospital be placed in Wheeling, Virginia (now in West Virginia), but this site was changed to Pittsburgh before construction. U.S. Representative Moses Hampton was said to be instrumental in having the hospital sited in Pittsburgh.

The Pittsburgh hospital was authorized in 1840 and constructed during 1846–1851. The building layout was based on the then-standard Marine Hospital plan by Robert Mills and Thomas Lawson. It was located downstream of Allegheny City.

In 1871, the Marine Hospital Service was created within the Department of the Treasury to centralize management of the system. In its first report, it recommended that the Pittsburgh hospital be disposed of and replaced due to its dilapidated state and unhealthy location between a blast furnace and an iron rolling mill.

An initial auction sale was rejected by Treasury officials due to the price being too low. The building and grounds were successfully sold to liquor merchant J. H. Hespenheide on April 19, 1875 for $33,000 and then used as a saloon. The building was shown on maps as late as 1886. By 1890 it had been demolished for construction of the northeastern approach of the Ohio Connecting Railroad Bridge.

== Second hospital ==
- U.S. Marine Hospital (Pittsburgh); Frank B. Clack Health Center
- U.S. Historic district – Contributing property
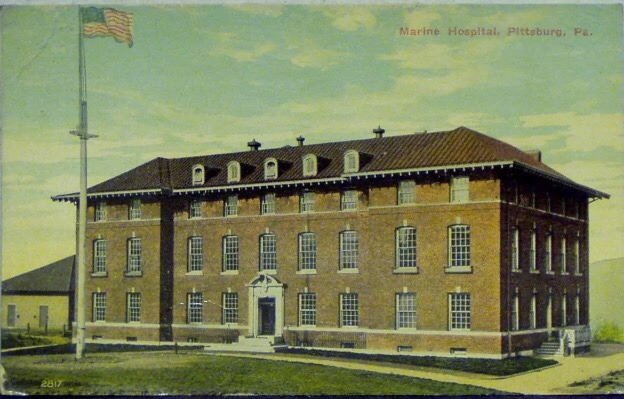
- Early 20th century postcard depicting the hospital
- Interactive map of U.S. Marine Hospital (Pittsburgh); Frank B. Clack Health Center
- Coordinates: 40.4654°N 79.9590°W
- Built: 1909
- Part of: Lawrenceville Historic District (ID100004020)
- Designated CP: July 8, 2019

=== Marine Hospital ===
Although funds raised from the 1875 sale were supposed to be used to erect a new hospital, this did not happen in a timely manner. Mercy Hospital was contracted to provide hospital services to rivermen in the interim. By the 1890s, rivermen were actively lobbying for the construction of a new Marine Hospital.

Funding for the second hospital was approved by Congress on March 31, 1902. It was built on five acres that were part of land previously occupied by the Allegheny Arsenal. The land was transferred in 1904 and the building constructed during 1908–1909. It is a brick Classical Revival building 9 bays wide and 3.5 stories high.

In 1915, the Pittsburgh Marine Hospital became the first home of the Office of Industrial Hygiene and Sanitation, which would eventually become the National Institute for Occupational Safety and Health. Laboratories for chemistry, physiology, and bacteriology were constructed on the building's second floor, and a physical laboratory on the ground floor, all in the northwest wing of the building. It was the first laboratory for scientific investigation of occupational health in the United States. Its location was in proximity to the recently established Bruceton Research Center of the U.S. Bureau of Mines, enhancing cooperation on miners' health. In 1918, the Office relocated to Washington, D.C.

By 1921, the complex had five buildings. John McGraw, later a brigadier general in the United States Air Force, served a junior internship at the hospital during 1933–1934.

=== Local health center ===
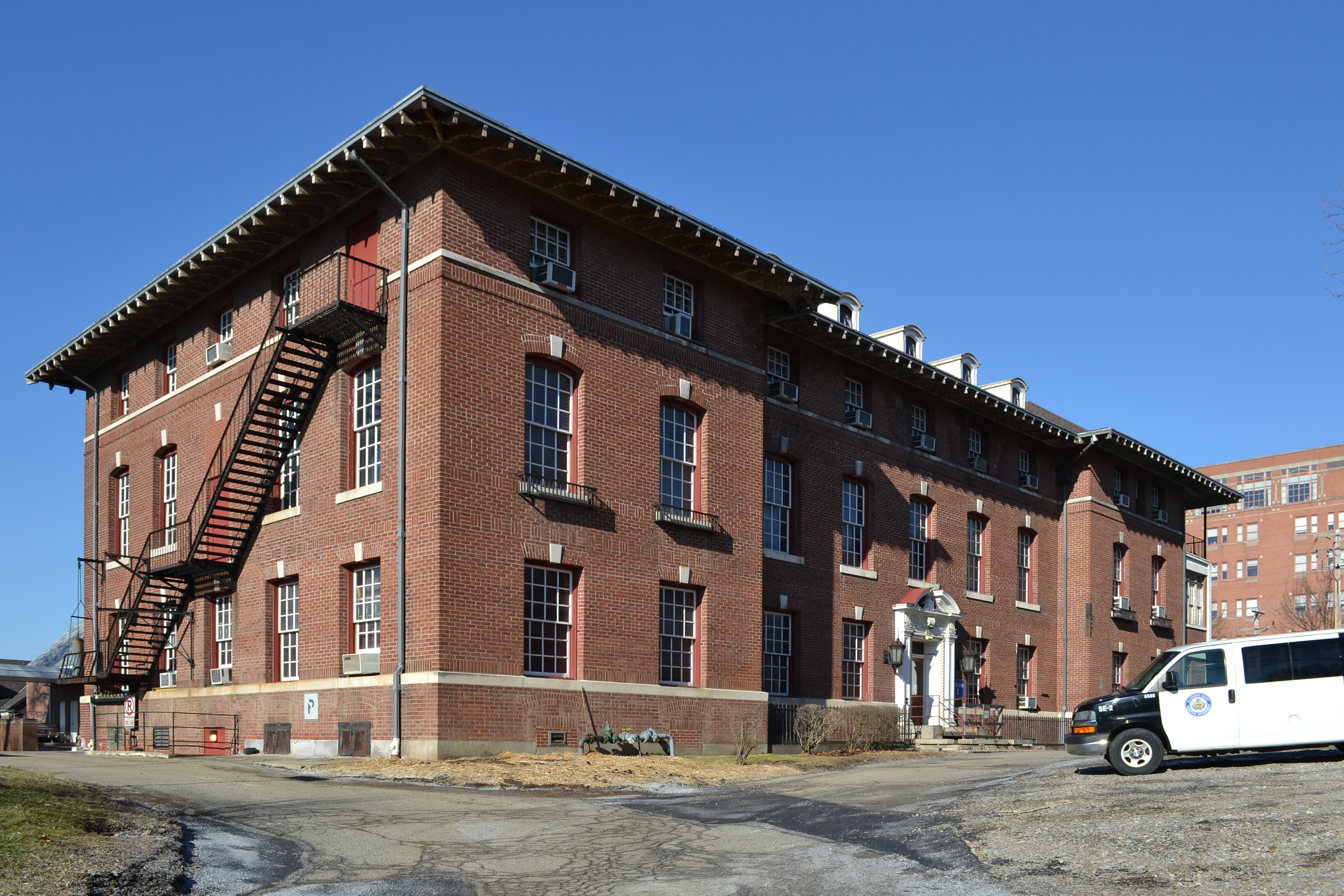
The former hospital in 2019

The Marine Hospital ceased operating in 1949. In 1950, it was leased to the City of Pittsburgh, and in 1956 ownership was transferred outright. It became known as the Arsenal Health Center. In the 1950s the facility was the site of a research nursery school directed by Benjamin Spock.

It eventually became home to the Allegheny County Health Department's headquarters. In 1979, it was renamed the Frank B. Clack Health Center. Clack had been Director of the Allegheny County Health Department during 1970–1979.

In 2004, the Young Preservationists Association of Pittsburgh named the building one of the area's top ten historic preservation opportunities in the area. At the time, the former hospital was part of a seven-building complex with a green lawn and garden-like setting.

In 2018, the Allegheny County Health Department used money from its Clean Air Fund to renovate the former hospital building for a new air quality program headquarters. In 2019, it became a contributing property to the newly created Lawrenceville Historic District.
