= Allegheny Arsenal =

Supply center for the Union Army during the American Civil War in Lawrenceville, PA

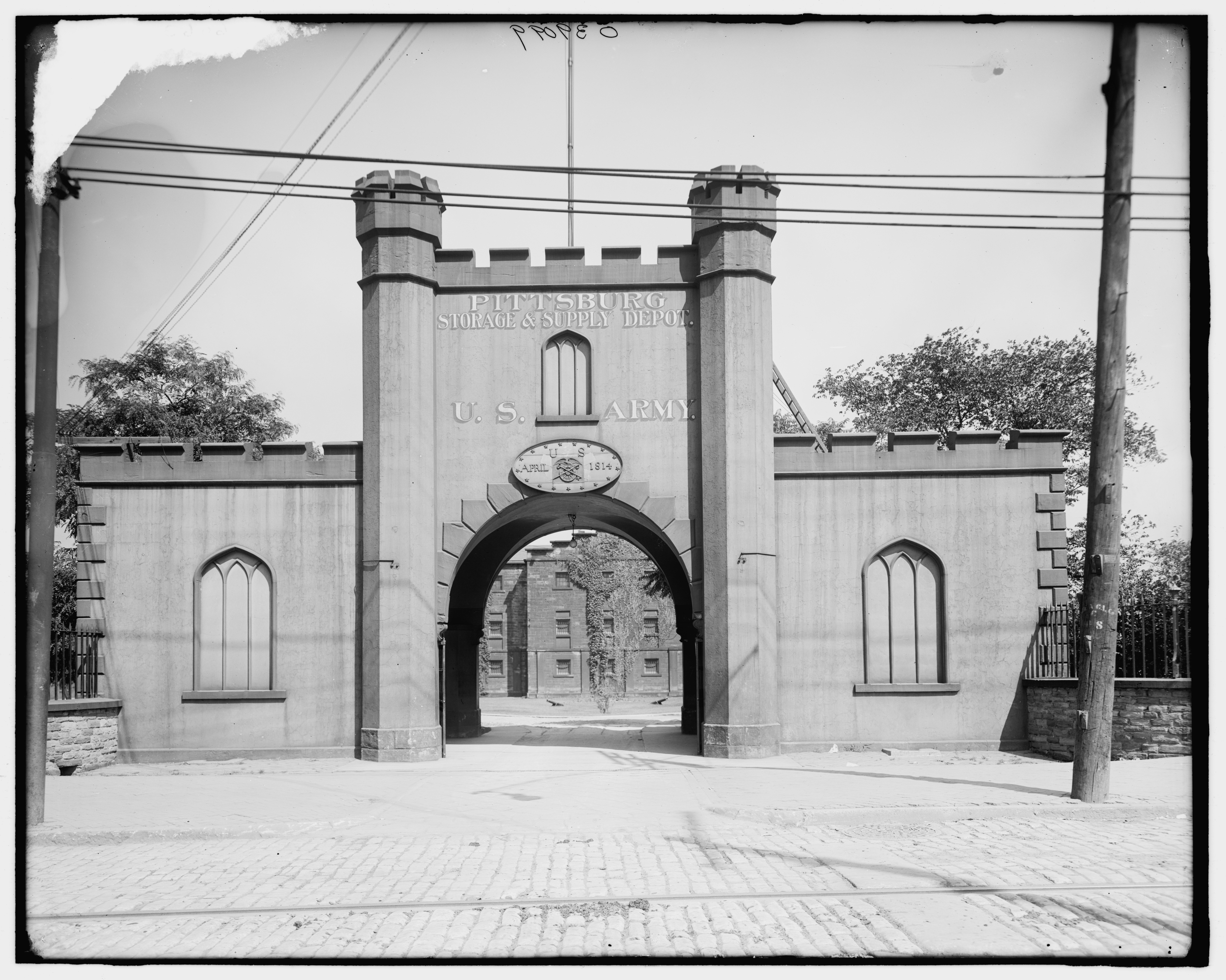
- Main gate of the arsenal around 1900

- Location within Pittsburgh
- 40.4666°N 79.9611°W
- Location: Lower Lawrenceville, Pittsburgh, Pennsylvania

History
- Built: 1814; 212 years ago

Site notes
- Area: 9 acres (3.6 ha)
- Architect: Benjamin Henry Latrobe?
- Governing body: City of Pittsburgh

The Allegheny Arsenal, established in 1814, was an important supply and manufacturing center for the Union Army during the American Civil War, and the site of the single largest civilian disaster during the war. It was located in the community of Lawrenceville, Pennsylvania, which was annexed by the city of Pittsburgh in 1868.

Today, the site is the location of the nine-acre Arsenal Park as well as Arsenal Middle School, a county health services complex, and a large condominium development.

In 2012, officials from the Pittsburgh History & Landmarks Foundation began drawing attention to the deteriorating arsenal structures.

== Origins ==
The Arsenal was established by the U.S. Army Ordnance Department near Pittsburgh in 1814. It was situated on 30 acres (12 ha) of land bordering the Allegheny River in the community of Lawrenceville. The site was bounded by 39th Street, 40th Street, and Penn Avenue, and bisected by Butler Street, which was and still is the main thoroughfare of Lawrenceville.

HABS drawing showing the layout of the arsenal around 1868

The arsenal served as a supply and manufacturing center for the troops in the west. Its peak years came during the Civil War, especially when the manufacture of paper cartridges for rifles became a high priority. Civilian employment at the arsenal increased from a pre-war total of 308 to over 1100 workers. One of the busiest facilities was the main lab, which employed 158 workers, the majority of whom were women engaged in the making of cartridges.

== Explosion ==
On Wednesday, September 17, 1862, around 2 pm, the arsenal exploded. The explosion shattered windows in the surrounding community and was heard in Pittsburgh, over two miles (3 km) away. At the sound of the first explosion, Col. John Symington, Commander of the Arsenal, rushed from his quarters and made his way up the hillside to the lab. As he approached, he heard the sound of a second explosion, followed by a third. Fire fighting equipment as well as a bucket brigade tried to douse the flames with water. The volunteer fire company from Pittsburgh arrived and assisted in bringing the fire under control.

By the time the fire was put out, the lab had been reduced to a pile of smoldering rubble. Seventy-eight workers, mostly young women, were killed. Fifty-four bodies were unidentified, and were buried in a mass grave in the nearby Allegheny Cemetery. Among those killed were 15-year-old munitions assembler Catherine Burkhart, who lived at 184 38th Street, and 17-year-old Margaret Turney, who lived at 160 43rd Street.

=== Investigation ===
The most commonly held view of the cause of the explosion was that the metal shoe of a horse had struck a spark which touched off loose powder in the roadway near the lab, which then traveled up onto the porch where it set off several barrels of gunpowder. A coroner's jury held that the accident had been the result of the negligent conduct of Col. John Symington and his subordinates in allowing loose powder to accumulate on the roadway and elsewhere. However, during a subsequent military inquiry into the conduct of Col. Symington, many of the same witnesses who had appeared before the coroner changed their testimony. There were so many discrepancies between the two hearings that most of the commonly held views of the explosion have been shown to be thoroughly discredited. In the end Col. Symington was found innocent of any wrongdoing by the army, and the court concluded that "the cause of the explosion could not be satisfactorily ascertained...."

Col. Symington, in a letter to the Ordnance Department two days after the explosion, speculated that it had been caused "by the leaking out of powder when one of the barrels was being placed on the platform." In fact the problem of leaking barrels seemed to be the one point of agreement among all the witnesses. Alexander McBride, the Superintendent of the Lab, had repeatedly complained that the powder shipped by Dupont and Company was delivered in defective barrels with loose covers. Symington was suspicious that the "parties shipping powder may have used barrels more than once for the shipment of powder, as the barrels have been returned to them at their request." But in the end, the final word still belongs to the Army inquiry and the exact cause remains unknown. Col. Symington would be placed on medical leave after the hearings and retire the following year.

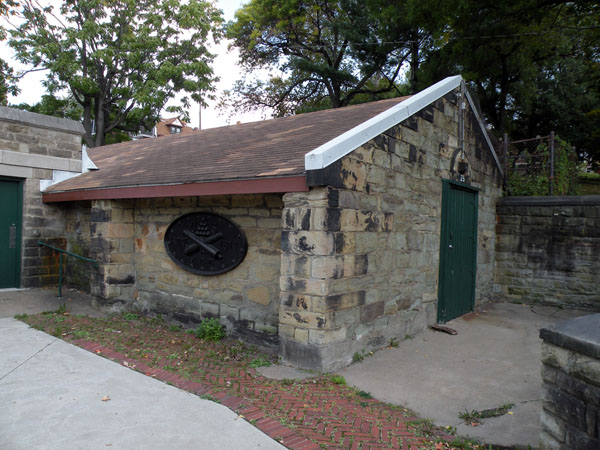
The powder magazine, built in 1814, is the oldest surviving arsenal building

=== Aftermath ===
The explosion at the Arsenal was overshadowed by the Battle of Antietam, which occurred on the same day near the town of Sharpsburg, Maryland.

==== Monument ====
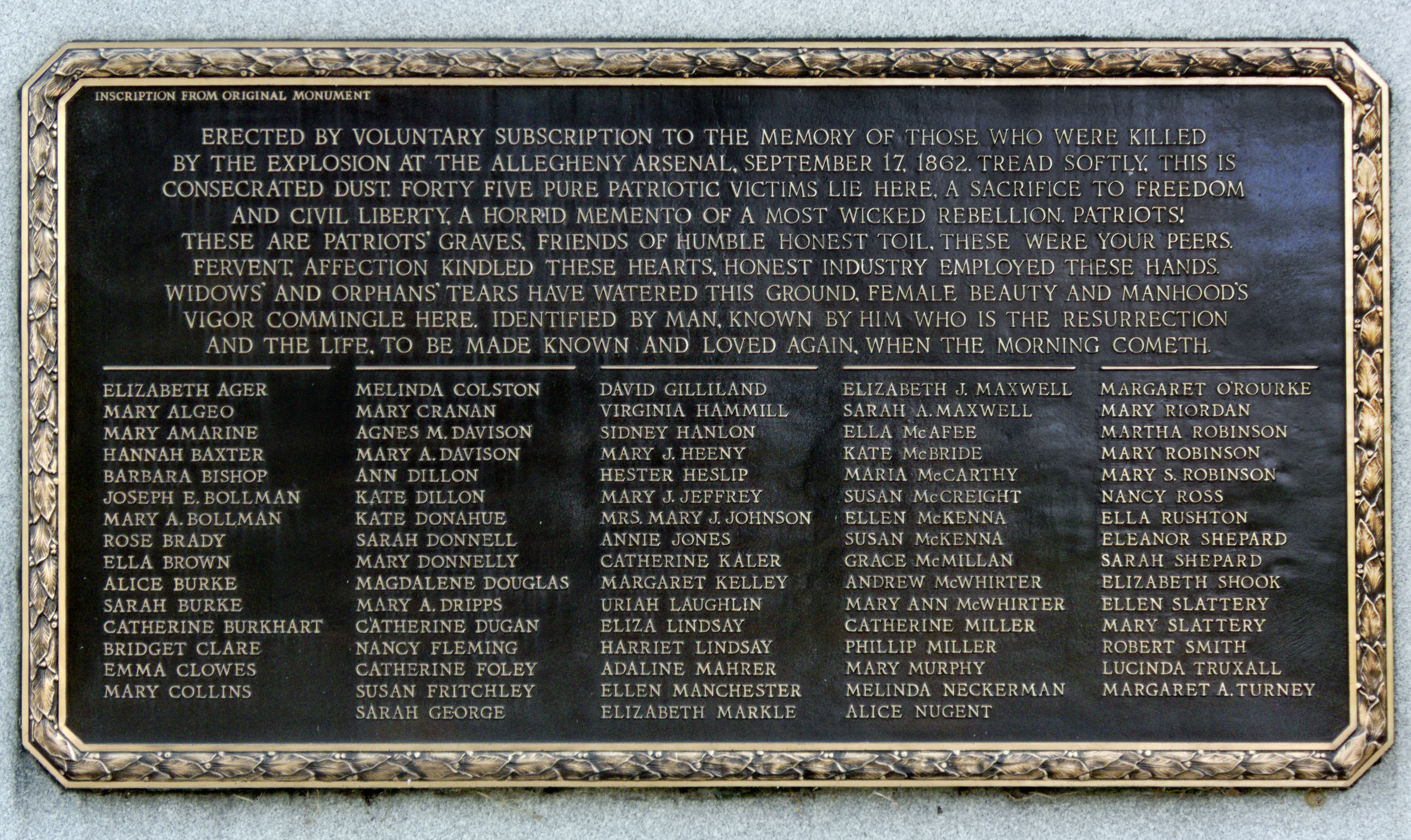
Inscription on the monument in Allegheny Cemetery

A monument to those killed in the explosion is located near the graves of the unidentified victims in Section 17 of Allegheny Cemetery. The monument was dedicated on May 27, 1928, replacing an earlier marble shaft placed shortly after the explosion which had become illegible by the 1920s. The monument lists the names of all 78 people killed in the blast along with a dedicatory text transcribed from the original monument.

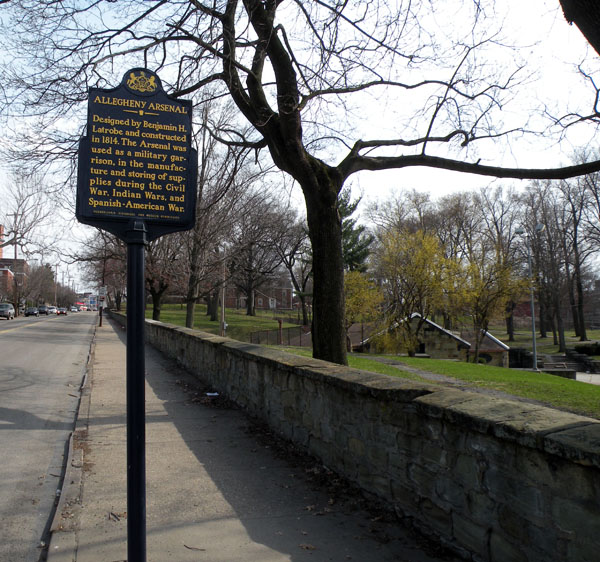
Arsenal Park, part of the former arsenal site, including the surviving powder magazine (right), stone wall, and Pennsylvania state historical marker

== Later history ==
Work at the Arsenal continued, and a new lab was constructed by the following year. After the war, the Allegheny Arsenal served primarily as a storage facility for the Ordnance Department and Quartermaster Corps.

In the early 1900s, the War Department consolidated its operations in the western half of the arsenal grounds. The other half, above Butler Street, became surplus property. Five acres at the east end were transferred in 1904 to build the Pittsburgh U.S. Marine Hospital, which is now the Allegheny County Health Department's Frank B. Clack Health Center. The remaining land was converted into Arsenal Park, which was dedicated on the Fourth of July, 1907. Arsenal Middle School was built at the west end of the park in 1932.

The western half of the arsenal remained in use through World War I but eventually became obsolete. It was sold to the H. J. Heinz Company in 1926 and subsequently used for various industrial and commercial purposes. The arsenal's former main gate was demolished in 1947 to make more room for delivery trucks, though it remained as a pile of rubble until the site was cleared for a new supermarket in 1961. Most of the western half of the arsenal site is now occupied by the Arsenal 201 condominium complex. Construction crews working on the condominiums uncovered caches of Civil-War-era cannonballs in 2017 and again in 2020.

Today the site of the explosion is in a ballfield in Arsenal Park. Most of the arsenal buildings were demolished, but there are four still standing: the powder magazine, now a maintenance shed for the park, two magazine buildings on the grounds of the Clack Health Center, and a former officers' quarters on 39th Street. A Quartermaster Corps insignia dated 1814 that was originally part of the gate was preserved and is now mounted on the old powder magazine. All of the surviving buildings, along with several sections of stone wall surrounding the former arsenal, became contributing properties to the newly created Lawrenceville Historic District in 2019. In 2026, the officers' quarters and surviving wall sections were designated a historic site by the city of Pittsburgh.

== See also ==
- 1864 Washington Arsenal explosion
- Brown's Island, Richmond, Virginia. Exploded in 1863
