= Dorothy MacBride Radwanski =

British nurse

Dorothy MacBride Radwanski FRCN
- Born: Dorothy MacBride Warnock; 31 January 1928; Ayr, Scotland
- Died: 29 December 2012 (aged 84)
- Occupation: occupational health nurse
- Known for: shaping occupational health nursing in the UK and Nigeria

Dorothy MacBride Radwanski (née Warnock, 31 January 1928 – 29 December 2012) was a Scottish nurse, known for her pioneering work in occupational health nursing in the UK and Nigeria.

== Early life ==
Radwanski was born in Ayr, Scotland. She attended Hutchesons' Girls Grammar School in Glasgow.

== Nursing career ==
In 1952, Radwanski trained as a nurse at the School of Nursing at the Western Infirmary, Glasgow. In 1962, she qualified as a midwife at the Royal Maternity Hospital in Glasgow. After gaining some experience of nursing she studied for and obtained the Certificate in Occupational Health Nursing of the Royal College of Nursing. Radwanski was a pioneer in the training of occupational health nurses. Radwanski was Principal Nursing Officer of the Central Middlesex Hospital Occupational health service from 1957 to 1962. This was for the benefit of industries in the locality.

Radwanski was the first occupational health nurse to be attached to a major hospital in the United Kingdom and she was an advocate for the establishment of Occupational Health Service for hospital staff. Radwanski became the Nursing Advisor to HJ Heinz Northern Factories, British Leyland, and then the Nursing Superintendent pioneering the introduction of the Central Middlesex Industrial Health Service.

In 1969, Radwanski was appointed Lecturer in the University of Dundee and developed the Royal College of Nursing Occupational Health Certificate (OHNC) course there. Radwanski carried out a study of occupational health nursing in Scotland and was involved in a survey of health care provisions for the staff of health boards.

Radwanski became the first Chief Nursing Advisor (1974 to 1983) to the newly formed Employment Medical Advisory Service (EMAS) (later known as the Health and Safety Executive). As Chief Nursing Advisor Radwanski advised the medical director on all nursing aspects and was actively involved in policy formation for the service. She was called upon for advice by Government departments and other national and international bodies.

In 1984, Radwanski set up the Civil Service Occupational Health Service. She also worked as a consultant to many government departments, including the Cabinet Office and Her Majesty's Prison Service.

Radwanski was one of the two prime movers behind the government report 'The Way Ahead' in 1979.

Radwanski had an international reputation and was a member of The Occupational Health Nursing Committee of the Permanent Commission and International Association on Occupational Health. From 1978 she served on its Nursing sub-committee.

Radwanski advised on the development of occupational health nursing services and the education of occupational health nurses in Nigeria.

Radwanski spoke at various conferences including the XVII/International Congress on Occupational Health Brighton, England, September 14–19, 1975.

Radwanski was one of the very few occupational nurses in industry in the 1960. She was quoted In occupational health books including in "Working Lives: Work in Britain since 1945" by Arthur McIvor (2013), where she described conditions in the foundry at the North British Locomotive Works in Glasgow: "'the air was black; the men were absolutely black. I was absolutely shocked and I said to somebody 'it's like Dante's inferno'".

== Personal life ==
In 1960, she married Jozef Radwanski (d. 1999), a decorated Polish pilot who transferred to the RAF during the World War II. Following her retirement, she volunteered at the Burrell Collection in Glasgow and took creative writing and computing courses. Radwanski's Christian faith was central to her life.

== Death ==
Radwanski died on 29 December 2012.

== Honours ==
- In 1981 Radwanski was elected Fellow of the Royal College of Nursing (FRCN).
- In 1981 Radwanski was awarded the Order of St John.
- In 2013 the Association of Occupational Health Nurse Practitioners (UK) dedicated the book Contemporary Occupational Health Nursing to the memory to Dorothy Radwanski.

== Bibliography ==
- Occupational health services: the way ahead. A discussion document issued by the Health and Safety Commission. (London, HMSO 1977)
- The forgotten nine thousand. Nursing Mirror. 155(14) pp. 46–48, 1982
- Occupational health services in Nigeria. International nursing review, 1972
- An Experiment in Occupational Health Nursing Teaching. Occupational Health Nursing, 1976
- with Semmence A (1984). Occupational health and the general practitioner. Journal of the Royal College of General Practitioners
- with J.C.G. Pearson (1972). Occupational Health Nursing In Scotland. Occupational Medicine, Volume 22, Issue 1, Pages 122–125
- with J.C.G. Pearson (1974). Principles of Design of Occupational Health Records. Occupational Medicine, Volume 24, Issue 1, Pages 17–24
- Radwanski, Dorothy M. (1961). "An Industrial Nurse in a General Hospital Occupational Health Unit". American Association of Industrial Nurses Journal. 9 (3): 28–29. doi:10.1177/216507996100900309.
