= Western Journal of Medicine =

- Discipline: Medicine
- Language: English
- Edited by: Michael Wilkes

Publication details
- Former names: Transactions of the Medical Society of the State of California, California State Journal of Medicine, California and Western Medicine, California Medicine, Western Journal of Medicine
- History: 1856–2002
- Publisher: BMJ Group
- Frequency: Monthly
- Open access: Yes

Standard abbreviations
- ISO 4: West. J. Med.

Indexing
- CODEN: WJMDA2
- ISSN: 0093-0415 (print); 1476-2978 (web)
- LCCN: 75642547
- OCLC no.: 1799362

Links
- Online archive

The Western Journal of Medicine was a peer-reviewed medical journal. It was established in 1856 as the Transactions of the Medical Society of the State of California. It was renamed California State Journal of Medicine in 1902 and volume numbering was restarted at 1. In 1924 it was renamed California and Western Medicine and in 1946 California Medicine. In 1974, it obtained its final title, Western Journal of Medicine, which was styled as wjm from 1999 on. In 1985, the journal absorbed Arizona Medicine. It ceased publication in 2002 because it was not financially viable any more. The journal was lastly published by the BMJ Group with Michael Wilkes as its editor-in-chief.

== Notable people ==
- Linda Hawes Clever, editor-in-chief, 1991 to 1999.

== Abstracting and indexing ==
The journal was abstracted and indexed by EBSCO databases, Gale databases, MEDLINE, ProQuest, PubMed, and Scopus.
