= Bureau of Labor Standards =

Predecessor agency of the Occupational Safety and Health Administration

The Bureau of Labor Standards was an agency of the U.S. Department of Labor from 1934 until 1971. It was the direct predecessor of the Occupational Safety and Health Administration. The unit was formed as the Division of Labor Standards in November 1934, and renamed the Bureau of Labor Standards in 1948.

== History ==
Creation of the Division of Labor Standards in 1934 was an initiative of Secretary of Labor Frances Perkins, who wanted to set a new course from the relative inactivity of the Department during the anti-labor atmosphere of the 1920s. Much of its early function was working with state labor departments, which had regulatory power, to promote and draft uniform labor laws, organize conferences, and prepare factory inspection manuals and training courses. It also worked with labor unions, safety organizations, and industrial associations. Its formation led to competition with the Public Health Service's Division of Industrial Hygiene over whether a regulatory or advisory agency should coordinate state and local industrial hygiene agencies, with PHS emphasizing a role as a non-partisan provider of scientific data, while the Department of Labor actively advocated for labor unions' efforts to improve work conditions.

Clara Mortenson Beyer was an early administrator of the Division. Beyer served as Associate Director from 1934–1957, and Acting Director for 1957–1958. In 1934, Molly Dewson and Frances Perkins encouraged Beyer to take the new position of Associate Director in the Division of Labor Standards. Beyer was excited about working in the new Bureau because she was eager to build an organization from the beginning. Beyer became an influential voice in New Deal era labor policies. Beyer, Perkins, and Arthur Altmeyer developed provisions that went into the Social Security Act of 1935. Beyer working on American labor issues including apprenticeship, vocational education, and programs for elderly and migrant workers. Perkins told Beyer that it was politically unrealistic for her to appoint another woman to a top job in an important Labor Department organization, otherwise she might have promoted Beyer further. Beyer apparently happily accepted this.

The Walsh–Healey Public Contracts Act of 1936 established labor standards for government contracts in excess of $10,000, and included the first mandatory standards for safety and health to be adopted by the federal government, through the influence of the Division of Labor Standards.

Beyer's most recognized achievement at the Bureau of Labor Standards is her instrumental work towards the establishment of the Fair Labor Standards Act of 1938, which set minimum wage and maximum hour standards nationwide. Beyer's bureau helped Ben Cohen and Thomas Corcoran draft the legislation, and when Beyer herself was resisted by organized laborers who worried that minimum wage would lower wages overall, she worked with Congresswoman Mary T. Norton to lobby William Green, president of the American Federation of Labor. With his support, the law passed, and when the act was challenged and appealed to the Supreme Court, Beyer helped prepare the government's successful defense.

In July 1946, the Division absorbed the Industrial Division from the Children's Bureau. Some tasks were added the Bureau's agenda by the Longshoreman's and Harbor Workers' Compensation Act of 1958.

The Bureau became a component of the Wage and Labor Standards Administration when the latter was formed in 1967. In 1971, the Bureau of Labor Standards became the Occupational Safety and Health Administration.
