= National Institutes of Health campus =

US government facility in Bethesda, Maryland

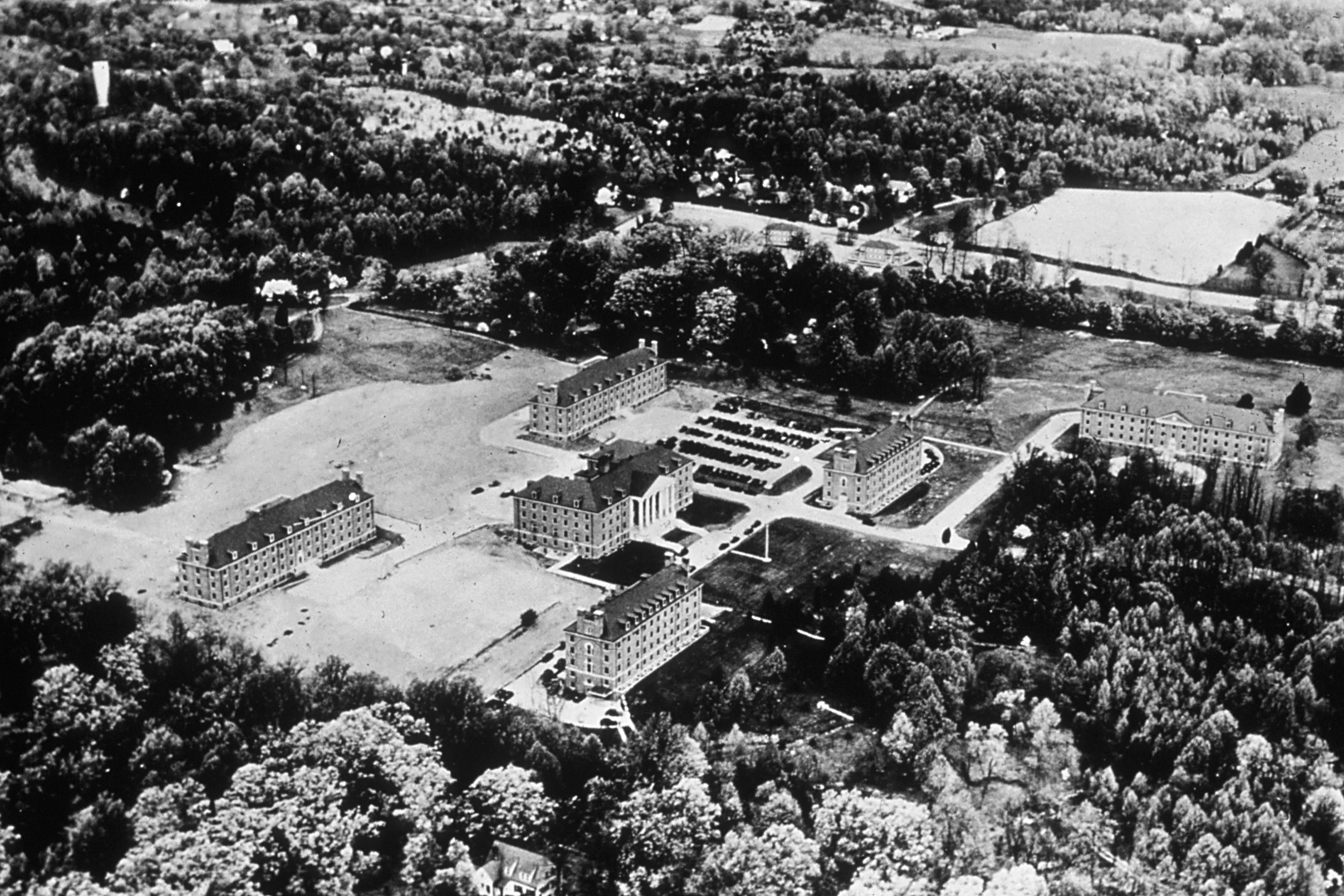
Aerial view of the NIH campus in 1940

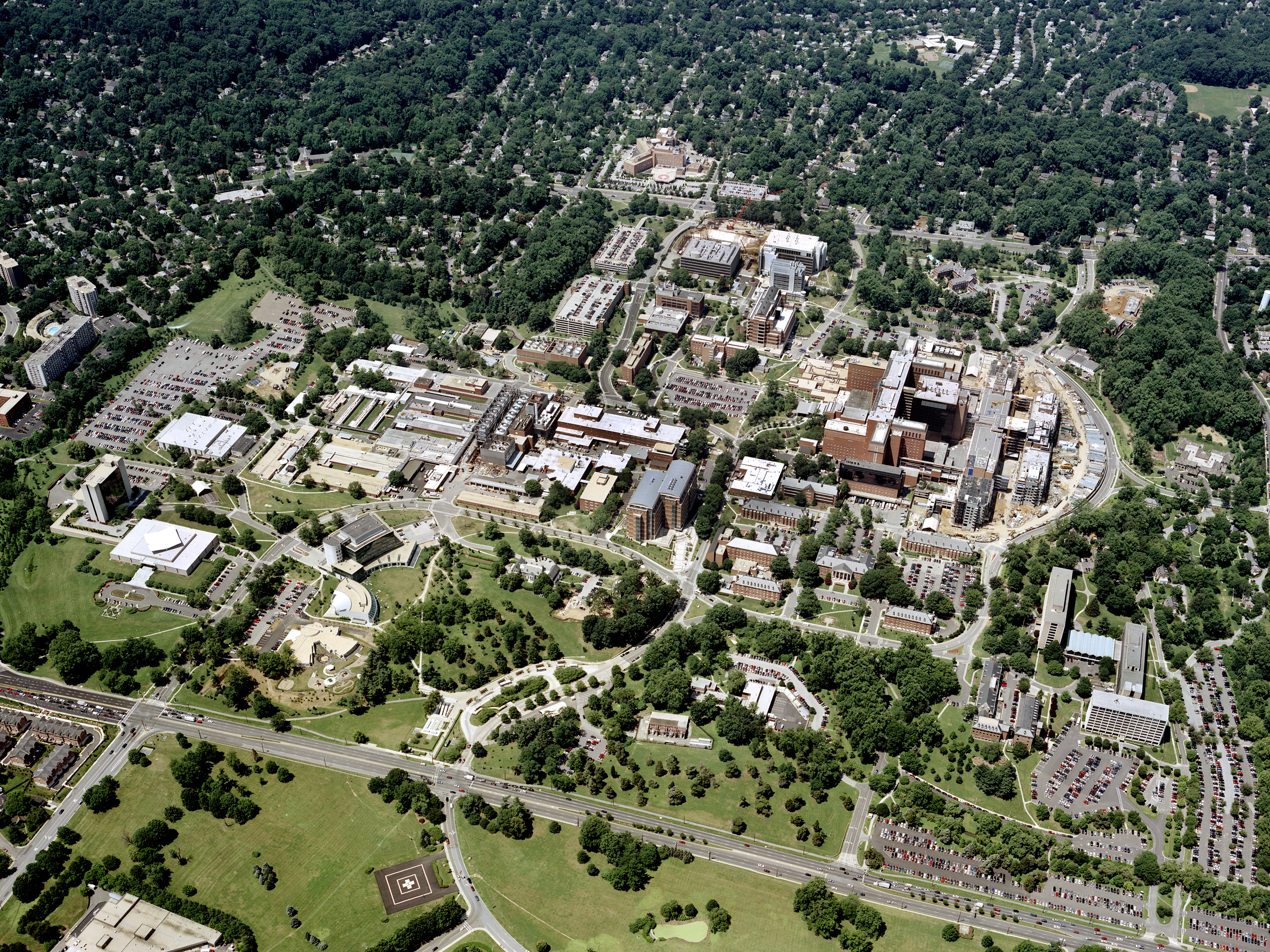
Aerial view of the NIH campus in 2003

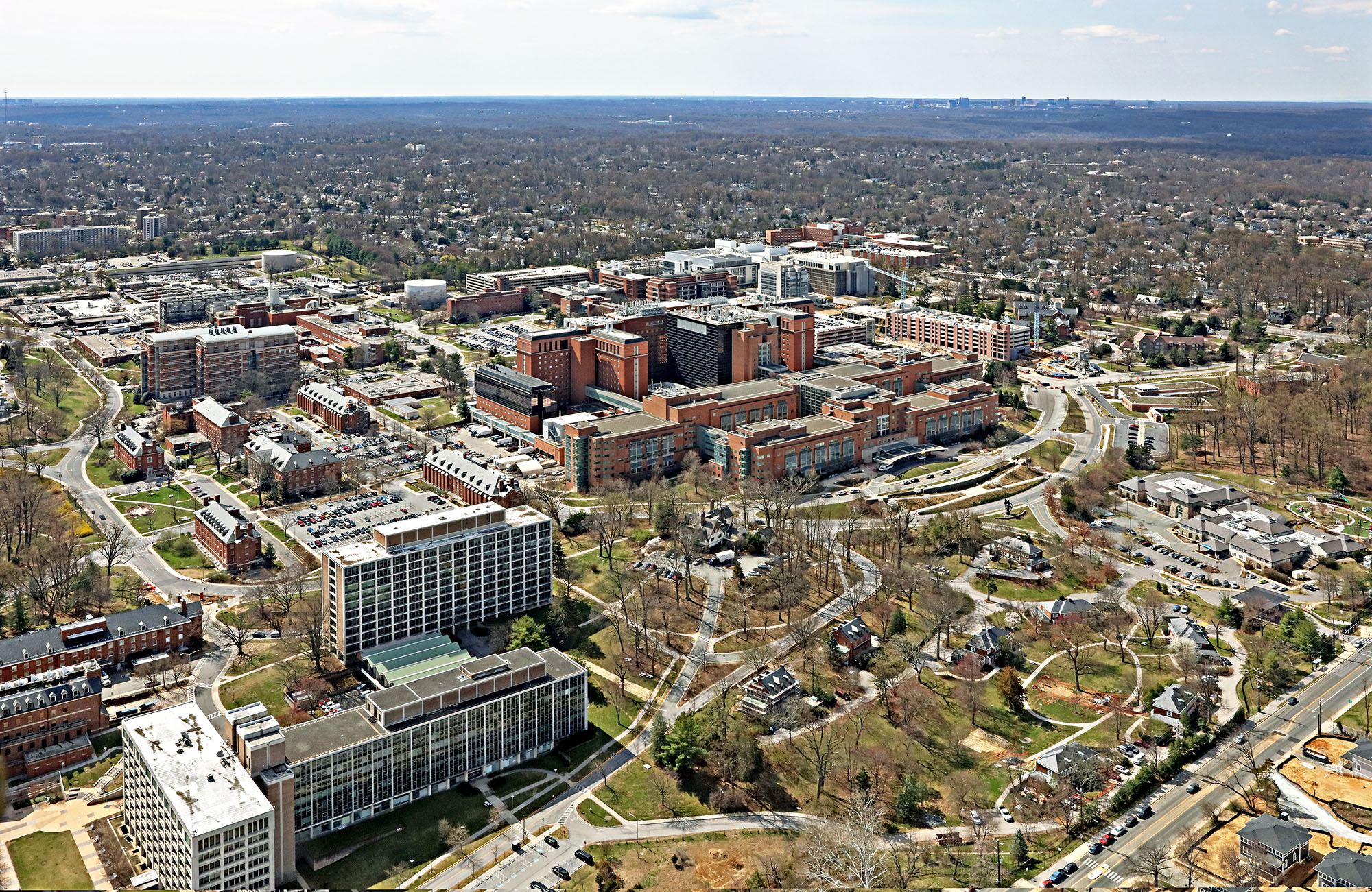
National Institutes of Health

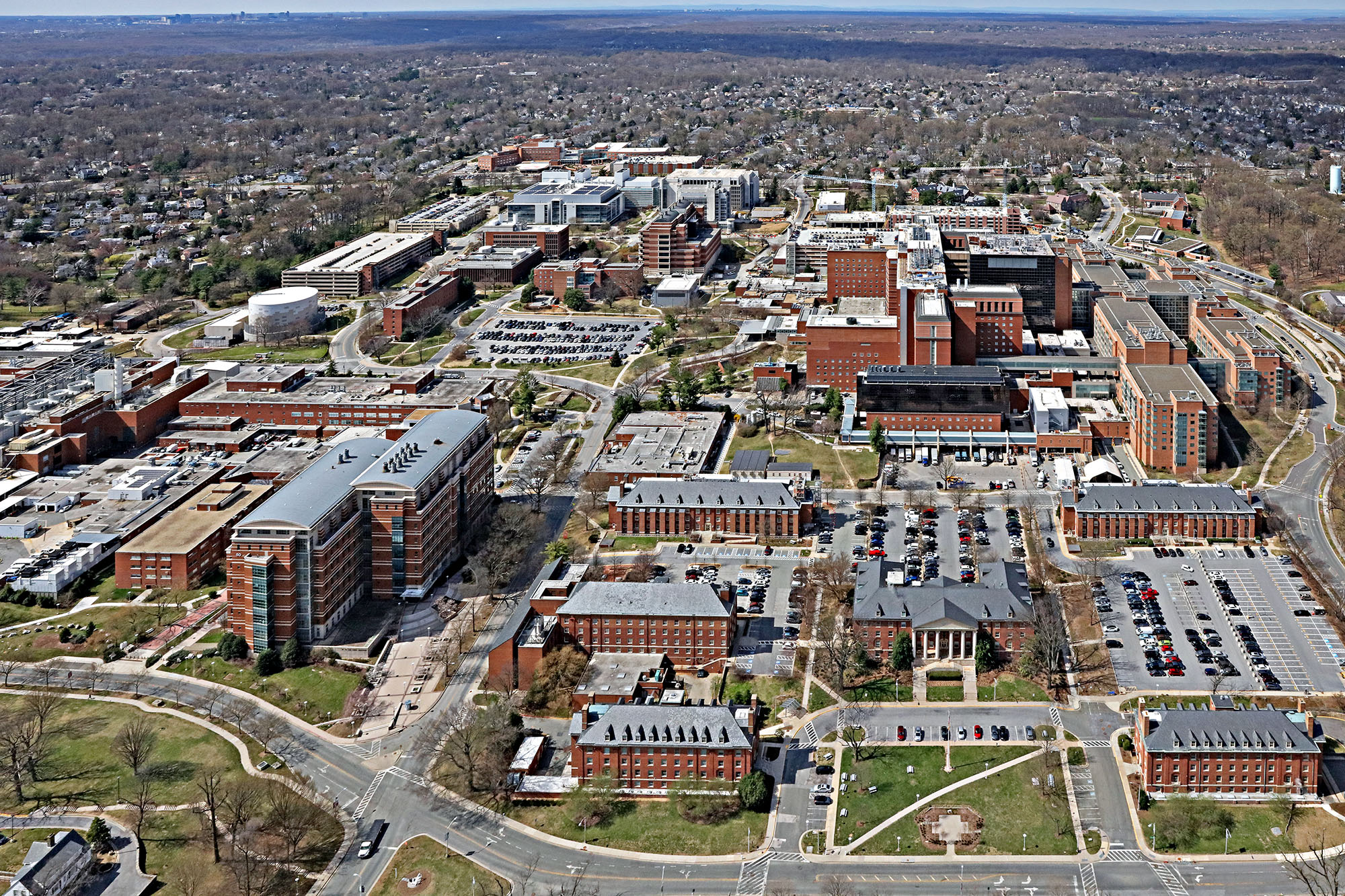
National Institutes of Health, Looking West

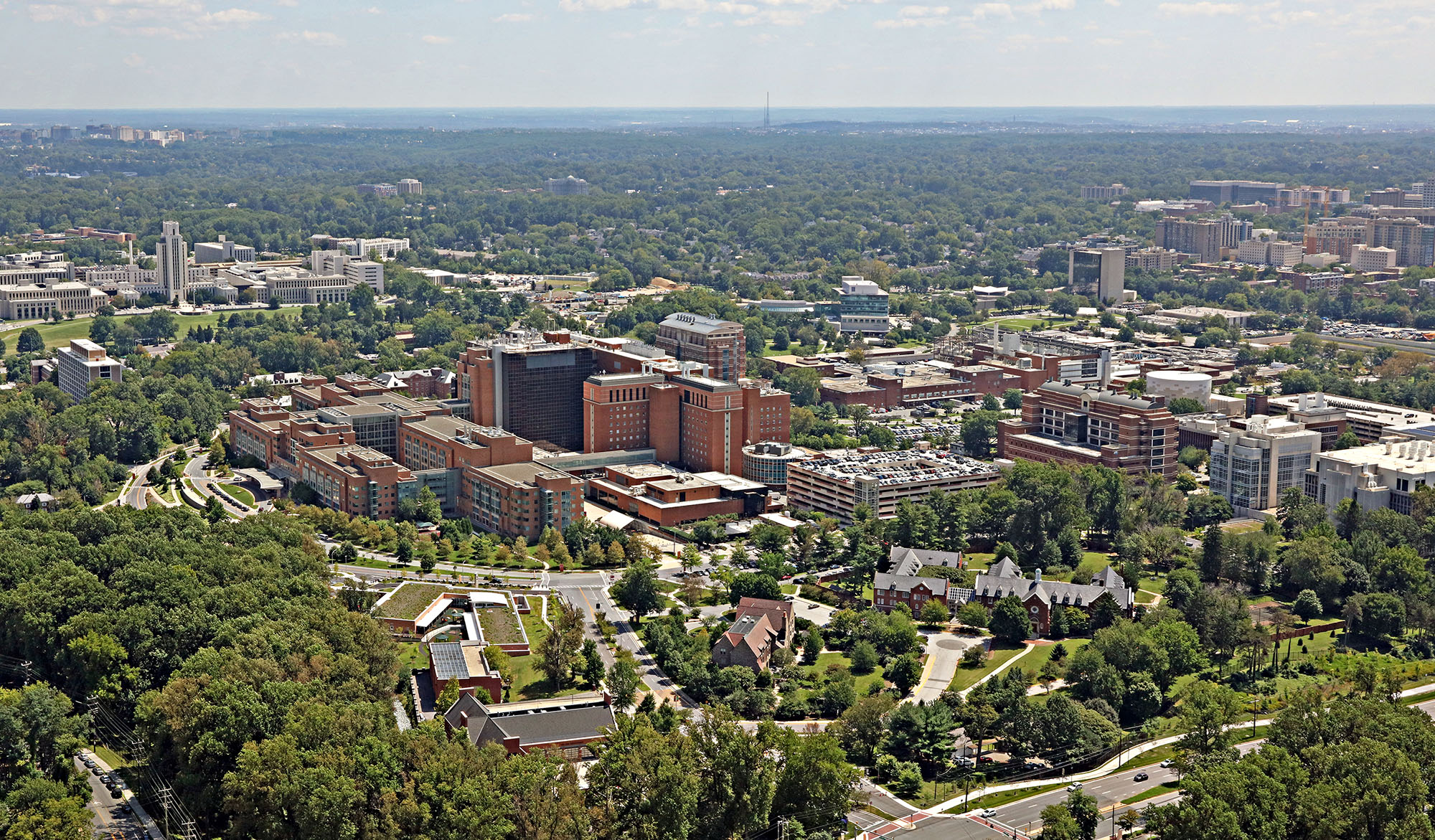
National Institutes of Health, Looking Southeast

The National Institutes of Health campus is located in Bethesda, Maryland. Most National Institutes of Health (NIH) agencies house their Divisions of Intramural Research on this campus spread out among various buildings.

== Location ==
The campus is located between Old Georgetown Road to the west, Wisconsin Avenue to the east, West Cedar Lane to the North, and downtown Bethesda to the south. The Walter Reed National Military Medical Center is located directly across Wisconsin Ave. from the campus, and the Washington, D.C. border is less than three miles to the south. The Medical Center Washington Metro stop is located just beyond the campus fence along Wisconsin Ave.

== History ==
The Bethesda campus has been occupied since 1938 when the original National Institute of Health began to expand outside of Washington, D.C. The Clinical Center, Building 10, opened in 1953 with 540 beds, thus allowing for clinical research. Launched in the wake of Nazi medical experiments done during World War II, research protocols here fell under ethical review by a review board.

== Buildings ==
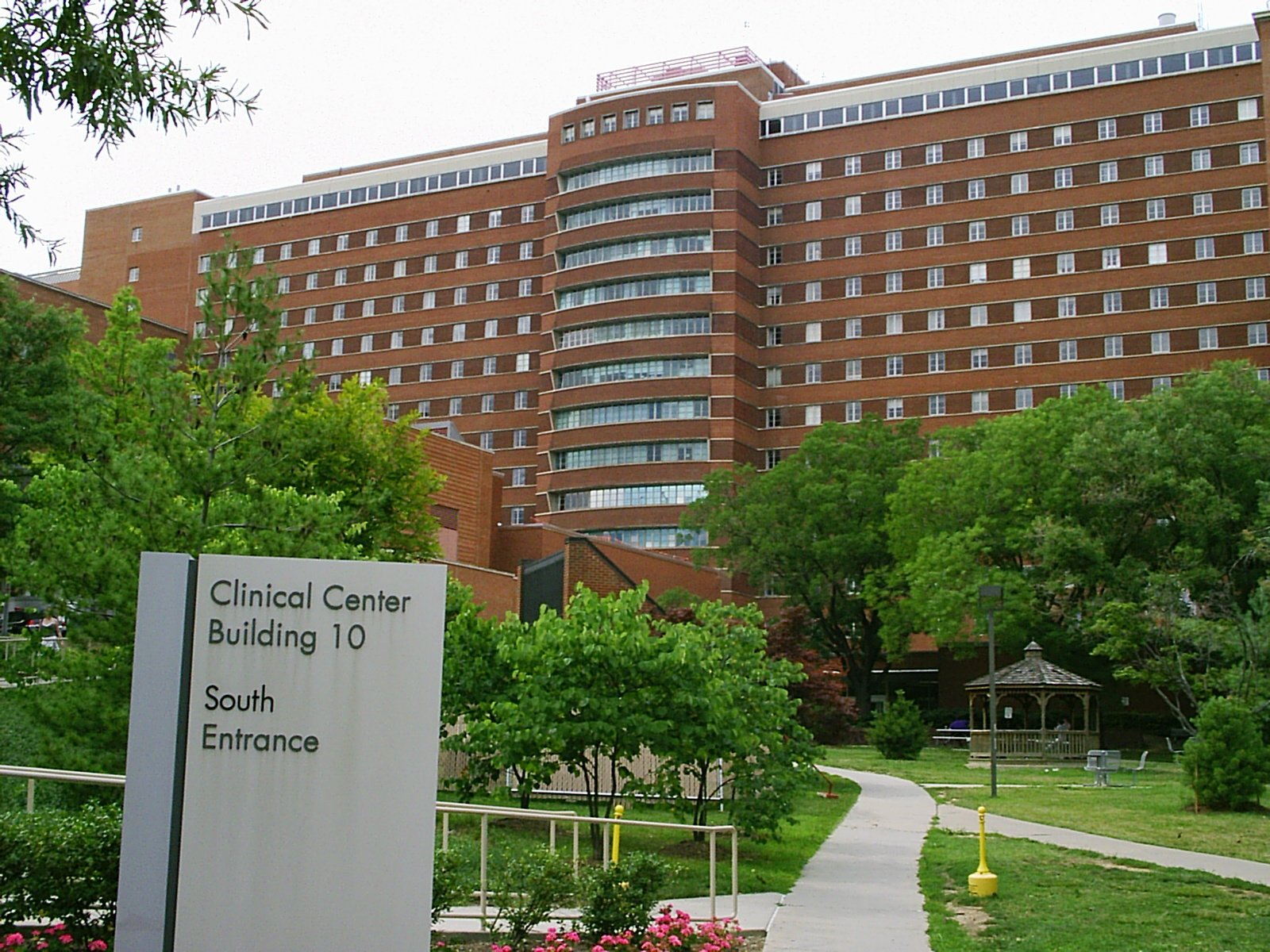
Clinical Center, Building 10

There are over fifty buildings on the Bethesda campus with designated numbers.

== Security ==
As a federal government facility housing sensitive research, the Bethesda campus has security measures for the safety of employees, patients, and visitors. A Department of Health and Human Services identification card is needed for immediate access. Visitors must have a government issued photo ID for a pass, and their vehicles and/or persons undergo inspections.

== See also ==
- National Institutes of Health
- Bethesda, Maryland
