= 184 38th Street =

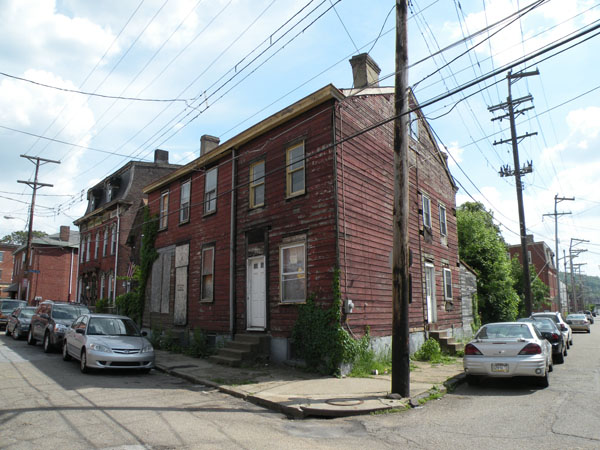

- Location within Pittsburgh Location within Pennsylvania Location within the United States

General information
- Type: log home
- Architectural style: Vernacular architecture
- Location: 38th and Charlotte Streets; Lawrenceville, Pittsburgh
- Coordinates: 40°28′1.9″N 79°57′54.0″W
- Cost: $43,000 (2011)

Technical details
- Floor count: 2
- Floor area: 3,740 square feet (347 m^{2})

184 38th Street, also known as McBride Log House, was a historic log house in the Lawrenceville neighborhood of Pittsburgh, Pennsylvania. Before its demolition, it was thought to be the oldest log house in any major American city to be used as a residence.

Dating to the 1820s, it was one of the original buildings in Lawrenceville. Several attempts were made by historical groups to restore the building, but such efforts were cost prohibitive. The building continued to be used as a residence until the early 21st century, when it was purchased by a real estate developer. In 2011, the building was demolished.

== Building history ==
The building was constructed in the 1820s by Henry McBride, who purchased the property directly from Lawrenceville founder William Foster for $250 in 1822. At that time, Lawrenceville consisted of little more than several buildings centered around the Allegheny Arsenal. On September 17, 1862, Catherine Burkhart, a 15-year-old girl who lived in the home with her mother, was killed in an explosion at the Allegheny Arsenal, where she worked assembling munitions for the Union Army. (Note: The explosion killed 70 munition workers at the Allegheny Arsenal, mostly young girls; it was the largest civilian death tally of the American Civil War.)

In May 2007, the building was cited for rotting window frames, deteriorating exterior walls, and crumbling wood under the roof; by December 2007, the building had passed inspection. It was boarded up in 2008 to prevent vandalism and squatters. In April 2011, a real estate agent from the North Hills of Pittsburgh purchased the building for $43,000. (Note: Allegheny County assesses the property at $13,300.)

== Specifications ==
The two story, two family building contained 12 rooms and roughly 3,740 square feet (347 m^{2}) of space. It was constructed using a framing technique. The logs were squared-off, rather than the stereotypical Lincoln Logs-style.

A fire in 2004 exposed the original logs; the extent of the historical significance of the building was not widely known until then. The asphalt siding was then removed from the outside of the building. As of 2011, the clapboards were peeling and showing the original logs underneath.

== Preservation efforts ==
After the 2004 fire, the Lawrenceville Historical Society began trying to find a way to preserve the building, but the society was unable to raise the necessary funds to purchase the building outright.

In late 2006, the Lawrenceville Historical Society commissioned a study that estimated that the cost to restore the house as a history museum would cost $250,000. Other studies have estimated the cost of restoration at greater than $200,000, not including the purchase price.

The building was placed on the market in November 2008 with an asking price of $79,900. At the time, the property owners, investors in a limited partnership, hoped to find "the right buyer who will treat it with the respect it deserves." In 2008, Lawrenceville United executive director Tony Ceoffe described the dilapidated structure as a "terrible eyesore" and went on to say that neighbors were claiming it attracted vagrants and drug users. The Log House Committee of the Lawrenceville Stakeholders, led by a local architect, made an unsuccessful attempt to purchase and restore the property.

In 2011, Arthur P. Ziegler, Jr., noted preservationist and president of Pittsburgh History and Landmarks Foundation, expressed hope that the house could be restored, but expressed doubts about the feasibility, due to the cost.

Following the purchase of the building in 2011, the Lawrenceville Stakeholders expressed fear that the new owner would demolish the building. When contacted by a reporter from the Pittsburgh Post-Gazette, the owner indicated that there were no immediate plans for the property. Cochran expressed hope that the new owner would recognize the historic potential of the home and believed that a restored home of this age could be a "gold mine" as a single family residence in Lawrenceville, which was developing into a significant social center of Pittsburgh. Modifications made to the house since its construction, including 1830s cuts through the original logs to create windows, would have complicated any efforts to fully restore the building. Observers, including Carol Peterson, Pittsburgh's pre-eminent house historian, believed that the modifications had their own historical significance and should have been preserved in any restoration effort.

In July, the owner demolished the structure, while attempting to preserve the logs, in case the building could be re-assembled elsewhere.

== Gallery ==
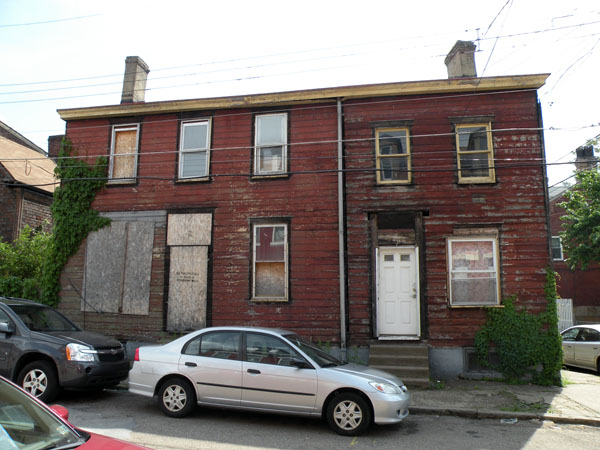
The front of 184 38th Street on May 21, 2011.

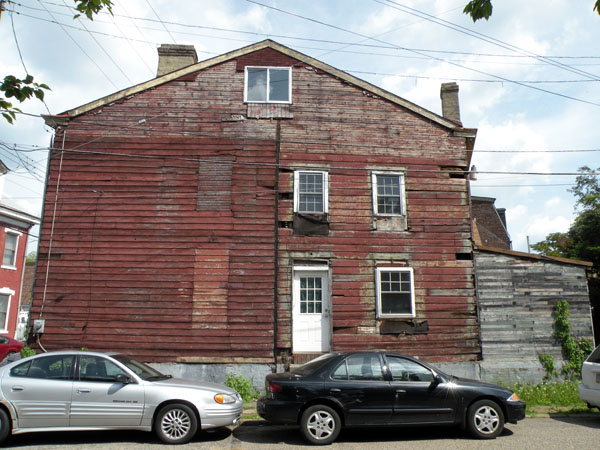
A side view of 184 38th Street.

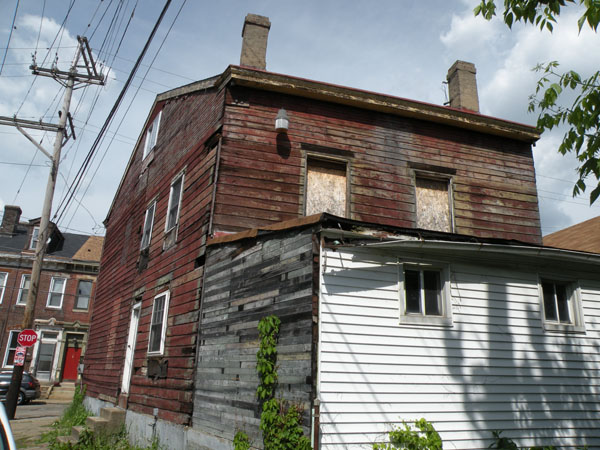
A back view of the building.
