= Occupational health nursing =

Nursing specialty

Occupational health nursing is a specialty nursing practice that provides for and delivers health and safety programs and services to workers, worker populations, and community groups. The practice focuses on promotion, maintenance and restoration of health, prevention of illness and injury, and protection from work‐related and environmental hazards. Occupational health nurses (OHNs) aim to combine knowledge of health and business to balance safe and healthful work environments and a "healthy" bottom line.

Occupation health nursing can be found in almost every major healthcare facility. Saldana, Pimentel, and Posada describe occupation health as a niche in nursing that specializes in assessing and evaluating the "health status" of employees and function to maintain the highest level of well-being of the workforce. The key components of occupational health nursing involves prevention of illness and injury in the workplace, health and wellness, protection, and education. Nurses in occupational health also have a role in implementing research projects and incorporating evidence based practice into clinical practice. Occupational health nursing is an important niche and works to protect and promote the wellbeing of the community and workforce.

== National histories and training requirements ==
=== In the United States ===
In the United States the role of the occupational health nurse started in 1888. A nurse named Betty Moulder was hired by multiple coal mining companies in Pennsylvania to take care of their employees and families because of the conditions at the workplace. Because of this many people consider Pennsylvania as the birthplace of occupational health nursing. Through the years occupational health nursing grew in order to fight against infectious diseases and health issues related to labor shortages. Today employees with poor health will cost companies one trillion dollars.

OHNs are hired by companies within the United States in order to decrease job related injuries and absentee percentages. According to the CDC (2017), studies have shown that occupational health nurses provide significant financial benefits to employers and their employees. As of 2012, there were approximately 19,000 occupational health nurses in the U.S. Occupational health nurse training in the U.S. is supported by the National Institute for Occupational Safety and Health through the NIOSH Education and Research Centers.

OHNs need a license in the state they practice. Nurses usually have a baccalaureate in nursing and experience in community health, ambulatory care, critical care or emergency care. Most occupational health nurses get their master's degrees in public health, advanced practice or business to have a higher professional competency.

=== United Kingdom ===
Dorothy Radwanski was the first occupational health nurse based in a major hospital in the United Kingdom, and became Nursing Advisor to several large businesses, including British Leyland. She was the first Chief Nursing Advisor to the Employment Medical Advisory Service (which became the Health and Safety Executive). Radwanski established the Civil Service Occupational Health Service and consulted and advised on the creation of other major government departments and for the Nigerian health services.

In the UK today, OHNs must be registered on part 1 of the Nursing and Midwifery Council register. Registered nurses can take apprenticeships or an approved programme in Specialist Community Public Health Nursing to become an OHN.

== Roles and Responsibilities ==
The role of the OHN encompasses a range of responsibilities. OHNs might carry out pre-employment medical checks, care for people who become injured or ill at work, provide counselling, give advice and educate employees on health and safety and sickness absence, and perform risk assessments and maintain records for employees and businesses.

OHNs routinely coordinate and manage the care of ill and injured workers. Occupational Health Nurses' role as case managers has grown as they now assist with the coordination and management of work-related and non-work related injuries and illness, which includes group health, worker's compensation (and Family Medical Leave Act in the USA) as well as short/long term disability.

OHNs develop programs that promote lifestyle change and individual efforts that lower risk of disease and injury. OHNs also assist in creating environments that provide a sense of balance among work, family, personal, health and psychosocial concerns. Additional strategies to assist in health promotion to keep workers healthy and productive include immunizations, smoking cessation, exercise/fitness, nutrition and weight control, stress management, chronic disease management, and use of medical services.

Occupational Health Nurses (OHNs) offer counseling to workers for common challenges such as work-related issues and injuries. They also provide counseling for other issues such as substance abuse, psychological issues, concerns for health and wellness, etc. OHNs can also manage employee assistance programs, take charge of referrals, and coordinate follow-up of community resources.

OHNs can detect hazards or potential hazards in the workplace. They are able to conduct research in order to monitor, evaluate, and analyze certain hazardous elements (AAOHN, n.d.). Conducting research assists in developing a safety plan and implementing preventative and control measures (AAOHN, n.d.). Examples of workplace hazards include toxic chemical exposure, confined spaces, frayed cords, infectious material exposure, extreme heat/cold conditions, and injuries such as falls. It is important to detect patterns and implement changes to promote a safer workplace environment.

== Future of Occupational Health Nursing ==
Occupational Health is projected to grow by 12% 2022. Health and wellness in the workplace areas becoming more important than ever. Healthcare reform is set to improve access to deliver healthcare services for all individuals. The demand for occupational health nurses will increase due to the reform. Workplaces today have rising insurance costs and worker compensation cases, this creates a need for qualified occupational health nurses who understand the healthcare market. Most cooperation's have incorporated a wellness program to help decrease employee related injury and illness. Also, many companies are taking precautions to prevent lawsuits.
