= Wyman Park Building =

Building of Johns Hopkins University in Baltimore, Maryland

Coordinates: 39.3252°N 76.6228°W

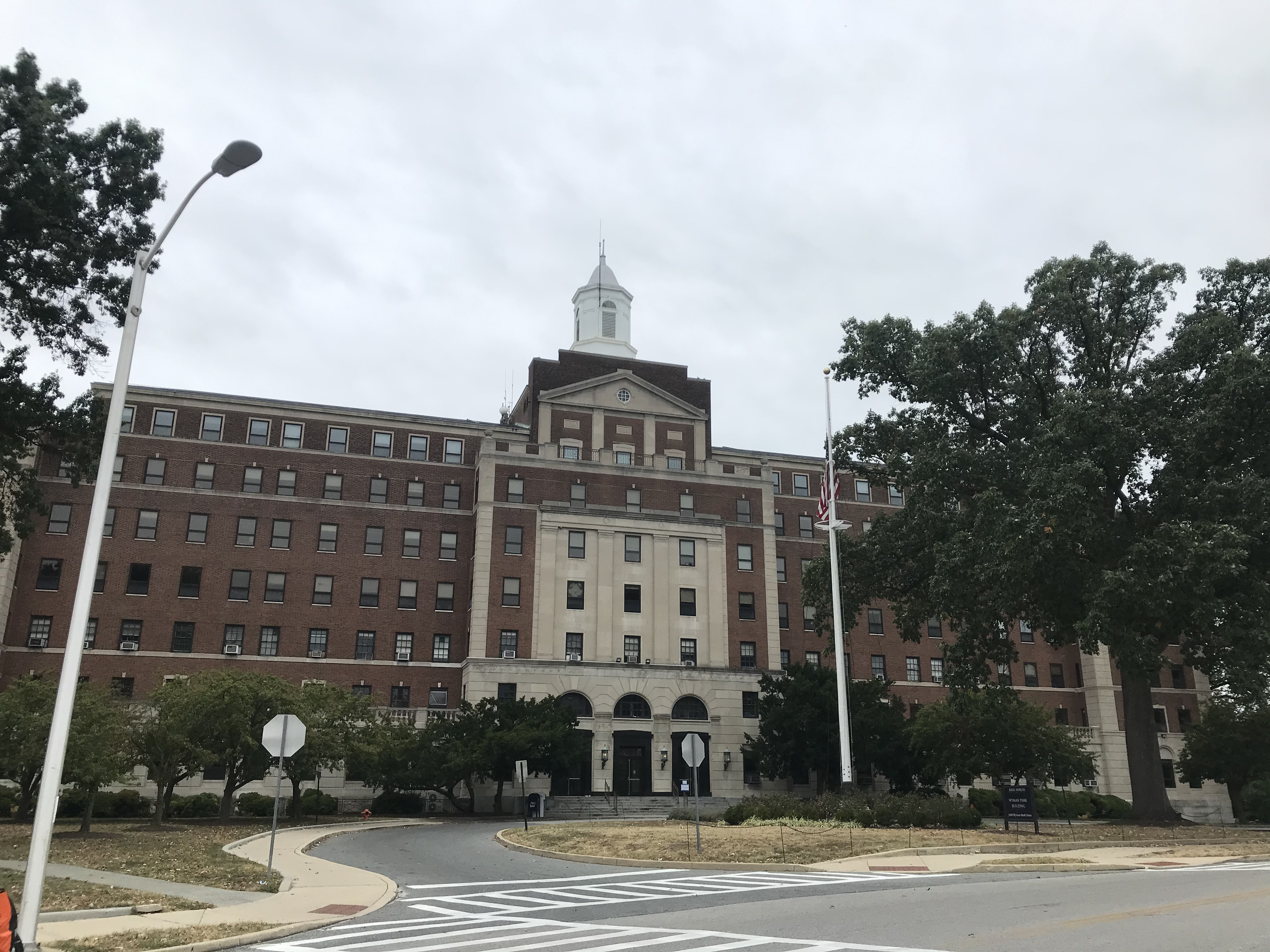
The main Wyman Park Building in 2019

The Wyman Park Building is an office building in the Wyman Park neighborhood of Baltimore, Maryland, United States. It is currently owned by Johns Hopkins University.

It originally served as the United States Marine Hospital in Baltimore, which opened on the site in 1887. The current buildings were constructed in 1934. It was part of the U.S. Marine Hospital system, which was run by the Marine Hospital Service and its successor the Public Health Service, primarily for the benefit of the civilian merchant marine.

After the Marine Hospital system closed in 1981, the buildings were eventually acquired by Johns Hopkins University. In 1987, plans were approved to demolish the building and replace it with a medical campus of taller buildings. However, in 2019, this plan was rescinded and the building was subsequently renovated.

== Background ==
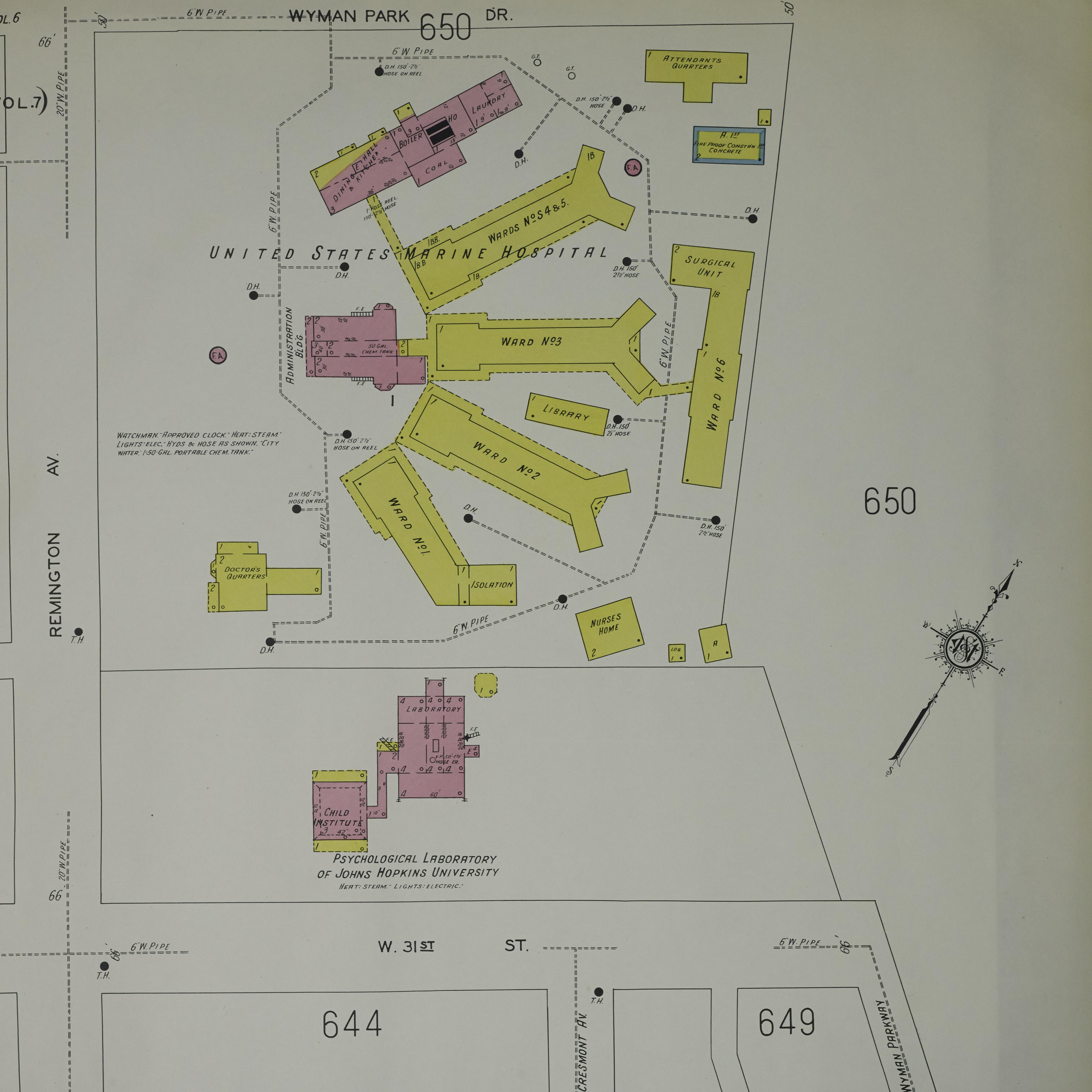
1928 Sanborn Map showing the buildings of the original hospital campus after its expansion

As of 1878, there had never been a U.S. Marine Hospital in Baltimore despite its status as a major port. (There was an unrelated city-owned hospital coincidentally named "Marine Hospital" that operated in Curtis Bay from 1845 to 1897.) Sick seamen had been treated at private hospitals contracted by the government, including one operated by Tobias Watkins in the early 19th century.

The Baltimore U.S. Marine Hospital opened in 1887 on a 6-acre (24,000 m^{2}) plot in the Wyman Park neighborhood. It was built in the pavilion hospital style with wooden and brick structures in a setting landscaped with trees and shrubs.

The hospital was closed in July 1920 because it had fallen into disrepair, and was leased to the City of Baltimore to house smallpox patients. The Marine Hospital patients were transferred to Fort McHenry Hospital, which the Marine Hospital Service paid to renovate into a 2,000-bed facility, after which the Army demanded to take the facility back. The original hospital reopened in May 1923 after being expanded with four new wards, which doubled its capacity, as well as a new nurses' home and power plant.

== Current building ==
=== Marine Hospital ===
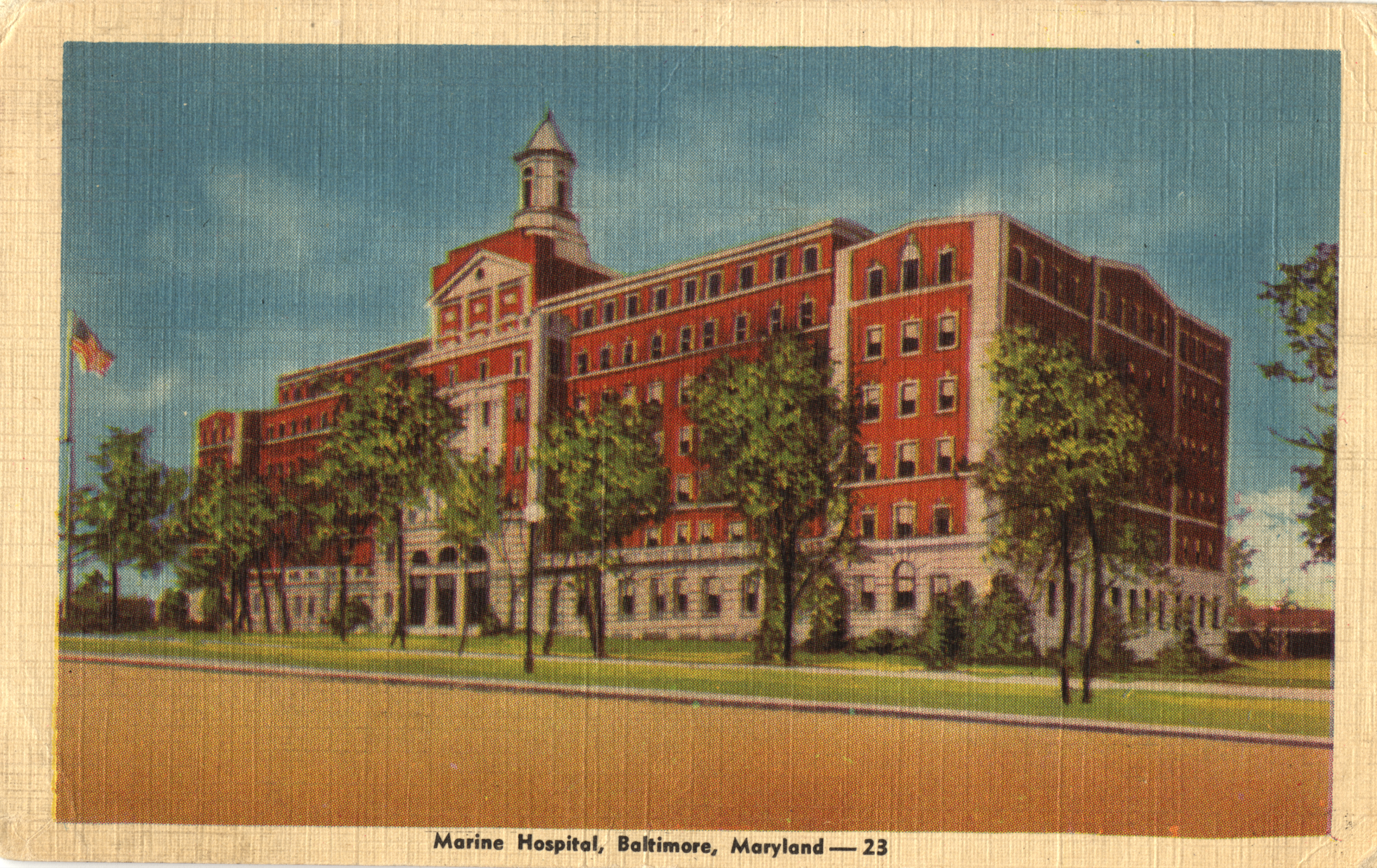
Historic postcard of the hospital

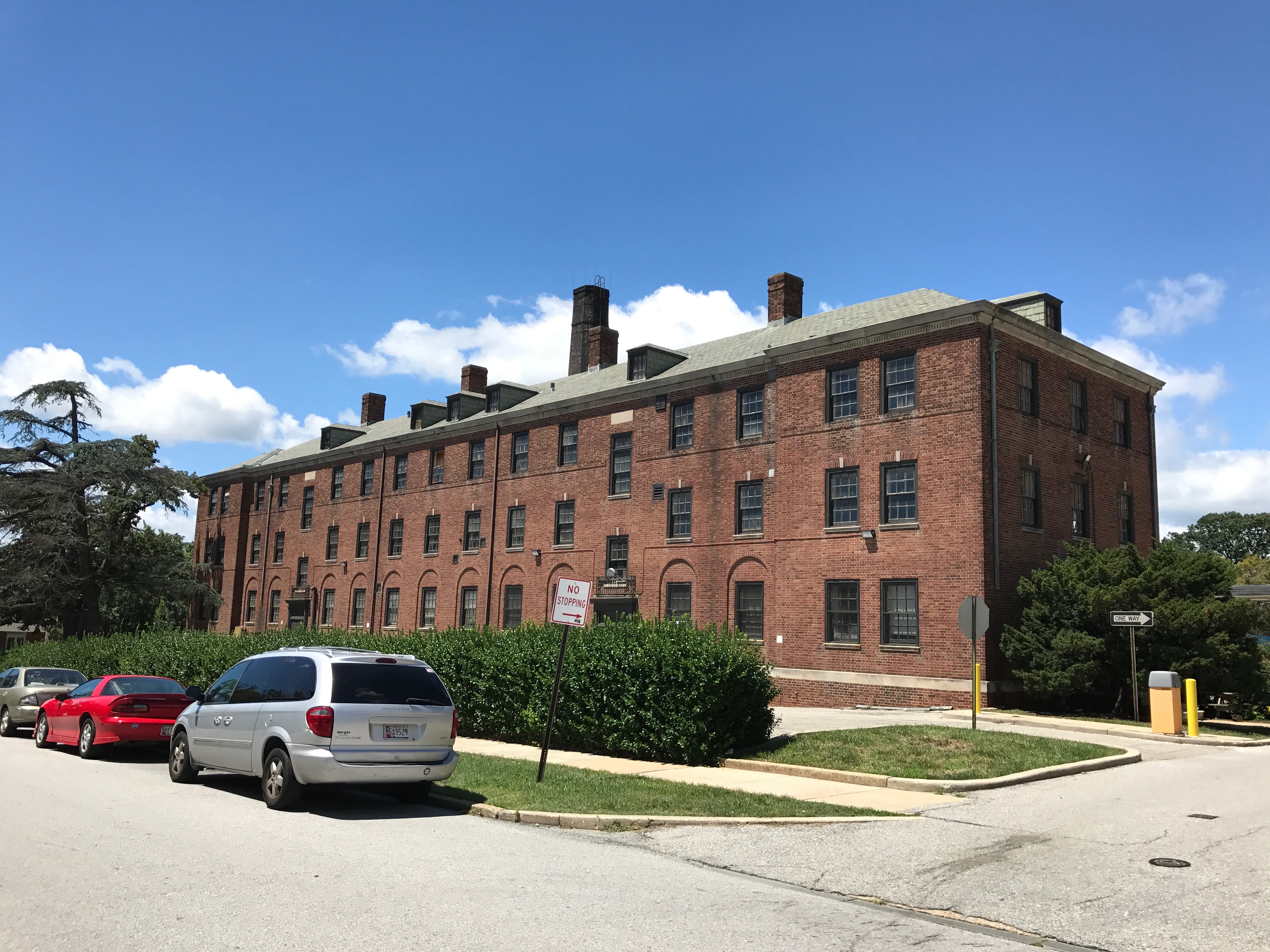
Wyman Building 2 in 2017

The current main building was constructed in 1934 on the same site as the old hospital. It was a 290-bed facility with around 170,000 square feet (16,000 m^{2}) of floor space, and was the second-largest Marine Hospital in the country. In its early years, the hospital carried out activities in tumor and cardiovascular research in cooperation with the National Institutes of Health.

By 1950, the campus included several outbuildings: a nurses' home, several doctor's residences featuring exterior woodwork and ironwork, a segregated residence for African-American employees, and an industrial building containing a boiler room, laundry, and garage. That year, the hospital's capacity was 508 beds.

After a wave of hospital closings between 1965 and 1970, only eight general hospitals in the system remained in operation, including the Baltimore hospital. In 1980, it ran the only Federal education program for medical record administration, and was one of two primary sites along with the Seattle Marine Hospital for health services research using computers.

=== Later history ===
All eight remaining general hospitals were closed in 1981 by the Reagan administration and transferred to other organizations. The Baltimore hospital became a private health provider called Wyman Park Health System, which in 1987 merged with Johns Hopkins Community Physicians. In 2016, the health providers moved to another facility, leaving the building to Johns Hopkins University for offices.

In 1987, the Baltimore City Council approved a planned unit development requested by Johns Hopkins to allow it to demolish the building and replace it with a medical campus of taller buildings. Soon after, the buildings on the north part of the campus including the nurses' and doctor's residences were demolished to build a parking structure. A 2008 master plan reflected that the intention was still to demolish the building.

However, in 2019 Johns Hopkins decided instead to renovate the historic building, and the Baltimore City Council revoked the planned unit development at Johns Hopkins' request. The building was renovated during 2021–2023, which included a core building addition.
