= List of U.S. Marine Hospitals =

Former system of hospitals

This is a list of U.S. Marine Hospitals and Public Health Service Hospitals that operated during the system's existence from 1798 to 1981. The primary beneficiary of the hospitals were civilian mariners known as the Merchant Marine, although they had other beneficiaries at various times; the system was unrelated to the United States Marine Corps.

The Marine Hospital Fund was founded in 1798; it was reorganized into the Marine Hospital Service in 1871 and renamed the United States Public Health Service in 1912. The hospital system became part of the Public Health Service's Bureau of Medical Services when it was created in 1943. The number of major hospitals peaked at thirty in 1943, and declined to nine in 1970. The system was abolished in 1981. Many of the hospitals were transferred to other organizations and are still in use as a variety of purposes, including as hospitals, offices, apartments, and historical sites.

== History ==
Locations of Marine Hospitals opened prior to 1872. The hospitals still operating in 1872 are marked in blue.
Locations of major PHS hospitals in 1936. The cities that retained PHS hospitals after 1953 are marked in yellow, and those that retained them after 1970 are marked in blue.

The Marine Hospital Fund was founded in 1798, when John Adams signed into law, An Act for the relief of sick and disabled seamen. Although the system was funded and largely operated by the federal government, they were locally managed with little centralized oversight, and with many positions filled through political patronage. In 1871, it was reorganized into a centralized administration, the Marine Hospital Service, led by the Surgeon General and staffed by a Commissioned Corps of officers.

As of 1873, 31 Marine Hospitals had been built by the government, of which 10 remained in operation: Chelsea, Chicago, Cleveland, Detroit, Louisville, Mobile, Pittsburgh, Portland, St. Louis, and Key West. Of the rest, fourteen were sold, one was transferred to the War Department, one abandoned, one burned, one destroyed by a flood, one by a hurricane, one was damaged by an earthquake and abandoned; one remained unfinished due to its completion being impracticable.

Over the late nineteenth century, the Marine Hospital Service was given authority over domestic and foreign quarantine functions, and expanded into other public health activities. In 1899 it formed internal divisions for the first time, with the Division of Hospitals administering the hospital system. The Marine Hospital Service changed its name to the Public Health Service (PHS) in 1912.

At the end of World War I, PHS instituted a numbering system for hospitals, with numbers 1–23 assigned alphabetically to major Marine Hospitals that were operating or recently closed, with higher numbers going to a large number of new Public Health Service Hospitals at facilities transferred from the U.S. Army. Many of these new hospitals were transferred in 1922 to the newly created Veterans Bureau, which assumed responsibility for veterans' health benefits from the PHS.

Beginning in the late 1920s and continuing through the New Deal era, a significant building campaign upgraded several hospitals into large, monumental buildings, in contrast with the smaller buildings common for the 19th-century buildings. By 1936, hospitals were divided into first-class Marine Hospitals, plus second- through fourth-class hospitals.

In 1943, PHS collected its divisions into three operating agencies, and the Division of Hospitals became part of the Bureau of Medical Services. That year, the hospital system had reached its peak of 30 hospitals. In 1951, all hospitals were redesignated Public Health Service Hospitals. As of 1957, the Division of Hospitals operated 13 hospitals, 24 outpatient clinics, plus two neuropsychiatric hospitals and the National Leprosarium, and contracted with 155 other locations. In 1965, there were 12 general hospitals and the 3 special hospitals.

During the PHS reorganizations of 1966–1973, The Bureau of Medical Services was broken up, and the Division of Hospitals became the Federal Health Programs Service, and then in 1973 became a different Bureau of Medical Services within the Health Services Administration.

The system came under pressure for closure starting in the late 1970s, as healthcare needs for sailors were dwindling, and healthcare for veterans was being taken over by the Veterans Administration. The PHS hospital system was finally abolished during the Reagan administration in 1981, with the last eight general hospitals transferred to other organizations. The federal government would however continue to operate the National Leprosarium until 1999.

== List ==
The start year indicates when the hospital opened or was acquired by MHS/PHS. The end year indicates when the hospital was closed, converted to a clinic, or transferred to another organization. This list emphasizes hospitals considered major at some point in the system's history; there were also very many hospitals of lower statuses.

Photo	Location (link to hospital)	Start	End	Status	Notes	Refs
=== East Coast ===
	Portland, Maine	1859	1952	Extant	In use as private medical facility	
	Boston / Chelsea, Massachusetts	1800	1804		The first Marine Hospital established; temporary location in rebuilt barracks at Castle Island	
	Boston / Chelsea, Massachusetts	1804	1825	Demolished	At Charlestown Navy Yard; transferred to the Navy and demolished	
	Boston / Chelsea, Massachusetts	1825	1827		Temporary rented facility in Charlestown	
	Boston / Chelsea, Massachusetts	1827	1857	Destroyed	In Chelsea; after being sold, it was used as the Hawthorne School and then burned in the 1908 Chelsea fire.	
	Boston / Chelsea, Massachusetts	1857	1940	Extant	Built near Chelsea Naval Hospital; in use as apartments	
	Boston / Chelsea, Massachusetts	1940	1981	Extant	In Brighton; in use as private hospital facility	
	Vineyard Haven, Massachusetts	1879	1952	Extant	In use as Martha's Vineyard Museum	
	Newport, Rhode Island	ca. 1802			May have been temporary	
	Stapleton, Staten Island, New York	1831	1981	Extant	Notable for the 1858 Staten Island Quarantine War at a satellite location, and being the birthplace of the National Institutes of Health in 1887	
	Stapleton, Staten Island, New York	1930s	1981	Extant	In use as Bayley Seton Hospital	
	Neponsit, Queens, New York	1945	1950	Demolished	Leased from City of New York and replaced by Manhattan Beach hospital; demolished in 2023	
	Manhattan Beach, Brooklyn, New York	1941	1960		Shut down and sold off by USCG	
	Ellis Island, New York	1902	1951	Extant	Ellis Island Immigrant Hospital	
	Cape Henlopen, Delaware	1894	1903			
	Baltimore, Maryland	1887	1934	Demolished	Demolished for construction of 1934 building on same site	
	Baltimore, Maryland	1934	1981	Extant	Became a private hospital, now an academic building for Johns Hopkins University named Wyman Park Building	
	Washington, D.C.	1940	1961– 1967	Extant	Freedmen's Hospital; previously operated by Department of the Interior; became Howard University Hospital	
	Washington, D.C.	1940	1968	Extant	St. Elizabeths Hospital. Opened 1855 and was operated by the U.S. Army and then the Department of the Interior, transferred to PHS in 1940, and then to the National Institute of Mental Health in 1968; the eastern half of the campus is now operated by the District of Columbia, while the western half is now the headquarters of the Department of Homeland Security	
	Norfolk, Virginia	1800	1860s	Demolished	Built in 1787 by the State of Virginia, transferred to the federal government in 1800, sold off shortly after the Civil War, demolished in 1933	
	Norfolk, Virginia	1922	1981	Extant	In use as U.S. Navy Lafeyette River Annex	
	Portsmouth, North Carolina	1847			Abandoned before 1869	
	Wilmington, North Carolina	1881	1898		Constructed in 1860 but taken over by the Confederacy, and later became first site of Wilmington City Hospital; repurchased and used as Marine Hospital	
	Wilmington, North Carolina	1898	1918		Converted to PHS laboratory	
	Charleston, South Carolina	1833		Extant	NRHP-listed	
	Savannah, Georgia	1906	1969	Extant	In use as Bradley Hall of Savannah College of Art and Design	
	San Juan, Puerto Rico		1952			
=== Gulf Coast ===
	Key West, Florida	1845	1943	Extant		
	St. Marks, Florida	1859	ca. 1861	Demolished	State park museum currently exists on its site	
	Pensacola, Florida				First planned in 1840s and 1850s but never built	
	Mobile, Alabama	1843	1952	Extant	Demoted to Class II hospital after Civil War; NRHP-listed	
	New Orleans, Louisiana	1847	1858	Destroyed	Abandoned after floods; destroyed in 1861 explosion	
	New Orleans, Louisiana	N/A	N/A	Demolished	Building partially constructed but never used as Marine Hospital; later used as insane asylum; hospital operated out of several temporary locations	
	New Orleans, Louisiana	1883	1933	Demolished	Demolished and replaced with current building on same site	
	New Orleans, Louisiana	1933	1981	Extant	part of NRHP-listed Uptown New Orleans Historic District	
	Galveston, Texas / Nassau Bay, Texas	1931		Extant	Now in use as apartments	
	Galveston, Texas / Nassau Bay, Texas	1970s	1981	Extant	Nassau Bay hospital opened in 1972 as a private hospital, but went bankrupt a few years later and was taken over by PHS, replacing the Galveston hospital; became Houston Methodist Clear Lake Hospital	
	Fort Worth, Texas	1938	1967	Extant	Narcotics hospital; now a federal prison	
=== Mississippi River ===
	Carville, Louisiana	1921	1999	Extant	National Leprosarium; NRHP-listed	
	Natchez, Mississippi	1852	1867	Destroyed	Leased out after Civil War; became Natchez City Hospital; burned down in 1984	
	Vicksburg, Mississippi	1856	1870	Demolished		
	Napoleon, Arkansas	1855	ca. 1861	Destroyed	Destroyed by flood in 1868	
	Memphis, Tennessee	1884	1965	Extant	NRHP-listed; now Metal Museum	
	Memphis, Tennessee	1937	1965	Extant		
	St. Louis / Kirkwood, Missouri	1858	1939	Demolished	Larger building constructed adjacent in 1882; demolished in 1959	
	St. Louis / Kirkwood, Missouri	1939	1952	Demolished		
	Cairo, Illinois	1886	1919	Demolished		
	Galena, Illinois	1861	1868	Extant	Later used as school and private residence	
	Burlington, Iowa	1858	1865	Demolished		
=== Ohio River ===
	Paducah, Kentucky	1852	1861	Destroyed	During the Civil War, Fort Anderson was constructed around the hospital building, which burned in 1862	
	Evansville, Indiana	1856	1867	Demolished	Demolished around 1912	
	Evansville, Indiana	1892	1947	Demolished	Demolished early 1980s	
	Louisville, Kentucky	1852	1946	Extant	NRHP-listed	
	Louisville, Kentucky	1933	1946	Extant		
	Cincinnati, Ohio	1860	1860	Demolished	Became a military hospital upon completion and was never used as a Marine Hospital, later used by Good Samaritan Hospital; demolished ca. 1970	
	Cincinnati, Ohio	1882	1905	Demolished	Located in former Kilgour Mansion, built around 1815; in 1912 it was reopened as PHS Stream Pollution Investigations Station	
	Lexington, Kentucky	1935	1967	Extant	Narcotics hospital; now a federal prison	
	Pittsburgh, Pennsylvania	1851	1875	Demolished	Demolished in late 1880s	
	Pittsburgh, Pennsylvania	1909	1949	Extant	Converted to clinic, now occupied by Allegheny County Health Department's Frank B. Clack Health Center; part of NRHP-listed Lawrenceville Historic District	
=== Great Lakes ===
	Burlington, Vermont	1858	1866	Destroyed	Never used due to lack of patients; became Home for Destitute Children; burned down in 1893	
	Buffalo, New York	1909	1949	Extant		
	Cleveland, Ohio	1852	1929	Demolished	Sold to Pennsylvania Railroad in 1929 and demolished	
	Cleveland, Ohio	1929	1953	Extant	Became the Fairhill Mental Health Center	
	Detroit, Michigan	1857	1930	Demolished	Main building demolished in 1962; unrelated 1933 building on site NRHP-listed as U.S. Immigration Station Detroit	
	Detroit, Michigan	1930	1969	Demolished	Demolished in 1984	
	Chicago, Illinois	1852	1864	Destroyed	At Fort Dearborn; sold; burned down in 1871 Great Chicago Fire	
	Chicago, Illinois	1873	1965	Demolished	Demolished for Disney Magnet School	
=== Western U.S. ===
	Port Townsend/Port Angeles, Washington	1855	1858		Privately built and operated	
	Port Townsend/Port Angeles, Washington	1858	1893	Destroyed	Originally privately built and operated under contract; purchased by government in 1883; burned down	
	Port Townsend/Port Angeles, Washington	1862	1866	Destroyed	Relocated to Port Angeles; destroyed by flood and restored to Port Townsend	
	Port Townsend/Port Angeles, Washington	1896	1933	Demolished	Demolished in 1971	
	Seattle, Washington	1933	1981	Extant	Replaced Port Townsend hospital; transferred to City of Seattle and became Pacific Tower	
	San Francisco, California	1854	1868	Demolished	At Rincon Point; damaged by the 1868 Hayward earthquake and temporarily abandoned; later used as Sailor's Home and demolished in 1920s	
	San Francisco, California	1875	1932		On the Presidio of San Francisco	
	San Francisco, California	1932	1981	Extant	On the Presidio of San Francisco; reopened as apartments in 2010	
	Fort Stanton, New Mexico	1898	1953	Extant	Tuberculosis sanatorium; created from former Fort Stanton; NRHP-listed	
	Lahaina, Hawaii	1844	1862	Destroyed	Collapsed due to neglect in the 1970s, restored in 1982, interior destroyed in the 2023 Hawaii wildfires	
