= Environmental Health Divisions =

Unit of the U.S. Public Health Service (PHS)

The Environmental Health Divisions was a unit of the U.S. Public Health Service (PHS) that focused on environmental health, existing in various forms from 1913 until 1970. It is the primary direct predecessor of the U.S. Environmental Protection Agency. It had several other names earlier in its history, including the Office of Stream Pollution Investigations and Division of Sanitary Engineering Services.

PHS established a program focusing on water pollution in 1913 in Cincinnati. During and after World War II, it expanded into additional aspects of environmental health, becoming the Division of Sanitary Engineering Services in 1954. In 1960 it was reorganized into the Environmental Health Divisions, one of two units of the PHS Bureau of State Services. As part of a series of several reorganizations of PHS beginning in 1967, most of the former Environmental Health Divisions became the core of the newly formed Environmental Protection Agency in 1970, with the exception of two components that became the National Institute for Occupational Safety and Health and the FDA Center for Devices and Radiological Health. The direct successor of the PHS Environmental Health Divisions' main facility in Cincinnati, the Andrew W. Breidenbach Environmental Research Center, remains EPA's second-largest research and development facility.

== Origins ==
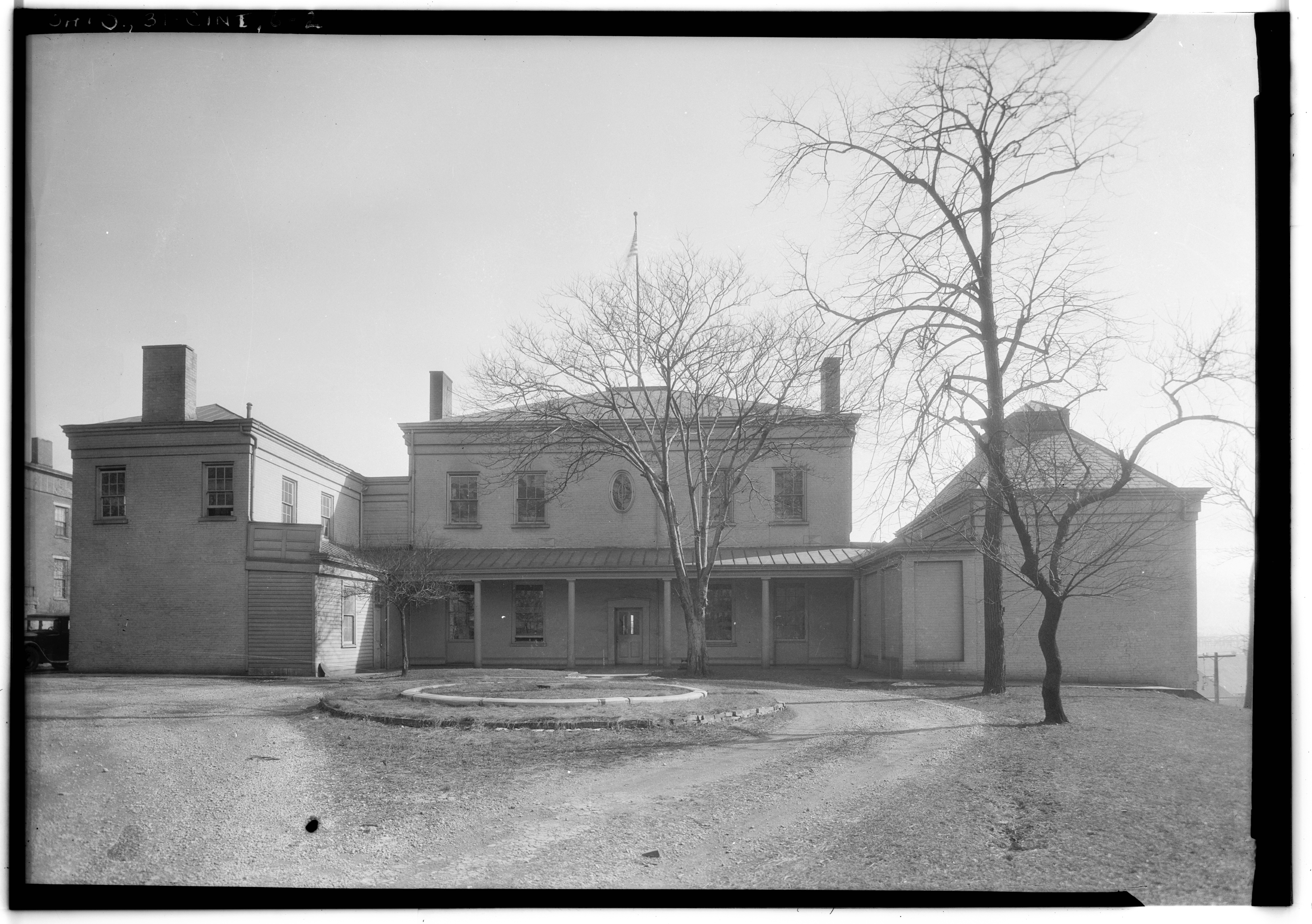
The former Cincinnati Marine Hospital, the converted Kilgour mansion, was the first home of the environmental health programs of PHS.

The 1912 PHS law (Pub. L. 62–265) expanded PHS's mission from communicable into non-communicable diseases. In 1913, the former Cincinnati U.S. Marine Hospital building was reopened as a Field Investigation Station for water pollution research. Its location in Cincinnati was due to the environmental effects of the industrial cities of the Ohio River on safe drinking water. Wade Hampton Frost was the first head of the program, which included four other commissioned medical officers and support staff, and five branch laboratories along the Ohio River.

It was initially called the Stream Pollution Investigations Station and focused on natural purification of streamwater, and water treatment systems. It later came to be known as the Office of Stream Pollution Investigations. It was initially part of the PHS Division of Scientific Research, and in 1942 it was part of its successor, the National Institute of Health.

== Expansion ==
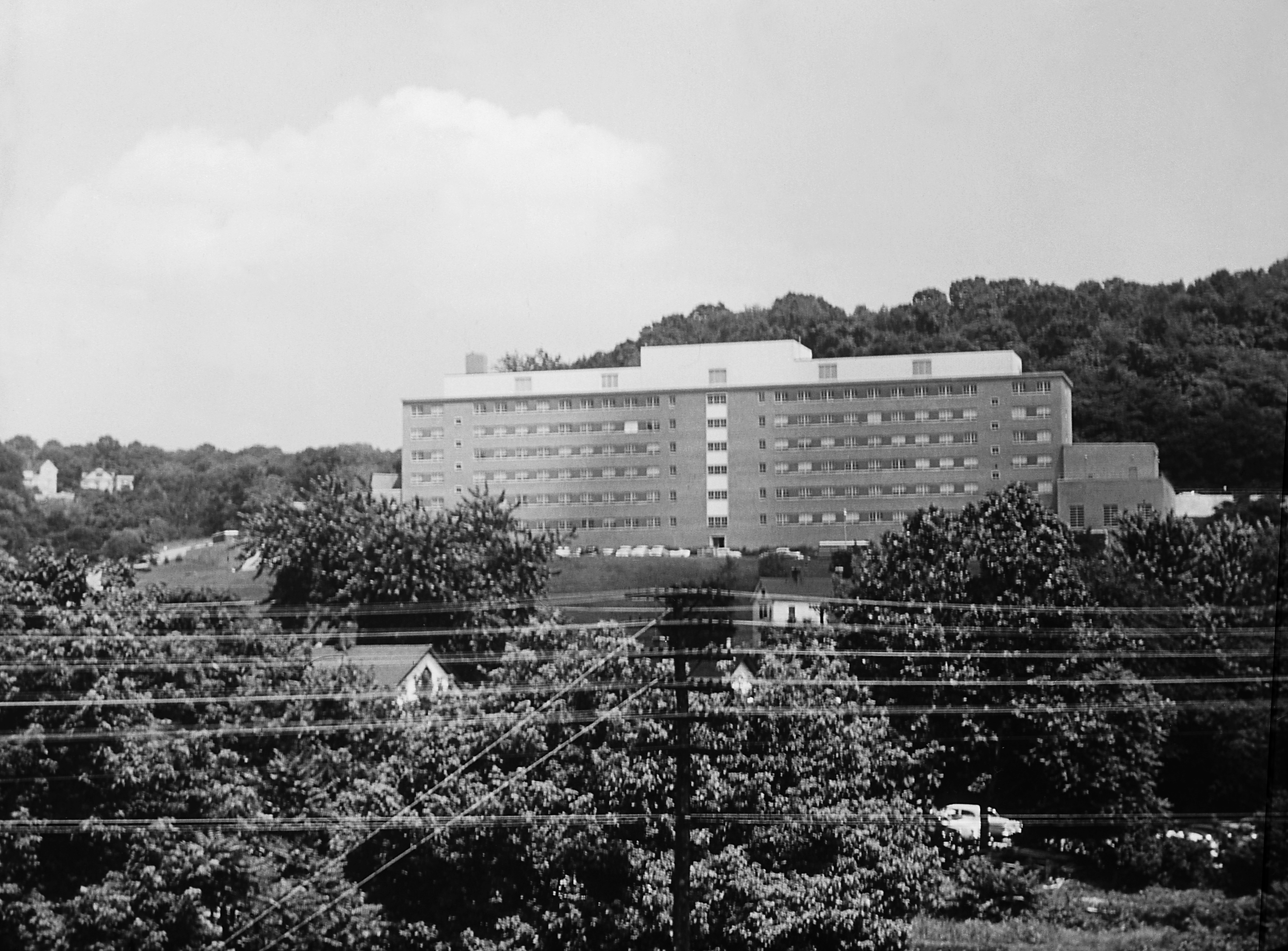
The environmental health laboratory moved to the new Robert A. Taft Center in 1954. This building would later be occupied by the National Institute for Occupational Safety and Health after the EPA vacated it in 1976.

During and after World War II, the facility expanded into air, industrial, and chemical pollution and radiological health research. In 1949 it was renamed the Environmental Health Center of the PHS to reflect its increased scope. It was given divisional status at that time. That year, the Division of Engineering Resources, Division of Sanitation, and Division of Water Pollution Control were also created as part of the initial setup of the Bureau of State Services.

In 1954, the four divisions were absorbed into the new Division of Sanitary Engineering Services as part of a realignment of the Bureau's programs into fewer, larger divisions. The same year, the environmental health programs moved from the former Marine Hospital to the newly constructed Robert A. Taft Sanitary Engineering Center, which consolidated seven PHS locations in Cincinnati. It was named for the recently deceased Senator Robert A. Taft, and had about 200 staff. Plans for the new building dated back as far as 1938, when the site was identified.

== Later history ==
During 1959–61, the Division of Sanitary Engineering Services was broken up into the Division of Environmental Engineering and Food Protection, Division of Air Pollution Control, and Division of Water Supply and Pollution Control. The Division of Radiological Health was also formed during this period. In 1960, the Environmental Health Divisions unit, one of two units of the Bureau of State Services, was created as an umbrella designation for these divisions. The Division of Occupational Health, which had different origins and operated at a different facility in Cincinnati, was also made part of the Environmental Health Divisions.

As of 1964, the center had grown to 1000 staff spread over ten locations in Cincinnati. At this time its programs included detection of radioactive fallout in the environment, study of the effects of pollution on food and milk, study of a massive fish kill on the lower Mississippi River, assisting air pollution control programs of the states, and studying water pollution from novel industrial chemicals.

In 1966, the Division of Water Supply and Pollution Control was transferred to the Department of the Interior, becoming the Federal Water Pollution Control Administration.

In 1967, in the first of a series of several reorganizations, the Environmental Health Divisions became the Bureau of Disease Prevention and Environmental Control. This bureau was short-lived, as in 1968, it was rolled into the new Consumer Protection and Environmental Health Service (CPEHS) within PHS and split into two operating agencies: the National Air Pollution Control Administration and the Environmental Control Administration. The Environmental Control Administration contained five bureaus: the Bureau of Solid Waste Management, Bureau of Water Hygiene, Bureau of Radiological Health, Bureau of Community Environmental Management, and Bureau of Occupational Safety and Health. Additionally, the Food and Drug Administration (FDA), which was previously not part of PHS, was moved into CPEHS.

Just prior to their incorporation into EPA, the Bureau of Water Hygiene had additional facilities in Narragansett, Rhode Island and Manchester, Washington; the Bureau of Radiation Health in Las Vegas and Montgomery, Alabama; and the National Air Pollution Control Administration in Ann Arbor, Michigan and at the Denver Federal Center in Lakewood, Colorado. The Federal Water Quality Administration had multiple facilities across the United States.

== Transformation into EPA ==
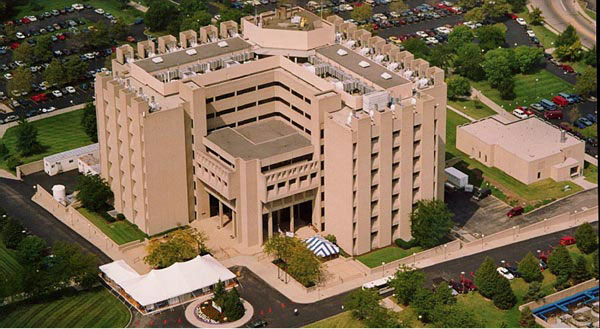
The EPA Andrew W. Breidenbach Environmental Research Center is the direct successor of the PHS Environmental Health Divisions' main facility in Cincinnati.

The Environmental Protection Agency was formed in 1970 largely from the former PHS Environmental Health Divisions, as it absorbed the entire National Air Pollution Control Administration; the Environmental Control Administration's Bureaus of Solid Waste Management, Water Hygiene, and part of Radiological Health; and the Federal Water Quality Administration, which had previously been transferred from PHS to the Department of the Interior in 1966. A few specific functions from other agencies mainly relating to pesticides and radiation were also incorporated into EPA.

On the other hand, PHS retained the Bureau of Occupational Safety and Health, which became the National Institute for Occupational Safety and Health; as well as the other part of the Bureau of Radiological Health, which moved into FDA and later became its Center for Devices and Radiological Health. The Bureau of Community Environmental Management was later absorbed by EPA and CDC in 1973.

Upon its creation, EPA inherited 84 sites spread across 26 states, of which 42 sites were laboratories. The EPA consolidated these laboratories into 22 sites. The EPA programs in the Taft Center moved to the new Andrew W. Breidenbach Environmental Research Center in Cincinnati in 1978, which as of 2021 remains EPA's second-largest research and development facility.
