= United States Marine Hospital (Cincinnati) =

United States Marine hospital

Two buildings in Cincinnati were known as the United States Marine Hospital. They were part of the U.S. Marine Hospital system, which was run by the Marine Hospital Service and its successor the Public Health Service, primarily for the benefit of the civilian merchant marine. The first was completed in 1860, but never used as a Marine Hospital as it was operated as a military hospital during the American Civil War, and was later sold to become Good Samaritan Hospital. The second was a former mansion that operated as a Marine Hospital during 1882–1905; it was later used as a water pollution field station that grew into the U.S. Public Health Service's primary environmental health research program, and the predecessor to the current Andrew W. Breidenbach Environmental Research Center.

== First hospital ==
U.S. Marine Hospital (Cincinnati)
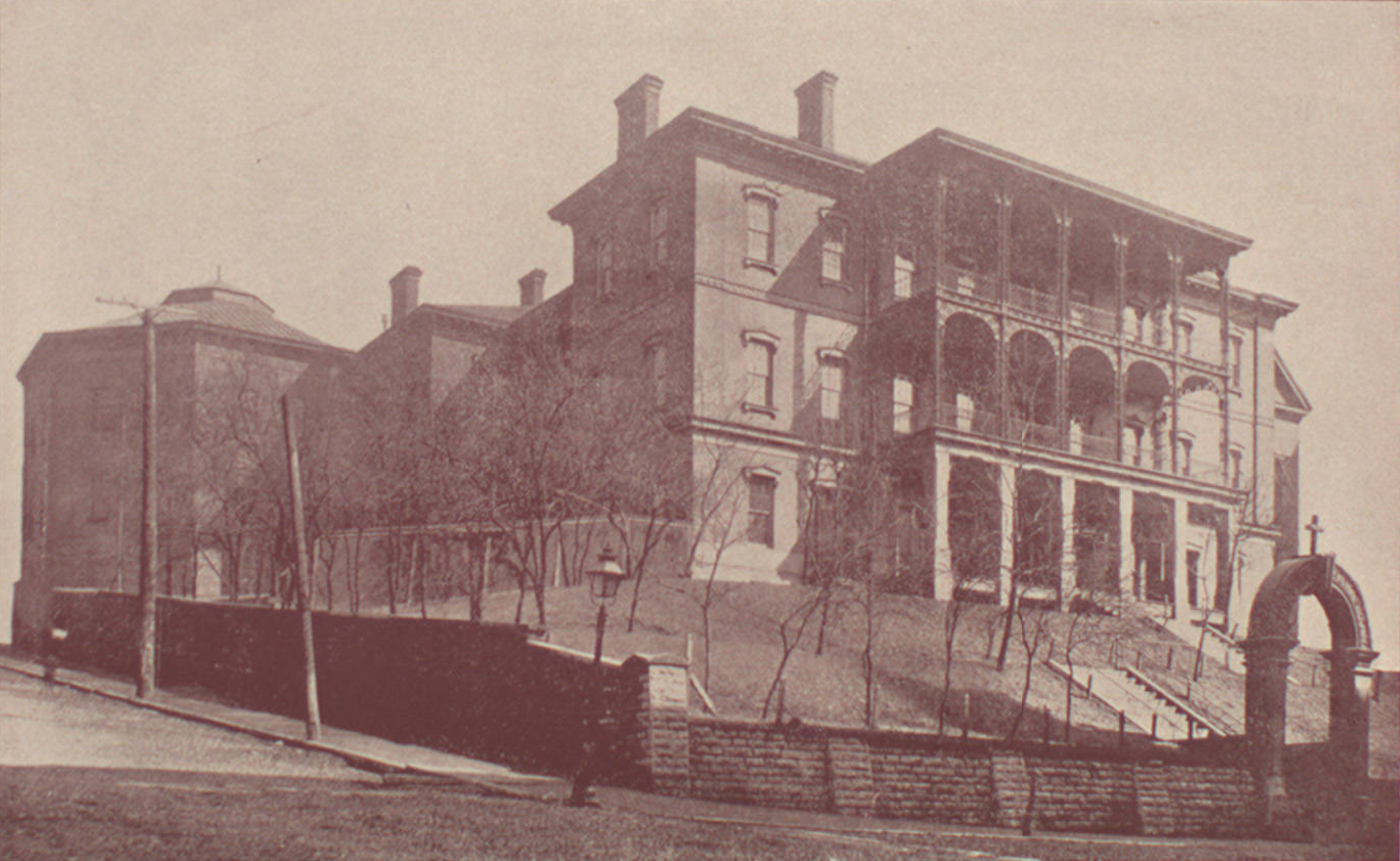
- The hospital in use as Good Samaritan Hospital around 1896

General information
- Coordinates: 39.1054°N 84.5031°W
- Completed: 1860
- Demolished: ca. 1970

The first hospital was completed in 1860 at Sixth and Lock Streets at the foot of Mount Adams to the east of Downtown. However, it was never used as a Marine Hospital because it was taken over by the Department of War at the beginning of the American Civil War as a military hospital for wounded soldiers. For its first few months, it operated through donations by local citizens.

After the war, it was purchased by banker Joseph C. Butler and donated to the Sisters of Charity, a Catholic religious community, to become the location of Good Samaritan Hospital. Butler had been impressed by the Sisters' charitable mission of providing free hospital care, and made the donation under the conditions that the hospital admit all requiring treatment if there was room, and not to discriminate by religion or nationality. They occupied the building from 1866 until 1915, when they moved to their current campus in the Clifton neighborhood.

The building was sold in 1924 to Henry C. Rocker to be converted to apartments. In 1946, it contained 38 apartments and 112 rooms. The building remained in use until it was condemned in 1970 and demolished for the construction of the Daniel Carter Beard Bridge and the adjoining interchange between Interstate 71 and Interstate 471.

== Second hospital ==
U.S. Marine Hospital (Cincinnati)
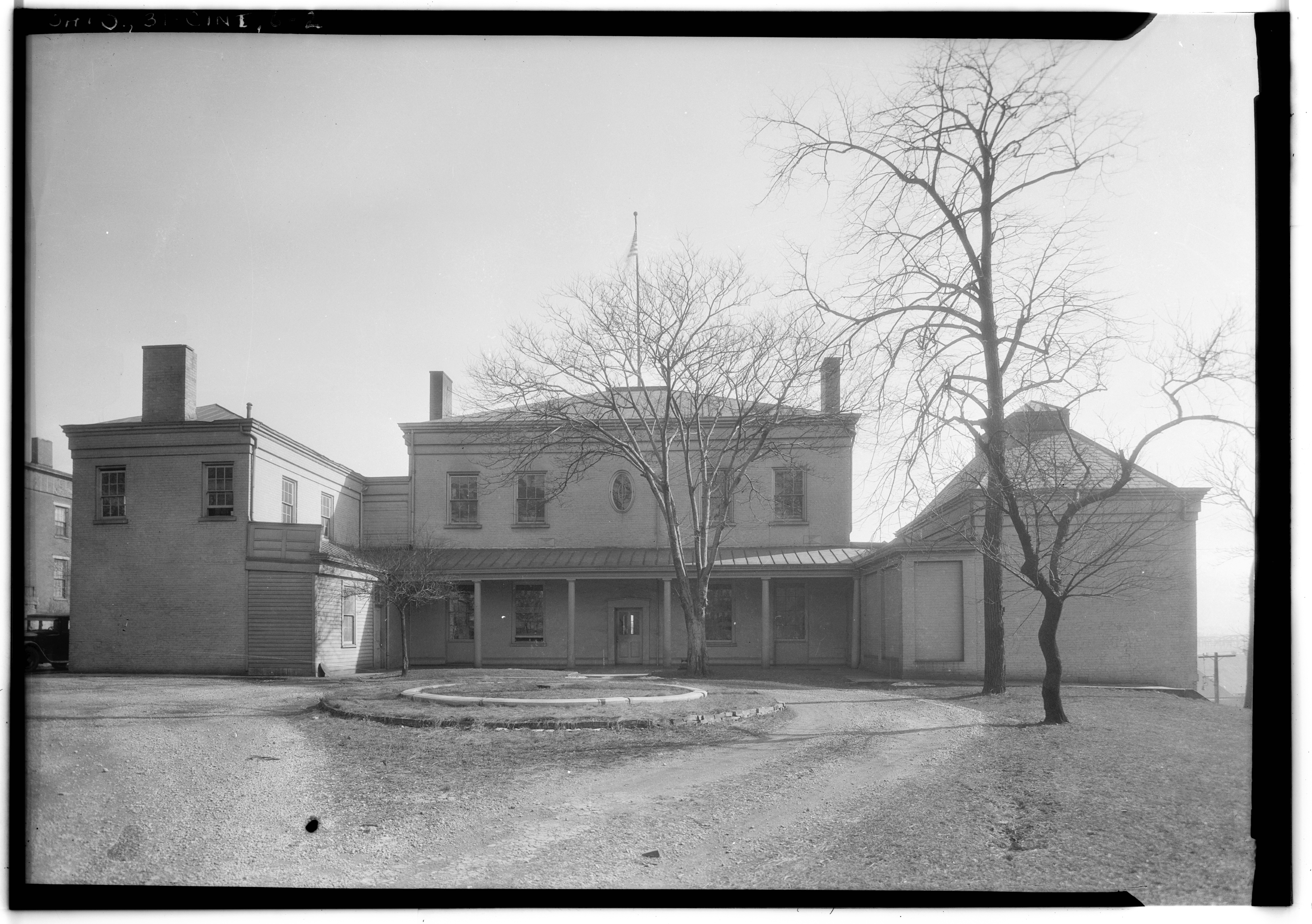
- The building in 1934

General information
- Coordinates: 39.1036°N 84.4980°W
- Completed: ca. 1815
- Demolished: ca. 1951

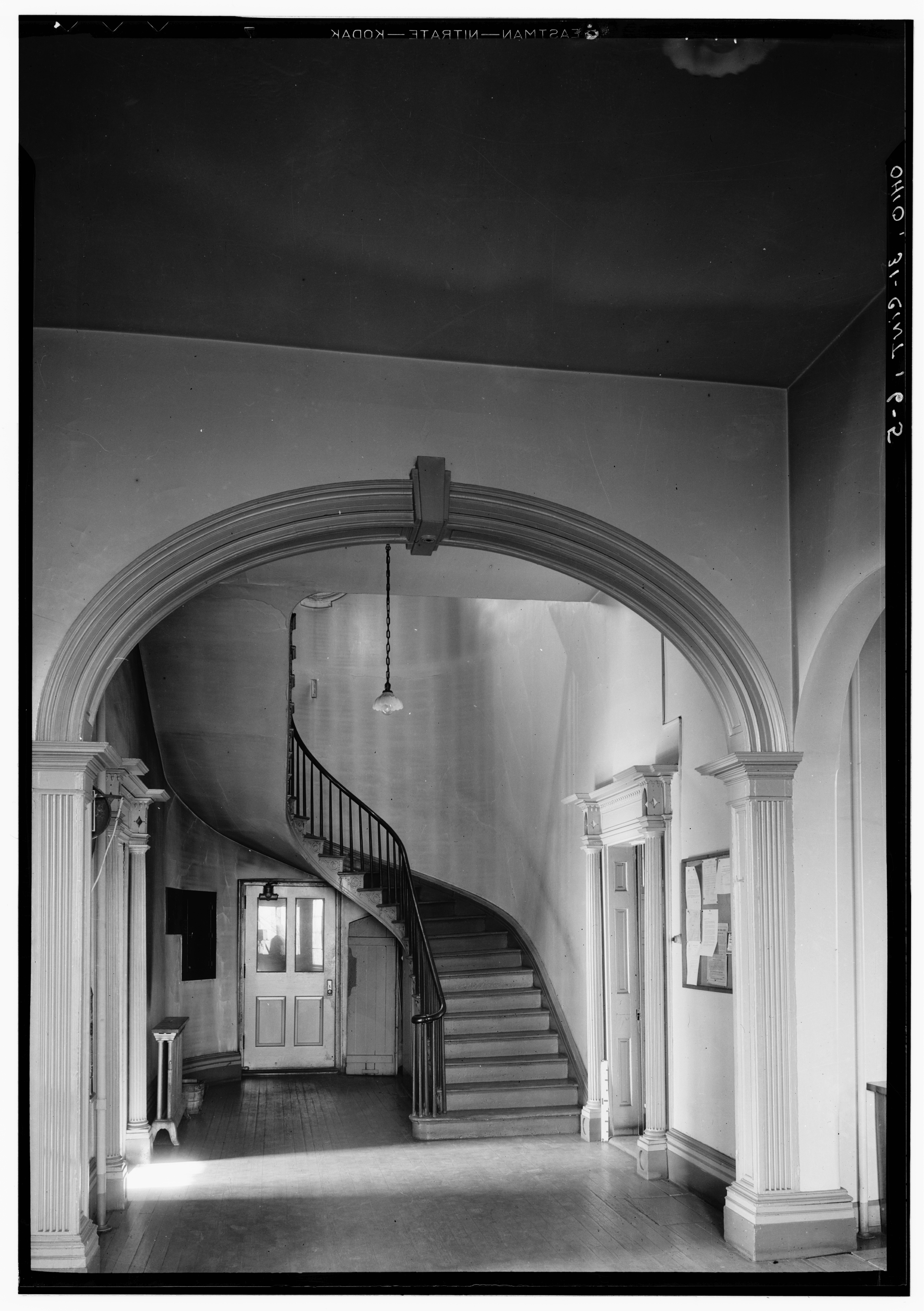
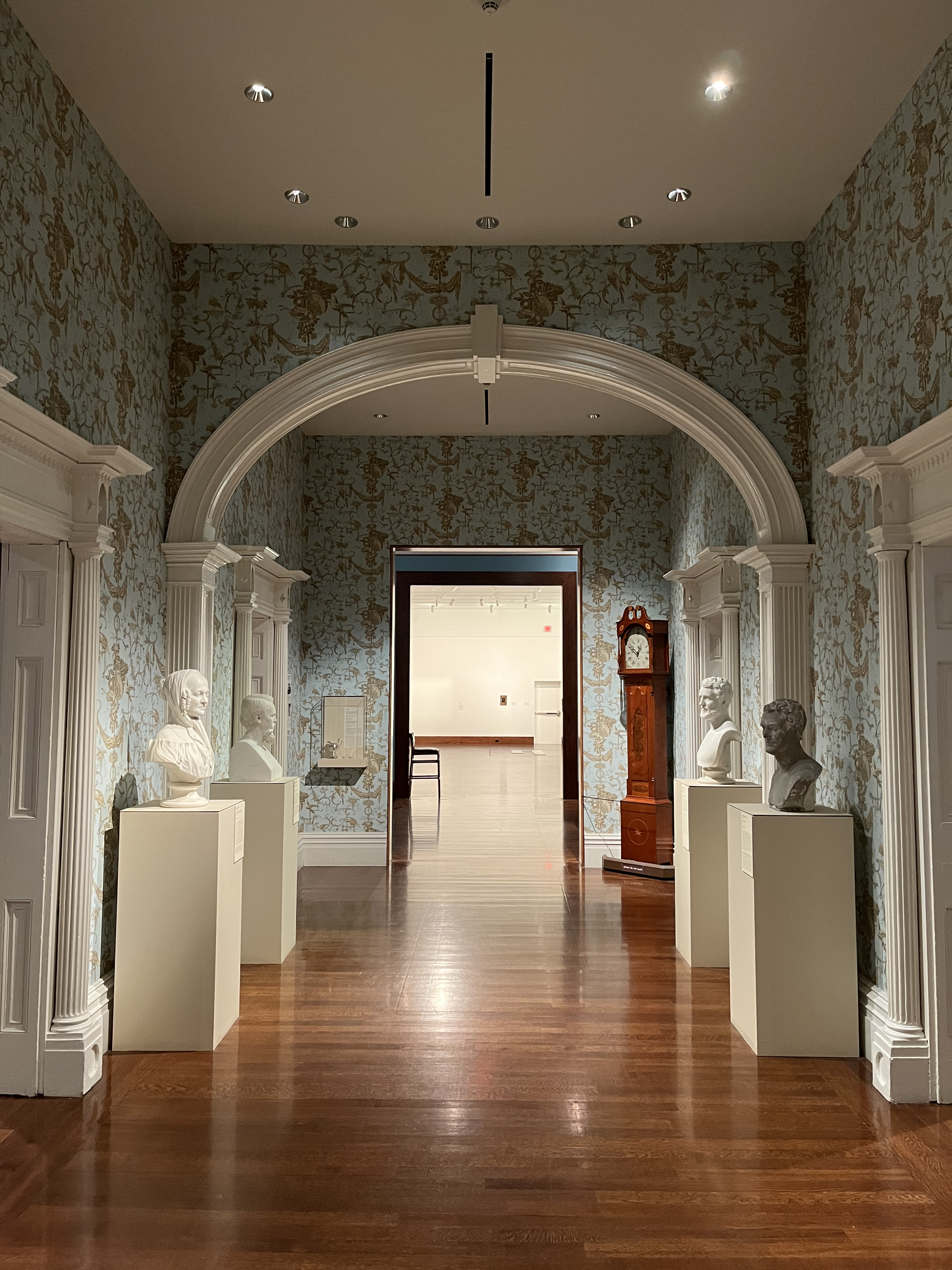
Some architectural elements from the Kilgour Mansion are preserved in the Cincinnati Art Museum

The second hospital was originally built around 1815 as the mansion of grocery and hardware merchant David Kilgour. It was a brick colonial structure with an ornate front porch with columns at the end of Third Street at the base of Mount Adams, and was known as the White House. It later passed to Charles H. Kilgour, a founder of Cincinnati Bell.

It was purchased by the government in 1882 and operated as a Marine Hospital. Two wings were constructed as hospital wards, with the original mansion used for administration. River traffic on the Ohio River decreased such that in 1905 only eight patients used the hospital, and it was closed that year.

In 1913, the building was reopened by the government as a Field Investigation Station for water pollution research. It grew into the Public Health Service's primary environmental health research center. The laboratory moved to the Robert A. Taft Laboratory in the Columbia-Tusculum neighborhood in 1954, and eventually became the Environmental Protection Agency's Andrew W. Breidenbach Environmental Research Center. Despite efforts to preserve it as a historical building, the mansion was demolished after the government moved out in 1951.
