= United States Immigration Station =

- U.S. National Register of Historic Places
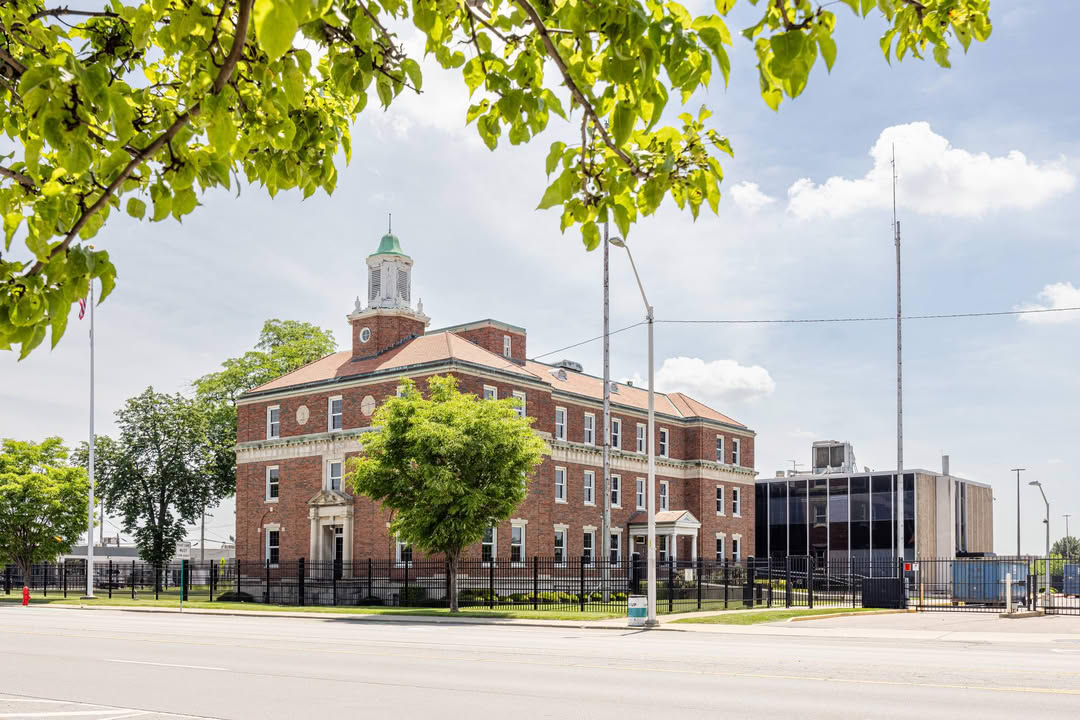
- Interactive map
- Location: 333 Mount Elliott Street; Detroit, Michigan
- Coordinates: 42°20′36″N 83°0′37″W
- Built: 1933
- Architect: James A. Wetmore
- Architectural style: Colonial Revival
- NRHP reference No.: 13000322
- Added to NRHP: May 22, 2013

The United States Immigration Station is a former government building located at 333 Mount Elliott Street in Detroit, Michigan. Until March 2024, it was known as the Rosa Parks Federal Building, and houses the Detroit Field Office of Immigration and Customs Enforcement. It was listed on the National Register of Historic Places in 2013.

== History ==
In 1853, a section of land on the corner of Mt Elliott and Jefferson Avenues in Detroit was set aside for the purpose of constructing a Marine Hospital. The original hospital was completed in 1857, and sited 225 feet off Jefferson. The hospital opened the same year, with Zina Pitcher as the first physician in charge. At some point, additional structures were built to support the hospital, including a building to house nurses on the corner of Mount Elliott and Jefferson.

In the early 1930s, the U.S. Bureau of Immigration and Customs and Border Protection took over the site of the Marine Hospital on Jefferson. The original buildings (now razed) were repurposed, and in 1933 this new office building was constructed. A modern addition was constructed in the rear of the building in 1964, at which time the main entrance was moved to face Mount Elliott.

The building was designated the "Rosa Parks Federal Building" in 2005, and in 2014 received extensive interior renovations and updates. However, the "Rosa Parks Federal Building" designation was removed in 2024 and applied to a larger building on Michigan Avenue in Detroit. Tenants moved to the Michigan Avenue building, and the Jefferson Avenue building was listed for auction on the GSA website for a $400,000 starting bid.

== Description ==
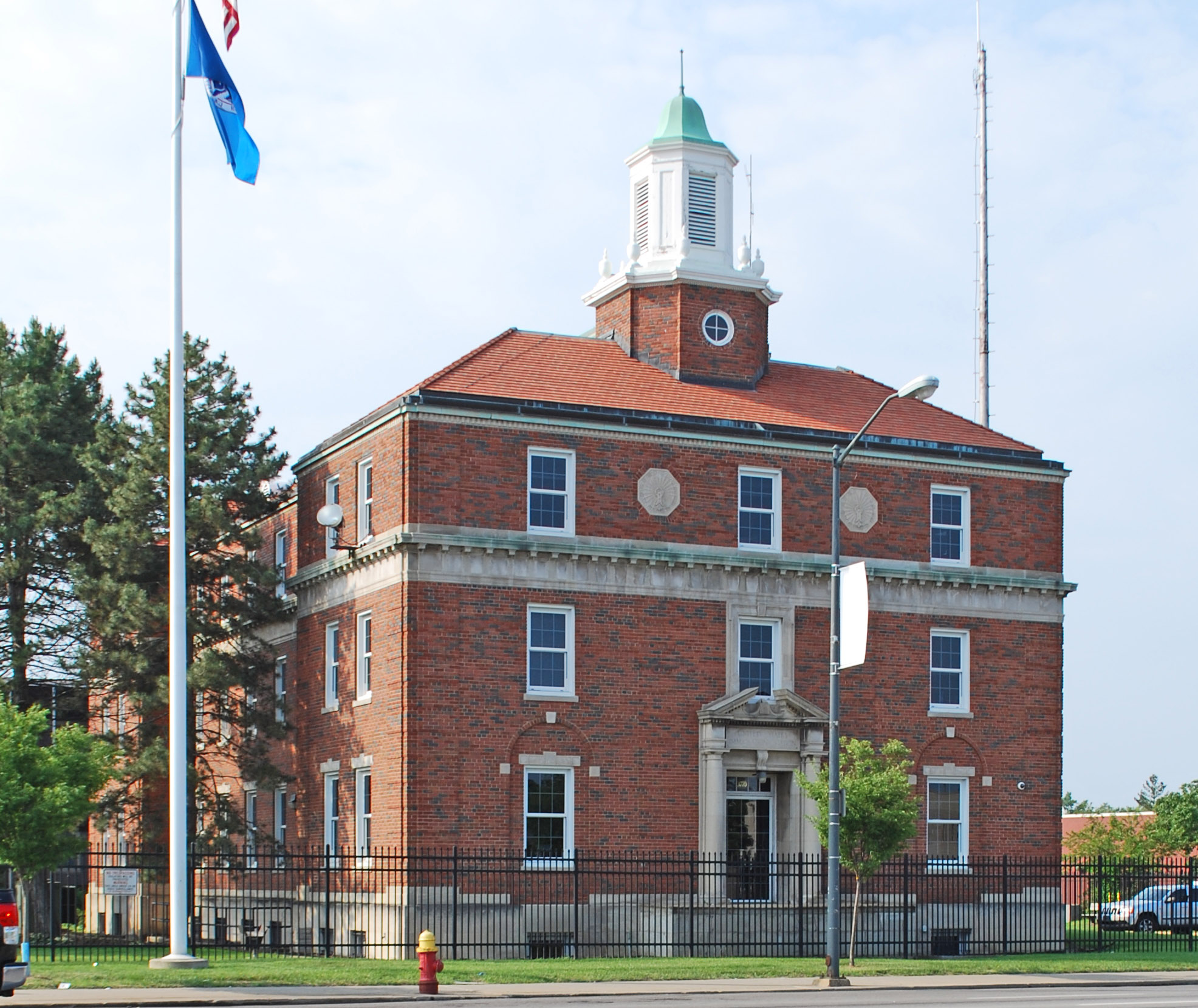
North face of the building in 2013

This building is a three story Colonial Revival structure built of brick with limestone trim. It has a hipped roof covered with red clay tiles and topped with a prominent cupola. The foundation is built of limestone block, forming a water table; the walls above are brick. The corners feature raised brickwork simulating quoining. The primary facade on the north contains the original entryway. The facade is symmetric, with three window bays and a center entrance. Surrounding this entrance surrounds are carved limestone features, including a pair of Ionic columns and a wide frieze with the words "United States Immigration Station." The entryway opens onto a raised limestone block porch, but the steps were removed during the 1964 renovation.

== See also ==
- United States Immigration Station, Angel Island.
