= Stony Run (Baltimore) =

Tributary stream of Jones Falls

Coordinates: 39.31683°N 76.62672°W

Stony Run in 1973.

Stony Run is a tributary stream of Jones Falls in Baltimore, Maryland. Its headwaters are in north Baltimore near the city boundary. The stream flows southward about 3 miles (4.8 km) past Gilman School, Cathedral of Mary Our Queen, and Friends School of Baltimore following the former Ma and Pa Railroad route, and through Wyman Park. It enters a culvert before emptying into Jones Falls near Druid Hill Park.
