= Wyman Park, Baltimore =

Neighborhood in Baltimore, Maryland, United States

Coordinates: 39°19′51″N 76°37′39″W

Wyman Park (Neighborhood)
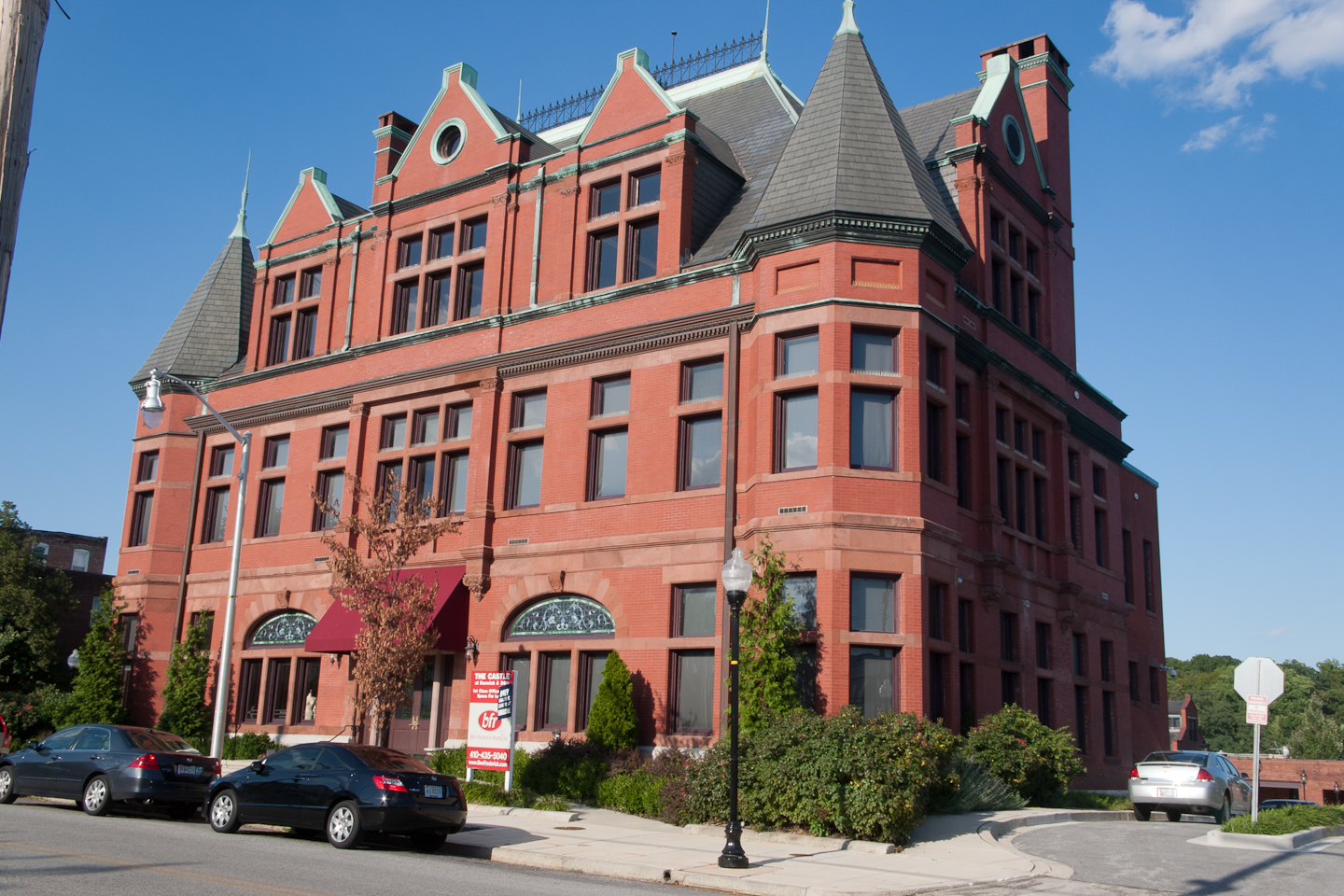
- Northern District Police Station, August 2011
- Interactive map of Wyman Park (Neighborhood)
- Type: Neighborhood
- Location: Baltimore, Maryland
- Area: 70.6 acres (28.6 ha)

The community of Wyman Park is a border community that links Hampden to Roland Park. All of the Wyman Park areas were annexed to Baltimore City in 1888. The general boundaries consist of the area from south to north between 33rd Street and 40th Streets and west to east from Keswick Road to Wyman Park, which includes the southern portion of the Stony Run Trail. South of 40th Street, garden apartments, multi-story apartment buildings, and single-family residences have been built. People here tend to relate to the north along 40th Street and University Parkway and Johns Hopkins University.

== History ==
Throughout the eighteenth and nineteenth centuries, this land remained attached to large rural estates, and the only settlement of note occurred in the adjacent Stony Run valley. Here, along the stream's west bank, two flour mills once operated. It is believed that one mill, Ensor's, was located opposite 36th Street.

In the 1870s, the Swan Lake Narrow Gauge Railroad (later called the Baltimore and Lehigh Railroad, and in 1901, the Maryland and Pennsylvania Railroad) was built along Stony Run. In the last quarter of the nineteenth century, a popular tavern, known as Biddy Rice's Saloon, operated along the tracks opposite Bottle Hill, upon which sits the present-day Tudor Arms Apartments.

Most construction took place in the 1920s and continued into the 1960s with several small garden apartments. In addition, Keswick Nursing Home north of 40th Street has expanded, while next door Roland Park Place has replaced the Roland Park Country School. To the east Johns Hopkins University has slowly expanded into Wyman Park, and some of the open space has disappeared.

Wyman Park is home of the Northern District Police Station, which is listed on the National Register of Historic Places.

== See also ==
- List of Baltimore neighborhoods
- Wyman Park Building
