= Andrew W. Breidenbach Environmental Research Center =

Coordinates: 39.136472°N 84.510917°W

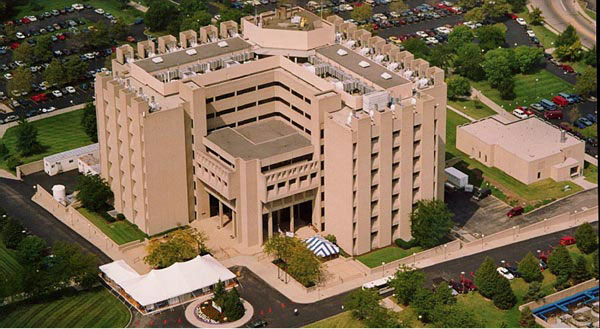
Andrew W. Breidenbach Environmental Research Center

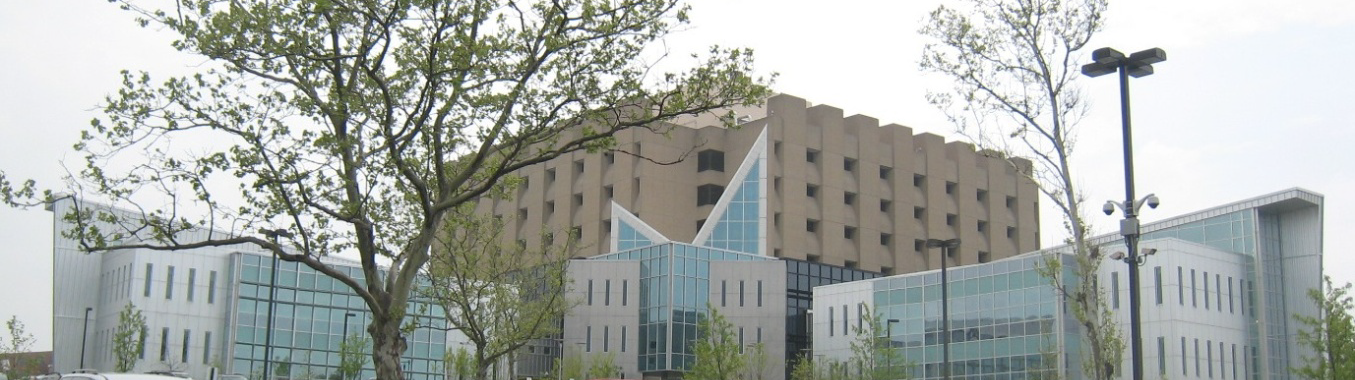
Rear of the building, showing Annex 1 and Annex 2

The Andrew W. Breidenbach Environmental Research Center in Cincinnati is the second-largest research and development facility of the United States Environmental Protection Agency. It specializes in water research, bioremediation, and pollution prevention.

== History ==
=== Background ===
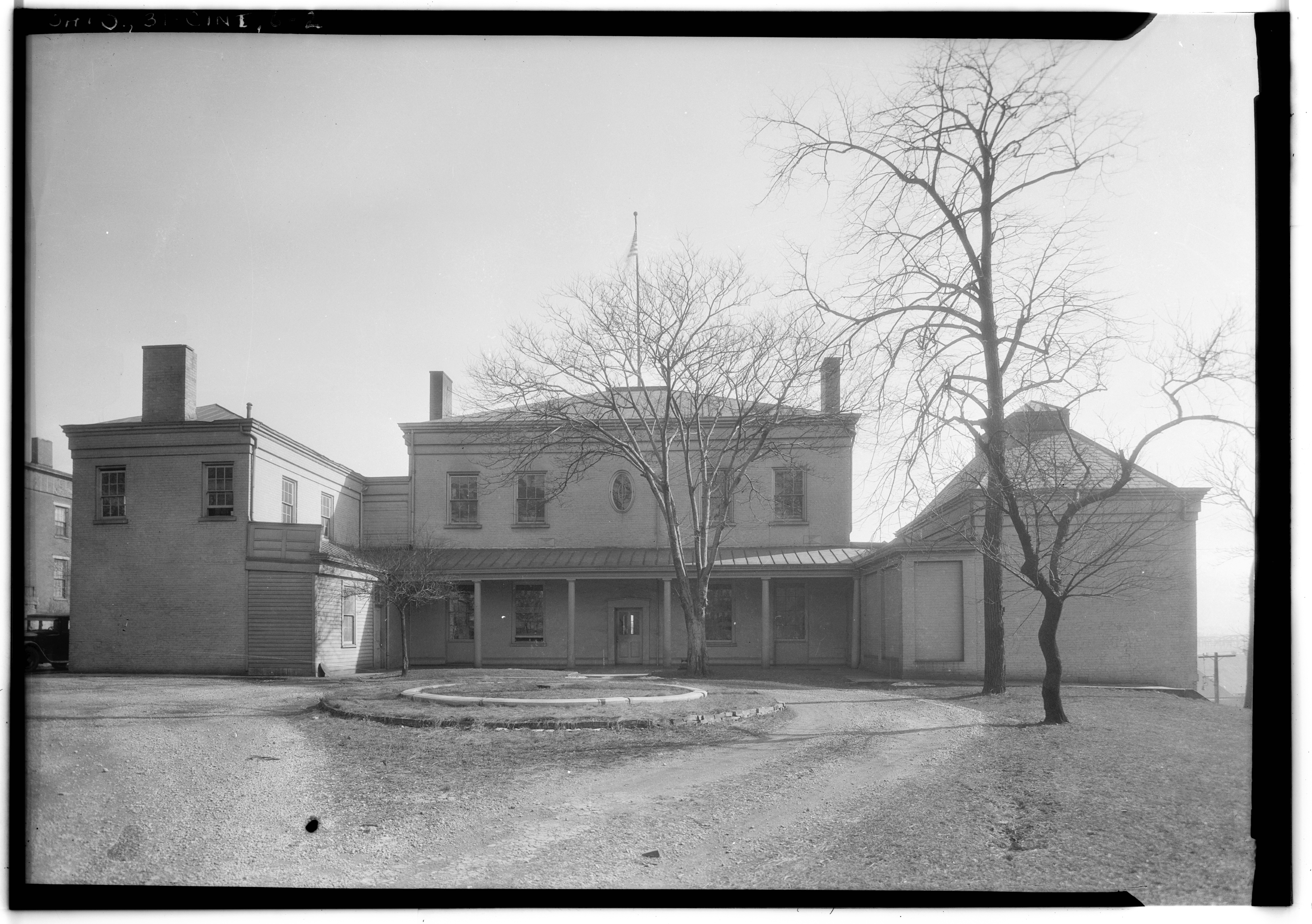
The former Cincinnati Marine Hospital, a converted mansion, was the first home of the environmental health laboratory that would become the Breidenbach Center.

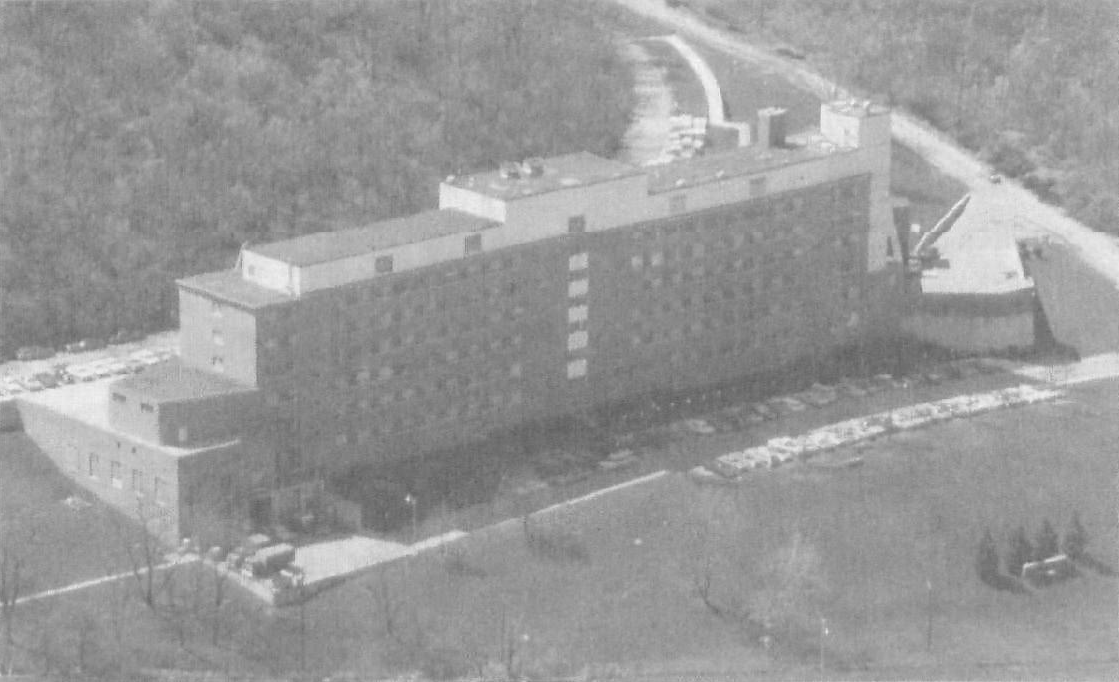
The environmental health laboratory moved to the new Robert A. Taft Center in 1954. This building would later be occupied by the National Institute for Occupational Safety and Health after the EPA vacated it in 1976.

The Environmental Research Center traces its lineage to activities of the U.S. Public Health Service (PHS) in Cincinnati since the 1850s. A U.S. Marine Hospital was established in Cincinnati in 1882 in the former Kilgour Mansion, built around 1815 by David Kilgour. The hospital closed in 1905, but the 1912 PHS law (Pub. L. 62–265) led to the building being reopened as a Field Investigation Station for water pollution research. It was initially called the Stream Pollution Investigations Station and focused on natural purification of streamwater, and water treatment systems. 1949 it was renamed the Environmental Health Center of the PHS as it expanded into air, industrial, and chemical pollution and radiological health research.

In 1954 it moved to the newly constructed Robert A. Taft Sanitary Engineering Center, which consolidated seven PHS locations. It was named for the recently deceased Senator Robert A. Taft, and had about 200 staff. As of 1964, the center had grown to 1000 staff spread over ten locations in Cincinnati. A separate PHS Division of Occupational Health also existed that was not part of the center.

In 1966 the center was transferred to the Federal Water Quality Administration in the Department of the Interior, and in 1970 to the newly created Environmental Protection Agency (EPA).

=== Current building ===
Upon its creation, EPA inherited 84 sites spread across 26 states, of which 42 sites were laboratories. The EPA consolidated these laboratories into 22 sites, with major research centers in Cincinnati, Research Triangle Park, Las Vegas, and Corvallis, Oregon. The new Andrew W. Breidenbach Environmental Research Center, a 10-story building on a 22-acre site, opened in 1978. It was named after Andrew W. Breidenbach, the recently retired EPA Assistant Administrator for Water and Hazardous Materials. The EPA vacated the Taft Center, which was taken over by the National Institute for Occupational Safety and Health.

A free-standing one-story full containment laboratory was constructed after 1987. At the time, there was no known full containment facility for the desired research on highly hazardous materials in the United States. A Child Development Center was constructed in the 1980s. Annex 1, a three-story addition containing office space, opened in 2004. Annex 2, which was built to LEED Gold standards, consists of a north wing opened in 2007, and a west wing opened in 2008. As of 2013, 894 employees worked at the complex.

In 2017, EPA employed 980 people at the center, of which 537 were federal employees. As of 2025, satellite facilities existed in the Lower Price Hill and Winton Hills neighborhoods of Cincinnati, as well as in its suburbs Milford, Blue Ash, and Erlanger, Kentucky. As part of an announced 2025 reorganization of EPA, the center was planned to move from the Office of Research and Development to a new Office of Applied Science and Environmental Solutions.
