= United States Public Health Service =

Division of the U.S. Department of Health and Human Services which manages public health

- Logo of the United States; Public Health Service

- Flag of the U.S. Public Health Service

Agency overview
- Formed: 1798; 228 years ago (reorganized/renamed: 1871/1902/1912)
- Jurisdiction: Federal government of the United States
- Headquarters: Hubert H. Humphrey Building Washington, D.C., U.S.
- Agency executive: Admiral Brian Christine, MD, Assistant Secretary for Health
- Parent agency: Department of Health and Human Services
- Website: https://www.hhs.gov/ash
- "Public Health Service March"

The United States Public Health Service (USPHS or PHS) is a collection of agencies of the United States Department of Health and Human Services which manages public health, containing nine out of the department's twelve operating divisions. The assistant secretary for health oversees the PHS. The United States Public Health Service Commissioned Corps (PHSCC) is the federal uniformed service of the PHS, and is one of the eight uniformed services of the United States.

PHS had its origins in the system of marine hospitals that originated in 1798. In 1871, these were consolidated into the Marine Hospital Service, and shortly afterwards the position of Surgeon General and the PHSCC were established. As the system's scope grew to include quarantine authority and research, it was renamed the Public Health Service in 1912.

A series of reorganizations in 1966–1973 began a shift where PHS' divisions were promoted into departmental operating agencies. PHS was established as a thin layer of hierarchy above them rather than an operating agency in its own right.

In 1995, PHS agencies were shifted to report directly to the secretary of health and human services rather the assistant secretary for health, eliminating PHS as an administrative level in the organizational hierarchy.

== Organization ==
Ten of the thirteen operating agencies within the Department of Health and Human Services (HHS) are designated as part of the Public Health Service:

- National Institutes of Health
- Food and Drug Administration
- Centers for Disease Control and Prevention
- Health Resources and Services Administration
- Agency for Toxic Substances and Disease Registry
- Indian Health Service
- Agency for Healthcare Research and Quality
- Substance Abuse and Mental Health Services Administration
- Administration for Strategic Preparedness and Response
- Advanced Research Projects Agency for Health

The other three agencies are the Centers for Medicare and Medicaid Services, Administration for Children and Families, and Administration for Community Living.

The Public Health Service also encompasses two staff offices:

- Office of the Assistant Secretary for Health
- Office of Global Affairs

=== United States Public Health Service Commissioned Corps ===
The United States Public Health Service Commissioned Corps (PHSCC) employs more than 6,000 uniformed public health professionals for the purpose of delivering public health promotion and disease prevention programs, and advancing public health science.

The mission of the U.S. Public Health Service Commissioned Corps is to protect, promote, and advance the health and safety of the people of the United States. According to the PHSCC, this mission is achieved through rapid and effective response to public health needs, leadership and excellence in public health practices, and advancement of public health science.

As one of the United States eight uniformed services, the PHS Commissioned Corps fills public health leadership and service roles within federal government agencies and programs. The PHSCC includes officers drawn from many professions, including environmental and occupational health, medicine, nursing, dentistry, pharmacy, psychology, social work, hospital administration, health record administration, nutrition, engineering, science, veterinary, health information technology, and other health-related occupations.

Officers of the Corps wear uniforms similar to those of the United States Navy with special PHSCC insignia, and the Corps uses the same commissioned officer ranks as the U.S. Navy, the U.S. Coast Guard, and the NOAA Commissioned Officer Corps from ensign to admiral, uniformed services pay grades O-1 through O-10 respectively.

According to 5 U.S.C. § 8331, service in the PHSCC after June 30, 1960, is considered military service for retirement purposes. Under 42 U.S.C. § 213, active service in the PHSCC is considered active military service for the purposes of most veterans' benefits and for antidiscrimination laws.

The PHSCC is considered "military" under United States Code here:

- Under 5 U.S.C. § 8331, PHSCC after June 30, 1960, is considered military service for retirement purposes.
- Under 10 U.S.C. § 101(a)(5), the PHSCC is defined as a uniformed service; by regulation (CCIs/Navy customs), officers render military salutes & courtesies.
- Under 26 U.S. Code § 414(u)(5), the PHSCC is considered qualified military service for Internal Revenue purposes.
- Under 29 CFR § 825.102, the PHSCC is considered military for caregiver purposes.
- Under 32 CFR § 1630.12 Class 1-C, the PHSCC is considered military for selective service registration purposes.
- Under 32 CFR § 1630.40 - Class 4-A, the PHSCC is considered military for selective service fulfillment purposes.
- Under 34 CFR § 685.219, the PHSCC is considered military for Public Service Loan Forgiveness purposes.
- Under 37 U.S. Code § 205 , the PHSCC is considered military for pay purposes.
- Under 38 CFR § 3.6, PHSCC is considered military for VA disability purposes.
- Under 38 CFR § 3.750, PHSCC is considered military for computing entitlement to concurrent receipt of military retired pay and disability compensation.
- Under 38CFR501(a) Sec. 3.7, PHSCC is considered military for computing Pension, Compensation, and Dependency and Indemnity Compensation.
- Under 38 U.S.C. 501(a) Sec. 3.750 (a) PHSCC is considered military for defining retired pay.
- Under 42 U.S.C. § 213, PHSCC is considered active military service for the veterans' benefits and for antidiscrimination laws.
- Under 42 U.S.C. §§ 213d & 216 PHSCC is authorized to wear uniforms that have been and are currently styled after military uniforms of other services. When detailed, PHSCC Officers wear the gaining service's uniform with USPHS identification (e.g., Coast Guard ODU; DoD field uniform such as OCP/legacy BDU/DCU) in accordance with CCIs and inter-service agreements.
- Under 50 U.S.C. App. §§501-597b, PHSCC is considered active military under the Servicemembers Civil Relief Act.

== History ==
Modern public health began developing in the 19th century, as a response to advances in science that led to the understanding of the source and spread of disease. As the knowledge of contagious diseases increased, means to control them and prevent infection were soon developed. Once it became understood that these strategies would require community-wide participation, disease control began being viewed as a public responsibility. Various organizations and agencies were then created to implement these disease preventing strategies. As the U.S. expanded, the scope of the governmental health agency expanded. Most of the Public health activity in the United States took place at the municipal level before the mid-20th century. There was some activity at the national and state level as well.

=== Marine Hospital Service ===
In the administration of the second president of the United States John Adams, Congress authorized the creation of hospitals for mariners through the 1798 Act for the Relief of Sick and Disabled Seamen. They were initially located along the East Coast, and as the boundaries of the United States expanded, so too were marine hospitals. The Marine Hospital Service was placed under the Revenue Marine Service (a forerunner of the present-day Coast Guard) within the Department of the Treasury.

A reorganization in 1871 converted the loose network of locally controlled marine hospitals into a centrally controlled Marine Hospital Service, with its headquarters in Washington, D.C. This reorganization established the Marine Hospital Service as its own bureau within the Department of the Treasury. The position of Supervising Surgeon (later titled the Surgeon General) was created to administer the Service, and John Maynard Woodworth was appointed as the first incumbent in 1871. He moved quickly to reform the system and adopted a military model for his medical staff; putting his physicians in uniforms, and instituting examinations for applicants. Woodworth created a cadre of mobile, career service physicians, who could be assigned as needed to the various Marine Hospitals. The commissioned officer corps was formally established by legislation after the fact in 1889, and signed by President Grover Cleveland.

The scope of activities of the Marine Hospital Service began to expand well beyond the care of merchant seamen in the closing decades of the nineteenth century, into control of infectious disease, collection of health statistics, and basic science research. Following cholera epidemics in the US in 1873, the National Quarantine Act of 1878 vested quarantine authority to the Marine Hospital Service. Under the Public Health Act of 1879, this authority was temporarily shared with the U.S. Army and Navy through the National Board of Health, until 1883.

Given the prevalence of infectious disease among immigrants arriving from famine and war areas of Europe, the Marine Hospital Service was assigned to medically inspect immigrants at such sites as Ellis Island in New York Harbor. In 1878, an act of Congress enabled the Marine Hospital Service to collect data on communicable diseases and perform surveillance of the incidence and distribution of diseases; these programs would eventually become the National Center for Health Statistics. In 1887, the Hygienic Laboratory, the predecessor of the National Institutes of Health, began as a single-room laboratory for bacteriological investigation at the Staten Island Marine Hospital, and moved to Washington, D.C. in 1891.

In 1899, internal divisions were formed for the first time, specifically the Divisions of Marine Hospitals, Domestic Quarantine, Foreign Quarantine, Sanitary Reports and Statistics, Scientific Research, and Personnel and Accounts. These original divisions would remain through 1943, although there were minor name changes throughout this time, and a few new divisions would be created.

=== Development as the Public Health Service ===
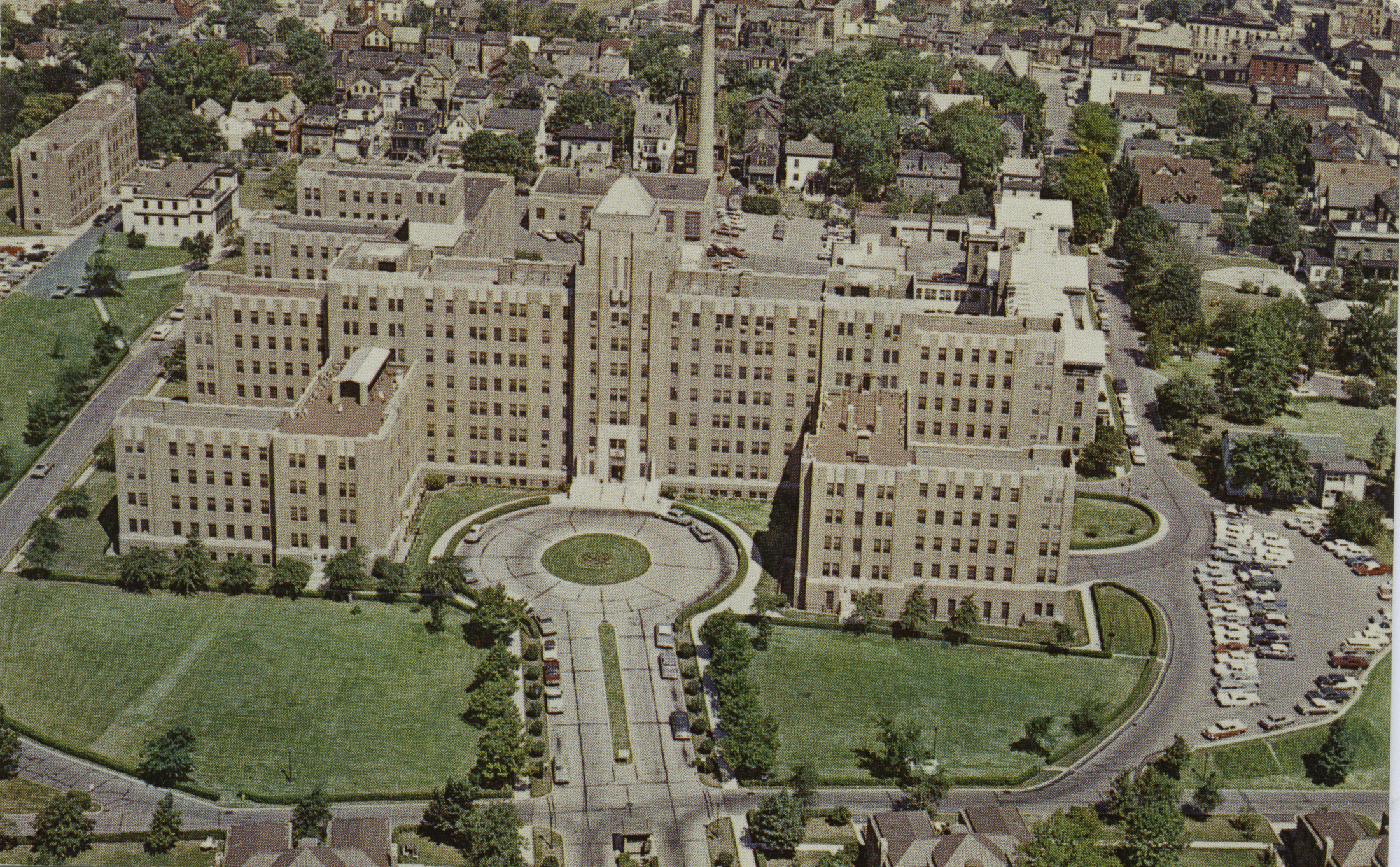
The Staten Island PHS Hospital is an example of the large hospital buildings constructed by PHS in the early 20th century. It was built adjacent to the smaller 19th-century hospital.

Because the Service took on broader responsibilities, in 1902 it was renamed as the Public Health and Marine Hospital Service. In 1912, under new authorizing legislation, it was established as the Public Health Service (PHS) to express the enlarged scope of its work.

The 1912 PHS law (Pub. L. 62–265) expanded the agency's mission from communicable to include non-communicable diseases. In 1913, the former Cincinnati Marine Hospital building was reopened as a Field Investigation Station for water pollution research. This was the beginning of the PHS Environmental Health Divisions, a precursor to the Environmental Protection Agency.

In 1914, the Office of Industrial Hygiene and Sanitation, the direct predecessor of the National Institute for Occupational Safety and Health, was founded at the Pittsburgh Marine Hospital. Both of these offices were within the Division of Scientific Research.

The Division of Venereal Diseases was established in 1918, and the Narcotics Division in 1929 (it eventually became the National Institute of Mental Health). One of the Division of Venereal Diseases' first employees was Dr. Roscoe Brown, an African American dentist and health activist. In 1932 after years of persistence from the African American community, Dr. Brown became the first chairman of the Office of Negro Health Work. In 1930, the Hygienic Laboratory was redesignated as the (singular) National Institute of Health (NIH) by the Ransdell Act; in 1937, it absorbed the rest of the Division of Scientific Research, of which it was formerly part, and in 1938 it moved to its current campus in Bethesda, Maryland. In 1939, PHS as a whole was transferred from the Department of the Treasury into the new Federal Security Agency. In 1942, the Office of Malaria Control in War Areas was created, which in 1946 became the Communicable Disease Center, which would eventually become the Centers for Disease Control and Prevention.

Beginning in the late 1920s and continuing through the New Deal era, a significant building campaign upgraded several marine hospitals into large, monumental buildings, in contrast with the smaller buildings common for the 19th-century buildings. PHS's headquarters were in the Butler Building, a converted mansion across the street from the United States Capitol, from 1891 until April 1929. It expanded into office space in Temporary Building C on the National Mall in July 1920, which became its temporary headquarters after the Butler Building was closed for demolition. In May 1933, the new Public Health Service Building opened on the National Mall.

=== Mid-20th century ===
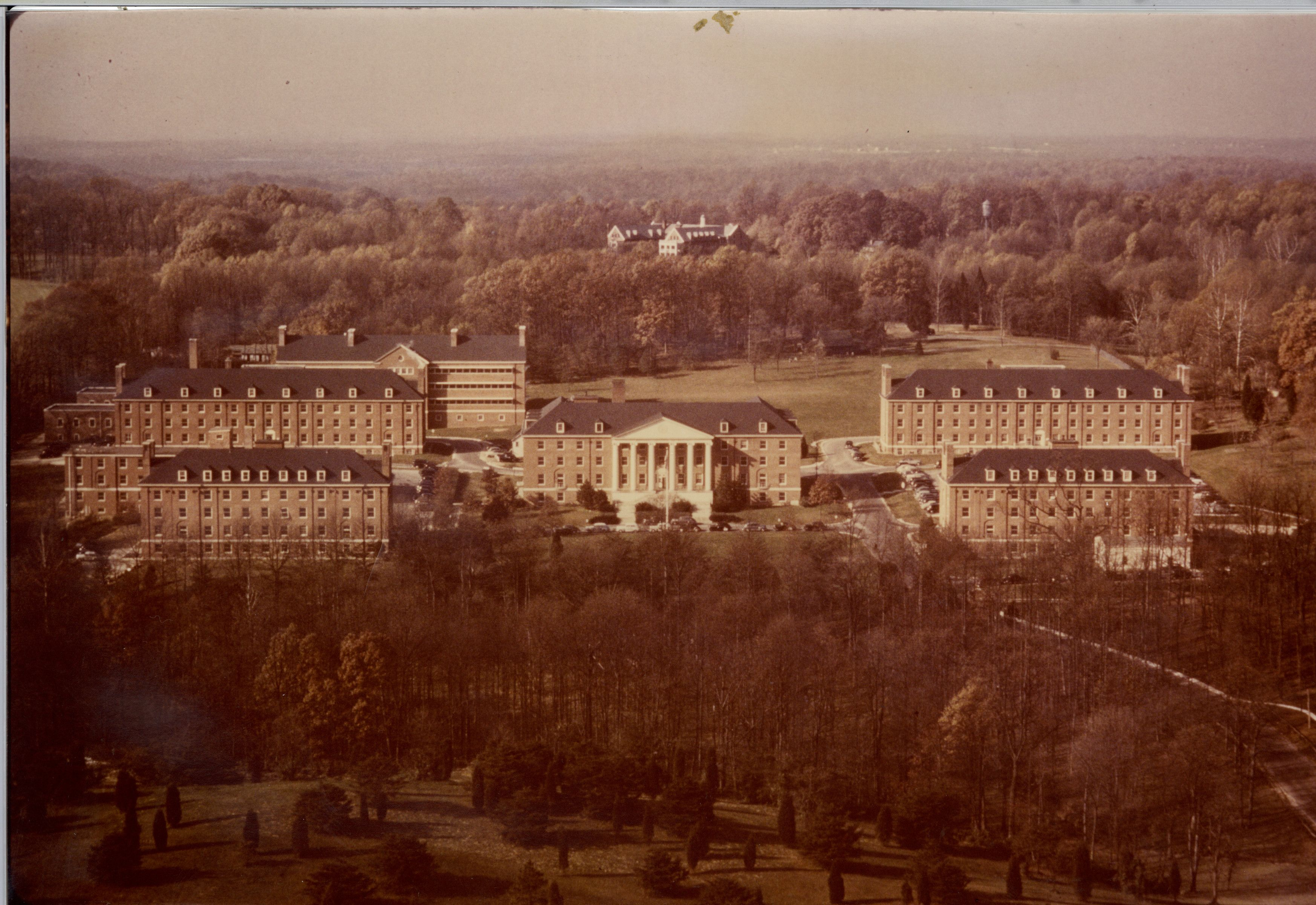
The National Institutes of Health campus in Bethesda, Maryland in 1949

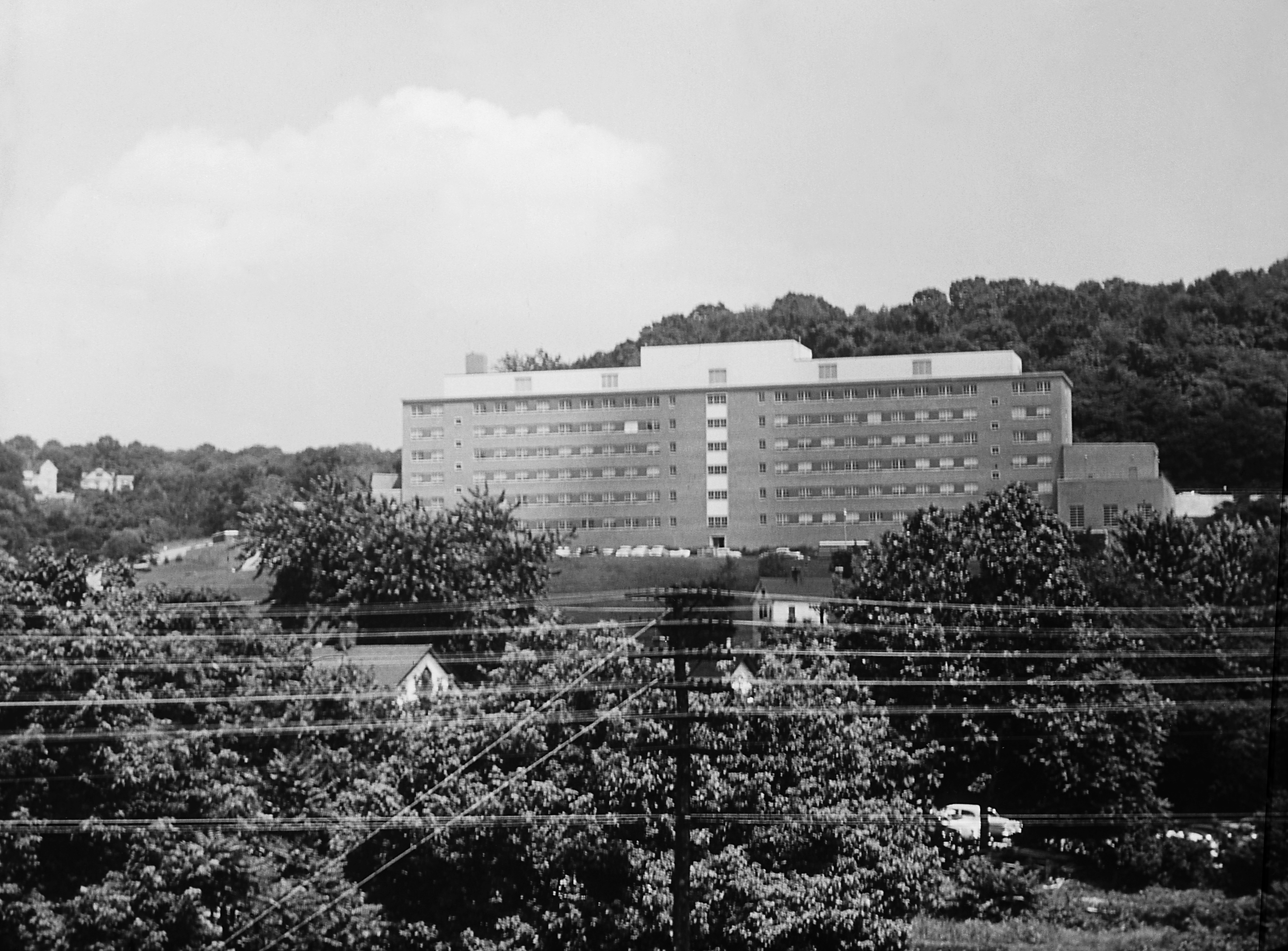
The Environmental Health Divisions' Robert A. Taft Sanitary Engineering Center in Cincinnati in 1957

By 1943, PHS contained eight administrative divisions, plus the National Cancer Institute, St. Elizabeths Hospital, and Freedmen's Hospital under the direct supervision of the Surgeon General. These divisions often had overlapping scopes, which was seen as administratively unwieldy. Additionally, some of these had been created and specified through several pieces of legislation that were inconsistent in their scope, while some had been created internally by PHS or delegated from the parent Federal Security Agency.

In 1943, PHS's divisions were collected into three operating agencies by law (57 Stat. 587). The Bureau of State Services administered cooperative services to U.S. states through technical and financial assistance, the Bureau of Medical Services provided direct patient care through hospitals and clinics as well as foreign quarantine facilities, and the National Institute of Health remained independent to perform laboratory research activities. Additionally, all of the laws affecting the functions of the public health agencies were consolidated for the first time in the Public Health Service Act of 1944.

The mid-20th century was a time of expansion for both NIH and the PHS environmental health programs. In 1948, NIH's name was changed to the plural National Institutes of Health, and by the end of 1950 six new institutes had been created within it. The environmental health programs expanded from water pollution into air, industrial, and chemical pollution and radiological health research during and after World War II, and in 1954 they moved across town from the former Cincinnati Marine Hospital to the newly constructed Robert A. Taft Sanitary Engineering Center.

However, the period was one of decline for the marine hospital system. In 1943, the hospital system had reached its peak of 30 hospitals. During 1944–1953, a wave of closings eliminated nine of the ten Marine Hospitals that had not been upgraded since the 1920s, as well as three newer general hospitals and the tuberculosis sanatorium at Fort Stanton. However, PHS funded construction of hospitals by the states through the 1946 Hill–Burton Act.

In 1951, the Office of Negro Health Work was dissolved after African American advocacy of removing racial barriers in health care. In 1953 the Federal Security Agency was abolished and most of its functions, including the PHS, were transferred to the newly formed Department of Health, Education and Welfare. In 1955 the Division of Indian Health was established upon transfer of these functions from the Bureau of Indian Affairs in the Department of the Interior.

=== Reorganization era ===
Between 1966 and 1973, a series of reorganizations and realignments led to the end of the bureau structure. The reorganization by 1968 replaced PHS's old bureau structure with two new operating agencies: the Health Services and Mental Health Administration (HSMHA) and the Consumer Protection and Environmental Health Service (CPEHS), with NIH remaining independent and less affected by the organization. In 1968, the position of Assistant Secretary for Health was created, supplanting the Surgeon General as the top leader of the Public Health Service, although the Surgeon General was retained in a subordinate role. Also in 1968, the Food and Drug Administration, which traced its origins to 1862, became part of the PHS. The goal of the reorganizations was to coordinate the previously fragmented divisions to provide a holistic approach to large, overarching problems.

Additionally, a second wave of hospital closings during 1965–1970 closed the three remaining general hospitals at inland locations along the Mississippi River and Great Lakes, as well as the 19th-century Savannah hospital. In addition, St. Elizabeths Hospital and the psychiatric hospitals at Lexington and Fort Worth were transferred to other agencies, and the Galveston hospital was replaced with one acquired by PHS in nearby Nassau Bay. This left eight general hospitals plus the National Leprosarium in the system.

The new agencies came to be seen as unwieldy and bureaucratic, and they would turn out to be short-lived. CPEHS was broken up in 1970, as much of it was transferred out of PHS to form the core of the new Environmental Protection Agency. Around the same time, the National Institute for Occupational Safety and Health was created out of the former Division of Industrial Hygiene by the Occupational Safety and Health Act of 1970. HSMHA was broken up into four successor agencies in 1973.

=== Modern period ===
==== Late 20th century ====
Since 1973, PHS has encompassed between six and ten operating agencies anchored by NIH, FDA, and CDC. The organizational changes in the 20th century after 1973 have been:

- Creation of the Agency for Toxic Substances and Disease Registry in 1980
- Merging of the Health Resources Administration and Health Services Administration into the Health Resources and Services Administration (HRSA) in 1982
- The Indian Health Service being split from HRSA in 1988
- The Agency for Health Care Policy and Research being split from the Office of the Assistant Secretary for Health in 1989
- Breakup of the Alcohol, Drug Abuse, and Mental Health Administration in 1992, with its research functions returning to the National Institutes of Health, and its services components becoming the Substance Abuse and Mental Health Services Administration

The PHS hospital system had been the target of efforts to close the entire system since the mid-1970s. As the result of pressure from the Reagan administration, the PHS hospital system was abolished in 1981, with the last eight hospitals transferred to other organizations: five to non-governmental entities, two to the Department of Defense, and one to the State of Louisiana. PHS would however continue to operate the National Leprosarium until 1999.

In 1995, supervision of the agencies within PHS was shifted from the Assistant Secretary for Health to report directly to the Secretary of Health and Human Services, eliminating PHS as an administrative level in the organizational hierarchy, although the agencies and offices are still legally designated as part of PHS.

==== 21st century ====
The Office of Global Affairs was formed from two components within the Office of the Secretary and Office of the Assistant Secretary for Health in 2002.

The Office of Public Health Emergency Preparedness was created in 2002, which in 2022 became the Administration for Strategic Preparedness and Response.

The Advanced Research Projects Agency for Health was created by the Consolidated Appropriations Act, 2022.

== Activities ==
Public health worker Sara Josephine Baker, M.D. established many programs to help the poor in New York City keep their infants healthy, leading teams of nurses into the crowded neighborhoods of Hell's Kitchen and teaching mothers how to dress, feed, and bathe their babies. Another key pioneer of public health in the U.S. was Lillian Wald, who founded the Henry Street Settlement house in New York. The Visiting Nurse Service of New York was a significant organization for bringing health care to the urban poor.

In the area of environmental protection and public health, a Public Health Service 1969 community water survey that looked at more than a thousand drinking water systems across the United States drew two important conclusions that supported a growing demand for stronger protections that were adopted in the 1974 Safe Drinking Water Act. The survey concluded, first, that the state supervision programs were very uneven and often lax, and, second, that the bacteriological quality of the water, particularly among small systems, was of concern.

The 1963 Clean Air Act gave the Public Health Service in the Department of Health, Education, and Welfare the authority to take abatement action against industries if it could be demonstrated that they were polluting across state lines, or if a governor requested. Some of these actions involved the Ohio River Valley, New York, and New Jersey. The service also began monitoring air pollution. the 1967 Clean Air Act redirected attention to larger air quality control regions.

== Controversies ==
=== Tuskegee Study of Untreated Syphilis in the Negro Male ===
In 1932, the Public Health Service, working with the Tuskegee Institute in Tuskegee, Alabama, began a study to record the natural history of syphilis in hopes of justifying treatment programs for blacks. It was titled the Tuskegee Study of Untreated Syphilis in the Negro Male.

The study initially involved 600 black men—399 with syphilis, 201 who did not have the disease. The study was conducted without the benefit of patients' informed consent. Researchers told the men they were being treated for "bad blood", a local term referring to several ailments, including syphilis, anemia, and fatigue. In truth, they did not receive the proper treatment needed to cure their illness. In exchange for taking part in the study, the men received free medical exams, free meals, and burial insurance. Although originally projected to last six months, the study actually went on for 40 years. Penicillin—which can be used to treat syphilis—was discovered in the 1940s. However, the study continued and treatment was never given to the subjects. Because of this, it has been called "arguably the most 'infamous' biomedical research study in U.S. history".

=== Syphilis studies in Guatemala ===
A USPHS physician who took part in the 1932–1972 Tuskegee program, John Charles Cutler, was in charge of the U.S. government's syphilis experiments in Guatemala, in which in the Central American Republic of Guatemala, Guatemalan prisoners, soldiers, orphaned children, and others were deliberately infected with syphilis and other sexually transmitted diseases from 1946 to 1948, in order to scientifically study the disease, in a project funded by a grant from the National Institutes of Health of the United States in Bethesda, Maryland.

Secretary of State Hillary Clinton apologized to the Republic of Guatemala for this program in 2010, in light of the serious ethical lapses in moral judgement which occurred.

== See also ==
- Cadet Nurse Corps
- Commissioned Officers Association of the U.S. Public Health Service
- Health belief model
- History of public health in the United States
- Human experimentation in the United States
- Lucy Minnigerode, first superintendent of the U. S. Public Health Service Nursing Corps
- Narcotic Farms Act of 1929
- Public Health Service Act
- Title 42 appointment
