= PREPA =

PREPA or prepa may refer to:

- Public Readiness and Emergency Preparedness Act
- Puerto Rico Electric Power Authority
- Classe préparatoire aux grandes écoles, part of the French educational system

== See also ==
- Prepa
