= Rear admiral (United States) =

Flag officer rank of the USN, USCG, USPHS, and NOAA Corps

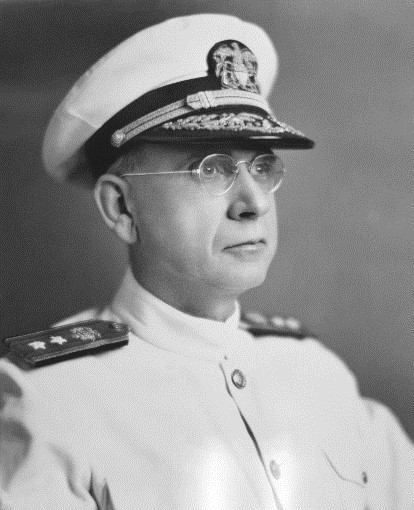
Rear Admiral Joseph Walter Mountin of the U.S. Public Health Service Commissioned Corps wearing two-star rank insignia

A rear admiral is one of two distinct ranks of commissioned officers in four of the uniformed services of the United States; "rear admiral (lower half)", a one-star flag officer, and "rear admiral", a two-star flag officer. The two ranks are only utilized by the United States Navy, U.S. Coast Guard, U.S. Public Health Service Commissioned Corps, the National Oceanic and Atmospheric Administration Commissioned Officer Corps, and the U.S. Maritime Service. In contrast, in most other nations' rank-bearing services the term "rear admiral" refers exclusively to two-star flag officer rank.

== History ==
Before the American Civil War, the U.S. Navy had resisted creating the rank of admiral. Instead, they preferred the term "flag officer", in order to distinguish the rank from the traditions of the European navies. During the American Civil War, the U.S. Congress honored David Farragut's successful assault on the city of New Orleans by creating the rank of rear admiral on July 16, 1862.

During World War II, the U.S. Navy and the U.S. Coast Guard both had a temporary appointment, one-star rank of commodore, that was used in limited circumstances. By the end of the war, all incumbents had been advanced to the rank of two-star rear admiral and the commodore rank was abolished in both services. Both the Navy and the Coast Guard divided their rear admirals into "lower half" and full rear admirals, or "upper half", the former being paid at the same rate as a one-star brigadier general in the U.S. Army, U.S. Marine Corps and the newly independent U.S. Air Force. Lower-half rear admirals were eventually advanced to full rear admirals, or upper half status, where they would receive pay equivalent to a two-star major general. However, both categories of rear admiral wore two-star insignia, an issue that was a source of consternation to the other services.

At the same time, the Navy also bestowed the title of commodore on selected U.S. Navy captains who commanded multiple subordinate units, such as destroyer squadrons, submarine squadrons and air wings and air groups not designated as carrier air wings or carrier air groups. Although not flag officers, these officers were entitled to a personal blue and white command pennant containing the initials, acronym abbreviation or numerical designation of their command.

In 1981, Pub. L. 97–86 expanded commodore from a title to an official permanent grade by creating the one-star rank of commodore admiral. After only 11 months, the rank was reverted to just commodore but kept the one-star insignia. However, this caused issues with the Navy due to the difficulty in differentiating those commodores who were flag officers from commodores who were senior captains in certain command positions. Then in 1985, Pub. L. 99–145 renamed commodore to the current grade of rear admiral (lower half) effective on November 8, 1985.

Up until 1981 all rear admirals wore two stars on their shoulder boards and rank insignia. Since then, rear admirals (lower half) wear one star while rear admirals wear two; verbal address remains "rear admiral" for both ranks. On correspondence, where the rear admiral's rank is spelled out, the acronym (LH) and (UH) follows the rear admiral's rank title to distinguish between one and two stars.

Beginning around 2001, the Navy, Coast Guard, and NOAA Corps started using the separate rank abbreviations RDML (one star) and RADM (two stars), while the Public Health Service continued to use the abbreviation RADM for both. The Public Health Service formally adopted the RDML abbreviation for the O-7 pay grade in 2022.

As flag officers, the flags flown for rear admirals of the unrestricted line of the U.S. Navy have one or two white, single-point-up stars on blue fields for the lower half or upper half, respectively. The flags of restricted line officers and staff corps officers have blue stars on a white field. All services officially list the two-star grade as rear admiral and not rear admiral (upper half) as stated by 10 U.S.C. § 8111 and 37 U.S.C. § 201 of the U.S. Code of law. However, the four uniformed services will sometimes list the rank as rear admiral (upper half) to help the general public distinguish between the two grades.

== Rear admiral ==
Rear admiral
- Rank flag of a U.S. Navy rear admiral

- The shoulder star, shoulder boards, and sleeve stripes of a U.S. Navy rear admiral (line officer)
- Country: United States
- Service branch: United States Navy; United States Coast Guard; United States Public Health Service Commissioned Corps; NOAA Commissioned Officer Corps; US Maritime Service
- Abbreviation: RADM
- Rank group: Flag officer
- Rank: Two-star
- NATO rank code: OF-7
- Pay grade: O-8
- Formation: 1862
- Next higher rank: Vice admiral
- Next lower rank: Rear admiral (lower half)
- Equivalent ranks: Major general (uniformed services of the United States)

Rear admiral (abbreviated as RADM, informally "rear admiral (upper half)"), is a two-star flag officer, with the pay grade of O-8 in the United States Navy, the United States Coast Guard, the United States Public Health Service Commissioned Corps, the National Oceanic and Atmospheric Administration Commissioned Officer Corps and the United States Maritime Service.

Rear admiral ranks above rear admiral (lower half) and below vice admiral. Rear admiral is equivalent to the rank of major general in the U.S. Army, Air Force, Marine Corps, and Space Force. It is the highest permanent rank during peacetime in the uniformed services. All higher ranks are temporary ranks and linked to their specific commands or office and expire with the expiration of their term of command or office.

U.S. Navy, U.S. Coast Guard, USPHSCC, NOAACOC shoulder insignia of a rear admiral

The collar stars, shoulder boards, and sleeve stripes of a U.S. Coast Guard rear admiral

The collar stars, shoulder boards, and sleeve stripes of a U.S. Public Health Service Commissioned Corps rear admiral

The collar stars, shoulder boards, and sleeve stripes of a National Oceanic and Atmospheric Administration Commissioned Officer Corps rear admiral

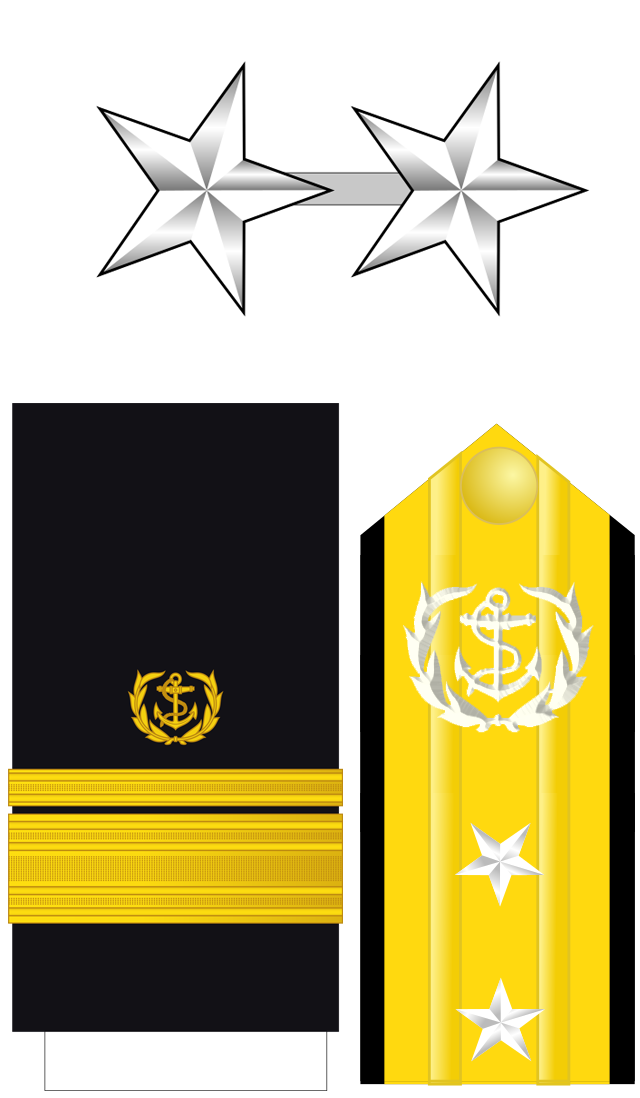
The collar stars, shoulder boards, and sleeve stripes of a U.S. Maritime Service rear admiral
Rank flag of a U.S. Coast Guard rear admiral

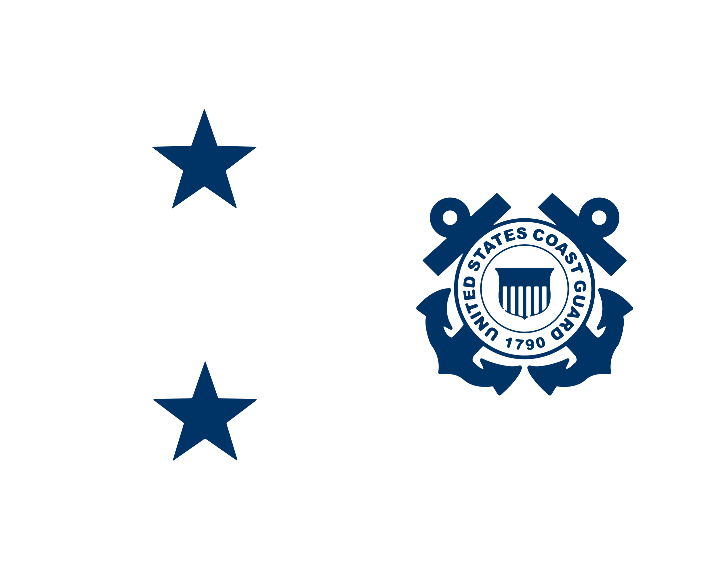
Flag of a U.S. Coast Guard restricted line officer / staff officer rear admiral

Rank flag of a U.S. Public Health Service Commissioned Corps rear admiral serving as deputy surgeon general of the United States

Rank flag of a U.S. Public Health Service Commissioned Corps rear admiral

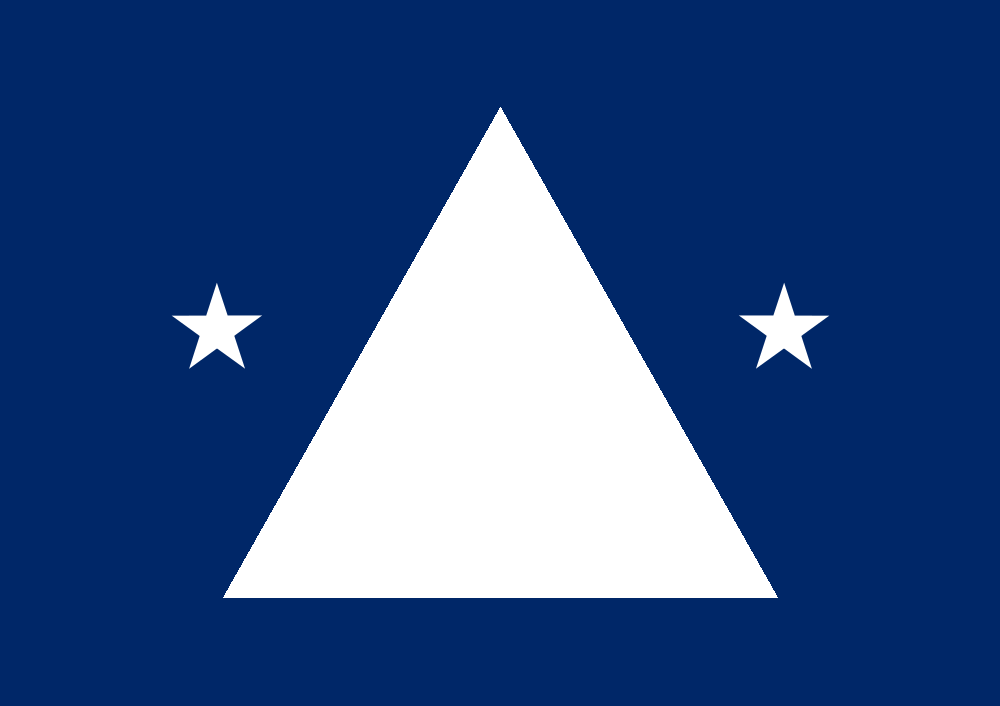
Rank flag of a NOAA Commissioned Officer Corps rear admiral

Flag of a U.S. Navy restricted line officer / staff officer rear admiral

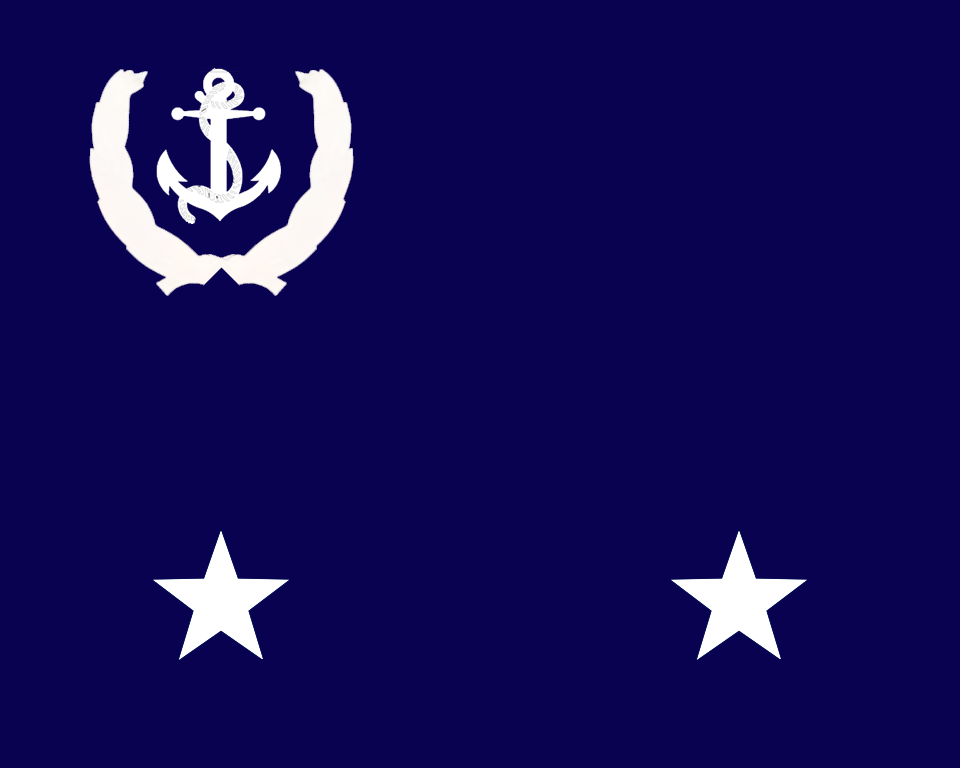
Flag of a U.S. Maritime Service rear admiral (U.S. Merchant Marine Academy superintendent)

== Rear admiral (lower half) ==
Rear admiral (lower half)
- Rank flag of a U.S. Navy rear admiral (lower half)

- The shoulder star, shoulder boards, and sleeve stripes of a U.S. Navy rear admiral (lower half) (line officer)
- Country: United States
- Service branch: United States Navy; United States Coast Guard; United States Public Health Service Commissioned Corps; NOAA Commissioned Officer Corps; U.S. Maritime Service
- Abbreviation: RDML
- Rank group: Flag officer
- Rank: One-star
- NATO rank code: OF-6
- Pay grade: O-7
- Formation: 1985
- Next higher rank: Rear admiral
- Next lower rank: Captain
- Equivalent ranks: Brigadier general (uniformed services of the United States); Commodore (most other anglophone naval forces)

Rear admiral (lower half) (abbreviated as RDML) is a one-star flag officer, with the pay grade of O-7 in the United States Navy, the United States Coast Guard, the United States Public Health Service Commissioned Corps, and the National Oceanic and Atmospheric Administration Commissioned Officer Corps.

Rear admiral (lower half) ranks above captain and below rear admiral. Rear admiral (lower half) is equivalent to the rank of brigadier general in the United States Army, Air Force, Marine Corps, and Space Force and equivalent to the rank of commodore in most other navies. In the United States uniformed services, rear admiral (lower half) replaced the rank of commodore in 1985.

U.S. Navy, U.S. Coast Guard, U.S. PHS, NOAA rank insignia of a rear admiral (lower half)

The collar star, shoulder boards, and sleeve stripes of a U.S. Coast Guard rear admiral (lower half)

The collar star, shoulder boards, and sleeve stripes of a U.S. Public Health Service rear admiral (lower half)

The collar star, shoulder boards, and sleeve stripes of a National Oceanic and Atmospheric Administration rear admiral (lower half)

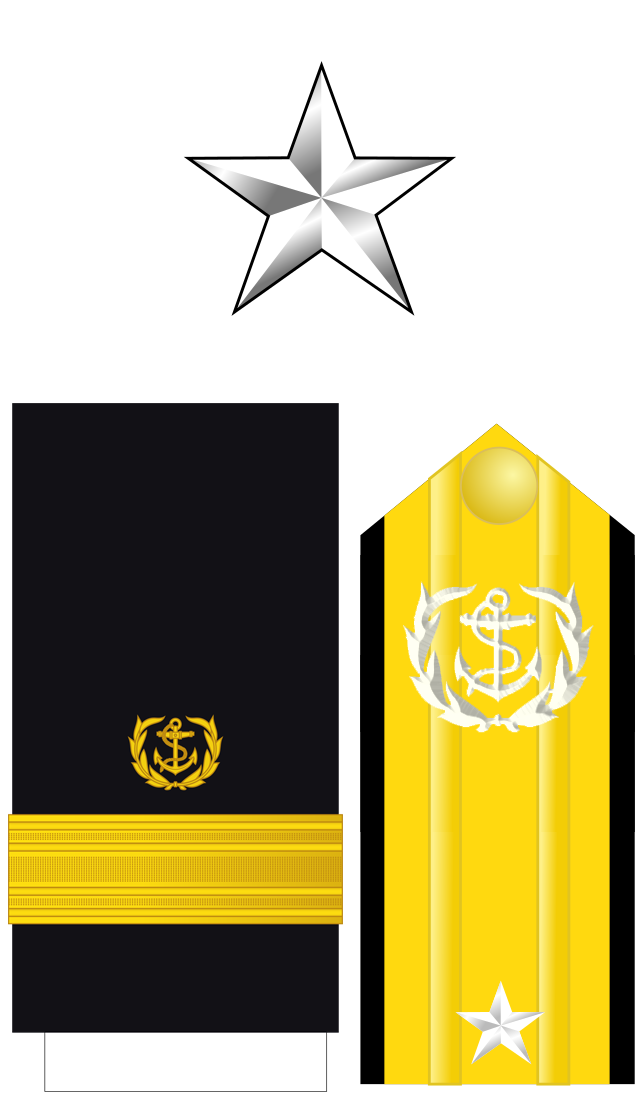
The collar star, shoulder boards, and sleeve stripes of a U.S. Maritime Service rear admiral (lower half)
Rank flag of a U.S. Coast Guard rear admiral (lower half)

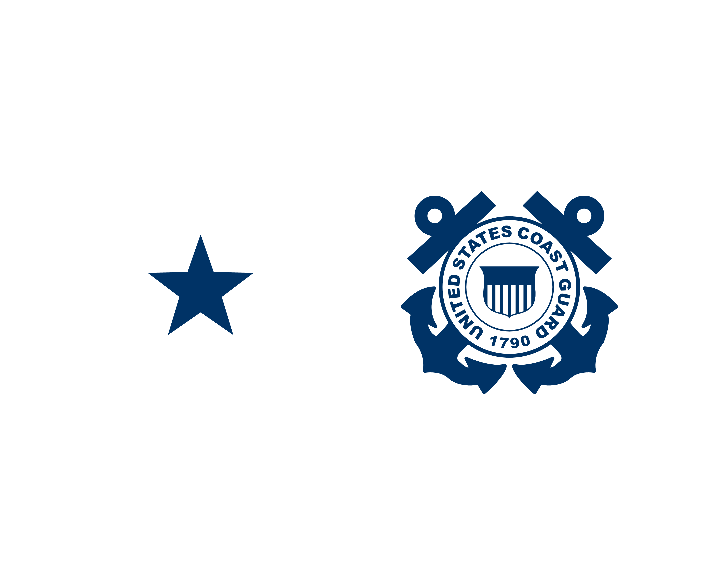
Flag of a U.S. Coast Guard restricted line officer / staff officer rear admiral lower half

Rank flag of a U.S. Public Health Service rear admiral (lower half)

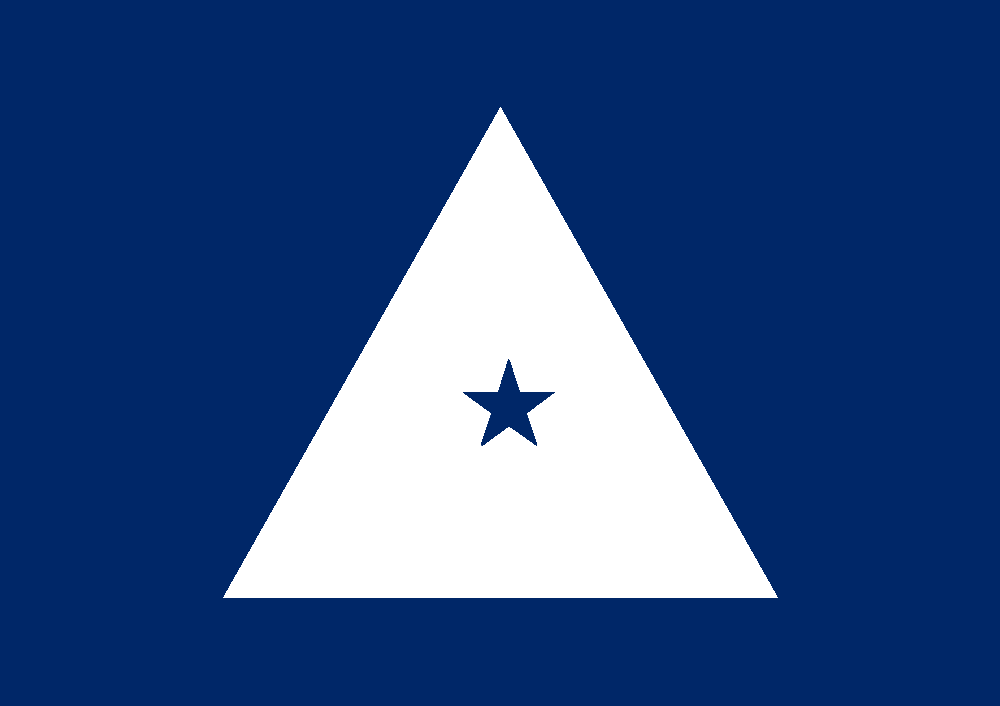
Rank flag of a NOAA Commissioned Officer Corps rear admiral (lower half)

Flag of a U.S. Navy restricted line officer / staff officer rear admiral lower half

== Statutory limits ==
By statute, Congress has expressly limited the total number of flag officers that may be on active duty at any given time. The total number of active duty flag officers is capped at 162 for the Regular Navy, augmented by a smaller number of additional flag officers in the Navy Reserve who are either on full-time active duty, temporary active duty, or on the Reserve Active Status List as part-time drilling reservists. Some of these billets are reserved or set by statute. For example, the deputy judge advocate general of the Navy is a two-star rear admiral in the Navy. A newer statute enacted in 2016 lowers the cap on the total number of active duty flag officers in the Department of Defense to 151, effective December 31, 2022.

In the Public Health Service Commissioned Corps, at least half of the Assistant Surgeons General are one-star rear admirals and no more than half are two-star rear admirals. The Coast Guard's chief medical officer is also a commissioned corps two-star rear admiral, on assignment to the Coast Guard. Officers serving in certain intelligence positions are not counted against the statutory limit.

== Promotion, appointment, and tour length ==
For the Navy and the Coast Guard, to be promoted to the permanent grade of rear admiral (lower half) or rear admiral, officers who are eligible for promotion to these ranks are screened by an in-service promotion board composed of other flag officers from their branch of service. This promotion board then generates a list of officers it recommends for promotion to flag rank. This list is then sent to the service secretary and the joint chiefs for review before it can be sent to the president, through the defense secretary, for consideration.

The president nominates officers to be promoted from this list with the advice of the secretary of defense, the service secretary, and if applicable, the service's chief of staff or commandant. The president may nominate any eligible officer who is not on the recommended list if it serves in the interest of the nation, but this is uncommon. The Senate must then confirm the nominee by a majority vote before the officer can be promoted. Once confirmed, a nominee is promoted by assuming an office that requires or allows an officer to hold that rank. For one-star or two-star positions of office that are reserved by statute, the President nominates an officer for appointment to fill that position. For the Navy and the Coast Guard, because the one-star and two-star grades are permanent ranks, the nominee may still be screened by an in-service promotion board to add their input on the nominee before the nomination can be sent to the Senate for approval. For the Public Health Service Commissioned Corps, both the one-star and two-star rank are achieved by appointment from the president, or from their department secretary, and do not require senatorial approval. For the NOAA Commissioned Officer Corps, the one-star rank is achieved by appointment from the president, or from their department secretary, and do not require senatorial approval, however appointment to the two-star rank must be approved by the Senate.

The standard tour length for most rear admiral positions is three years, but some are set at four or more years by statute. For the Navy, Coast Guard, and NOAA Corps, both grades of rear admiral are permanent ranks and do not expire when the officer vacates a one-star or two-star position. The Public Health Service Commissioned Corps, however, employs permanent promotions in both grades of rear admiral as well as position-linked temporary appointments in both grades (e.g., assistant surgeons general). Their temporary ranks expires when those officers vacate certain temporary positions of office designated to bear those ranks.

== Tradition ==
By tradition in the United States Navy, when an officer is selected or appointed to flag rank, all current Navy flag officers write the selectee a letter congratulating him or her for attaining flag officer status.

== Retirement ==
Other than voluntary retirement, federal statutes set a number of mandates for retirement. All one-star officers must retire after five years in grade or 30 years of service, whichever is later, unless they are selected or appointed for promotion or reappointed to grade to serve longer. All two-star officers must retire after five years in grade or 35 years of service, whichever is later, unless appointed for promotion or reappointed to grade to serve longer. Otherwise all flag officers must retire the month after their 64th birthday. However, the secretary of defense can defer a flag officer's retirement until the officer's 66th birthday and the president can defer it until the officer's 68th birthday. Flag officers typically retire well in advance of the statutory age and service limits, so as not to impede the upward career mobility of their juniors.

== United States Maritime Service ==
Although it exists largely as a maritime training organization, the United States Maritime Service does use the ranks of rear admiral (upper half) and rear admiral (lower half). By law, the Service has the same rank structure as the United States Coast Guard, but its uniforms are more similar to the United States Navy.

== See also ==
- United States Navy officer rank insignia
- United States Coast Guard officer rank insignia
