= Robert J. Anderson =

Robert J. Anderson may refer to:

- Bobby Anderson (actor) (1933–2008), American actor and television producer
- Robert J. Anderson (public health administrator) (1914–1999), director of the Centers for Disease Control and Prevention
