= U.S. Public Health Service reorganizations of 1966–1973 =

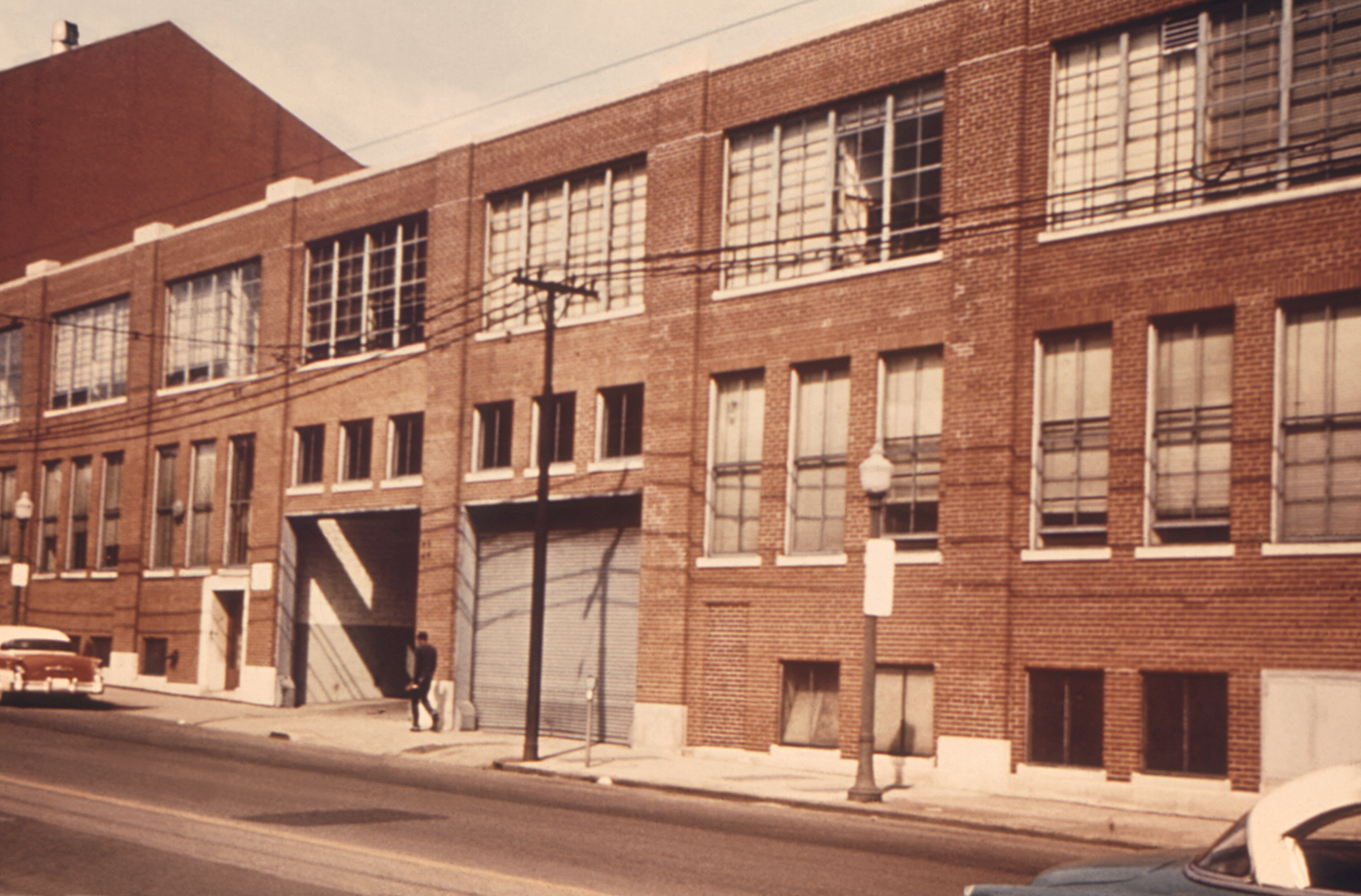
NIOSH's main laboratories in Downtown Cincinnati in 1974. During the period 1966–1973, the organization would pass through 7 operating agencies (Bureau of State Services, Bureau of Disease Prevention and Environmental Control, CPEHS, Environmental Health Service, OASH, HSMHA, CDC), and bear 4 names (Division of Occupational Health, Occupational Health Program, Bureau of Occupational Safety and Health, National Institute for Occupational Health). While an extreme case, this was not unusual for Public Health Service divisions during this period.

Between 1966 and 1973, a series of reorganizations occurred of the United States Public Health Service (PHS) within the Department of Health, Education and Welfare (HEW). The reorganization by 1968 replaced PHS's old bureau structure with two new operating agencies: the Health Services and Mental Health Administration (HSMHA) and the Consumer Protection and Environmental Health Service (CPEHS). The goal of the reorganizations was to coordinate the previously fragmented divisions to provide a holistic approach to large, overarching problems.

However, the new agencies came to be seen as unwieldy and bureaucratic, and they would turn out to be short-lived. CPEHS was broken up in 1970, as most of it was transferred out of PHS to form the core of the new Environmental Protection Agency. HSMHA was broken up in 1973. This left PHS with six operating agencies, a configuration substantially similar to the current one as of 2021.

In all, PHS had at least eight discrete reorganizations in as many years. The quick succession of reorganizations created several operating agencies that existed for a short time, as individual components were shifted between them. This was in contrast to the decades prior and afterwards, in which organizational changes were incremental and did not substantively change the overall organizational structure of PHS.

== Organization prior to 1966 ==
PHS first created internal divisions in 1899, when it was still called the Marine Hospital Service. Its only major reorganization since then had occurred in 1943, which collected its several divisions into three operating agencies: the Bureau of Medical Services (BMS), Bureau of State Services (BSS), and National Institutes of Health (NIH), plus the administrative Office of the Surgeon General (OSG). This setup persisted unto 1966, although there were minor reorganizations of the individual divisions within the agencies. After 1960, BSS grouped its divisions into Community Health Divisions and Environmental Health Divisions.

By 1966, predecessors of several current organizations were recognizable. NIH was already an operating agency; the Division of Indian Health and Division of Hospitals were part of BMS; the National Communicable Disease Center, Division of Occupational Health, and National Center for Radiological Health were all part of BSS's Environmental Health Divisions; and the National Center for Health Statistics was part of OSG. The Food and Drug Administration was part of HEW, but not yet part of PHS.

== Reorganizations ==
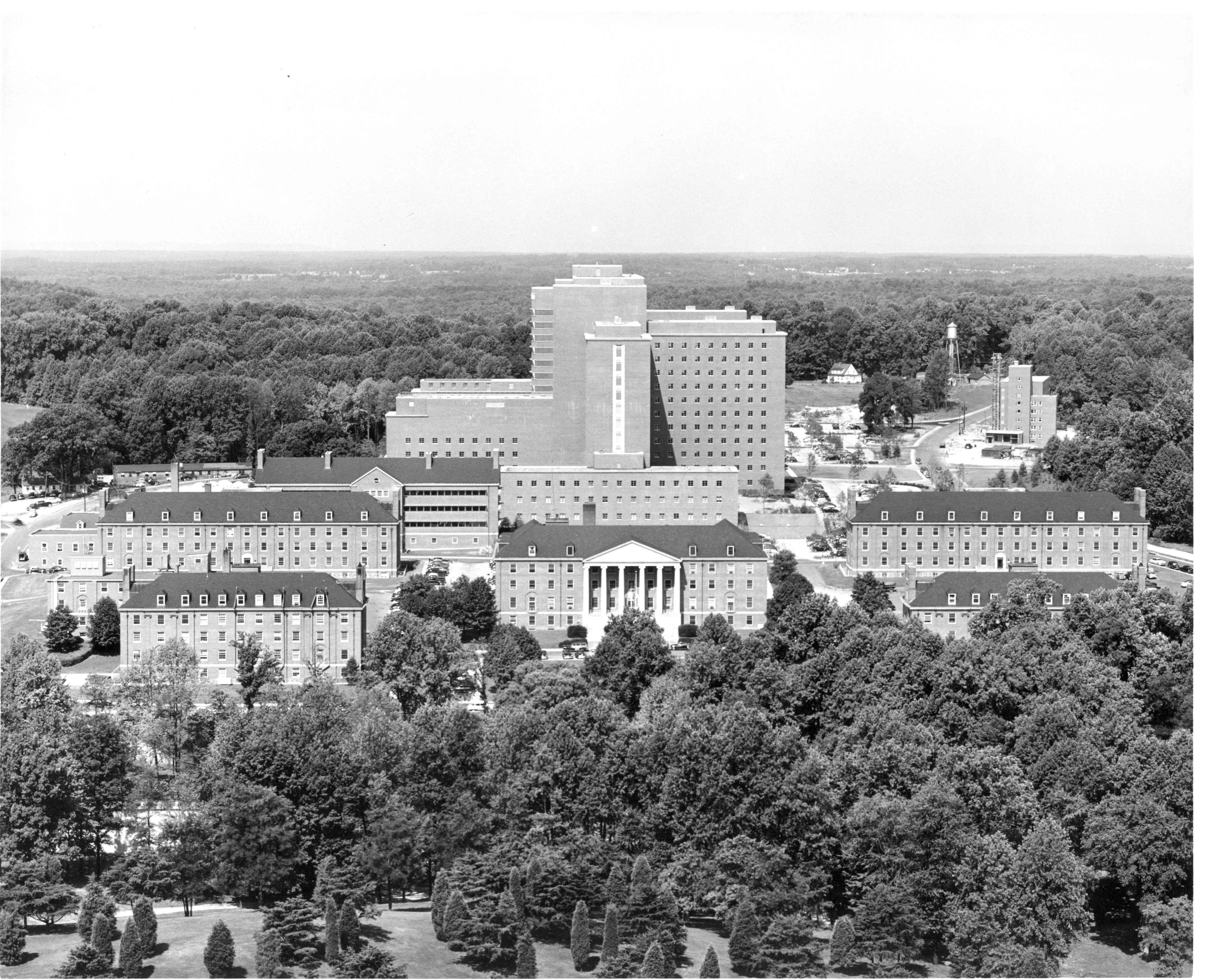
Campus of the National Institutes of Health (NIH) in Bethesda, Maryland around 1963. Although NIH would be largely unaffected by the reorganizations, the National Institute of Mental Health would be transferred to HSMHA in 1968, and then to the new Alcohol, Drug Abuse, and Mental Health Administration in 1973. It would not return to NIH until 1992.

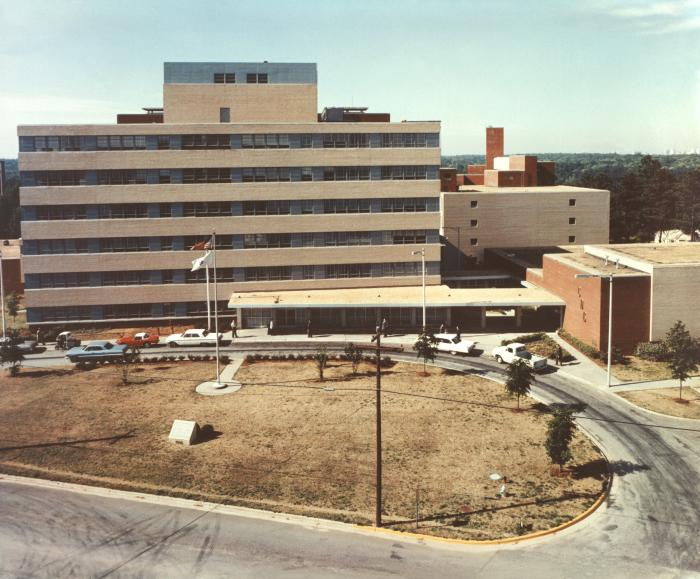
Communicable Disease Center headquarters in Atlanta in 1963. After being renamed the National Communicable Disease Center in 1967, it would find a home in HSMHA, change its name again to Center for Disease Control in 1970, and be promoted to operating agency status in 1973.

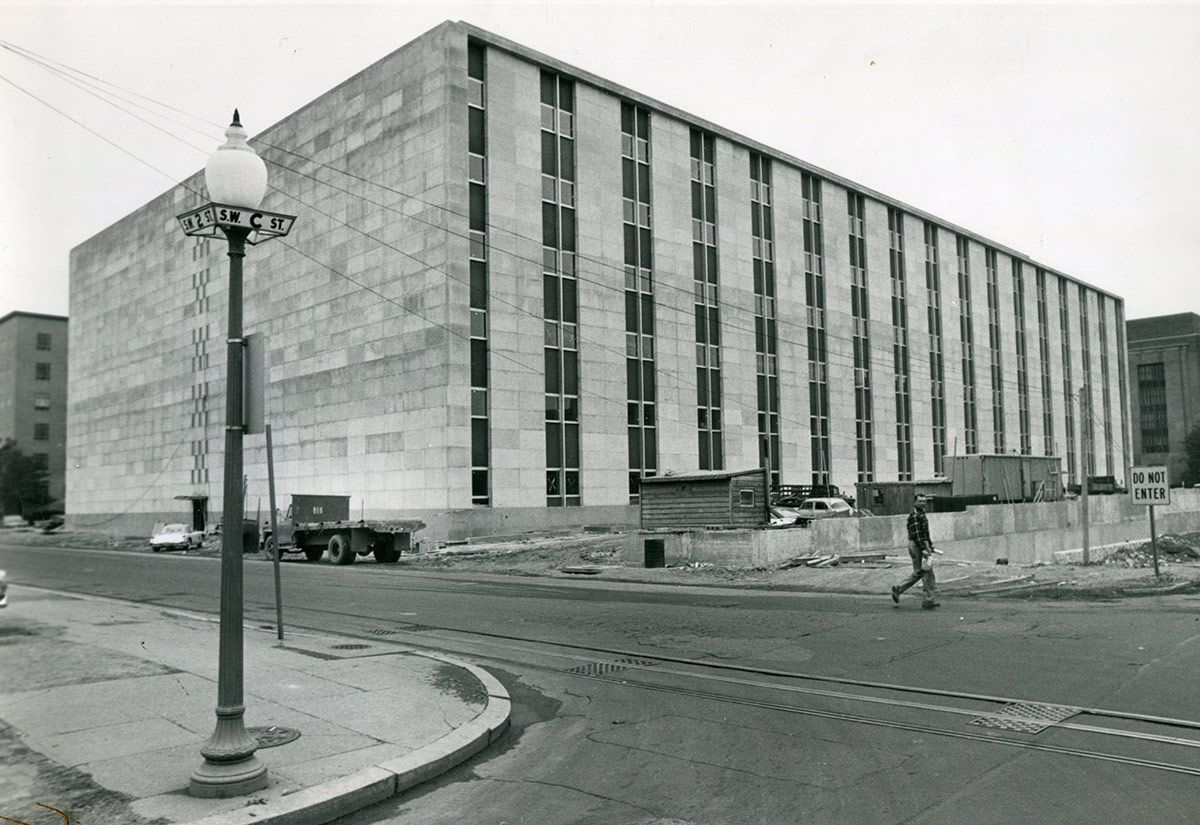
Food and Drug Administration (FDA) headquarters in Washington, D.C. around 1963. FDA was moved into the PHS in 1968 as part of CPEHS, and became its own operating agency under PHS in 1970.

=== Initial reorganizations ===
The initial reorganizations of the operating divisions was accomplished during 1966–1968 in two waves. An initial reorganization into a five-bureau structure was accomplished in 1967. The new bureau system was oriented around "national centers", with larger divisions simply being renamed, and smaller divisions being combined as programs within the national centers. For example, the Division of Radiological Health became the National Center for Radiological Health, the Communicable Disease Center became the National Communicable Disease Center, and several divisions relating to environmental and occupational health were merged into the National Center for Urban and Industrial Health.

However, this system would be short-lived as a more radical reorganization was carried out in 1968. The purpose of the 1968 reorganization was to create agencies that could coordinate the relationships between divisions with similar focus, providing a holistic rather than fragmented approach. HSMHA in particular was created with the recognition that, with the recent creation of Medicare and Medicaid increasing financing of healthcare, increased demand was straining healthcare delivery resources. CPEHS stemmed from a belief that environmental health concerned not only a person's natural environment but also the products they consumed.

Ultimately four discrete reorganization orders would occur during this period: Reorganization Plan No. 3 of 1966; HEW reorganization order of April 1, 1968; HEW reorganization order of July 1, 1968; and HSMHA reorganization of October 31, 1968. The collective effect of these reorganizations was to split BSS split three ways into an interim bureau structure, with each part having a different destination:

- BSS's communicable disease control and environmental health divisions became part of the Bureau of Disease Prevention and Environmental Control. This would absorb the Food and Drug Administration (which was previously part of HEW but not PHS) and lose the National Communicable Disease Center to become the Consumer Protection and Environmental Health Service (CPEHS).
- BSS's community health and hospital construction divisions would be absorbed by the Bureau of Medical Services to form the Bureau of Health Services. This would absorb the National Institute of Mental Health from NIH, as well as the National Communicable Disease Center to become the Health Services and Mental Health Administration (HSMHA).
- BSS's training and professional development divisions became the Bureau of Health Manpower, which was absorbed by NIH.

The rapid shifts in organizational names and structures did not go unnoticed. One employee recalled that a common joke at the time was, "If my boss calls me while I'm gone, find out who it is." A 1969 publication about CPEHS contained the editor's note, "Another reorganization of the Food and Drug Administration has occurred since this paper was prepared. Even though these organizational details are no longer accurate, the paper is being published..." The resulting organizations came to be seen as large and unwieldy.

Another effect of the reorganizations was the creation of the position of Assistant Secretary for Health, a political appointee who supplanted the Surgeon General as the head of the PHS. This was seen as undermining the chain of command of the PHS Commissioned Corps, beginning a long-term shift where Commissioned Corps officers were more responsible to the agencies they were stationed in than to the Corps itself.

By the end of 1968, PHS's operating divisions were the National Institutes of Health, HSMHA, and CPEHS, the last two of which were organized as follows:

Health Services and Mental Health Administration	Consumer Protection and Environmental Health Service
National Center for Health Services Research and Development; National Center for Health Statistics; National Communicable Disease Center; National Institute of Mental Health; Health Facilities Planning and Construction Service; Community Health Service; Regional Medical Programs Service; Indian Health Service; Federal Health Programs Service	Environmental Control Administration; Bureau of Occupational Safety and Health; Bureau of Radiation Health; Bureau of Community Environmental Management; Bureau of Water Hygiene; Bureau of Solid Waste Management; National Air Pollution Control Administration; Food and Drug Administration

=== Breakup of Consumer Protection and Environmental Health Service ===
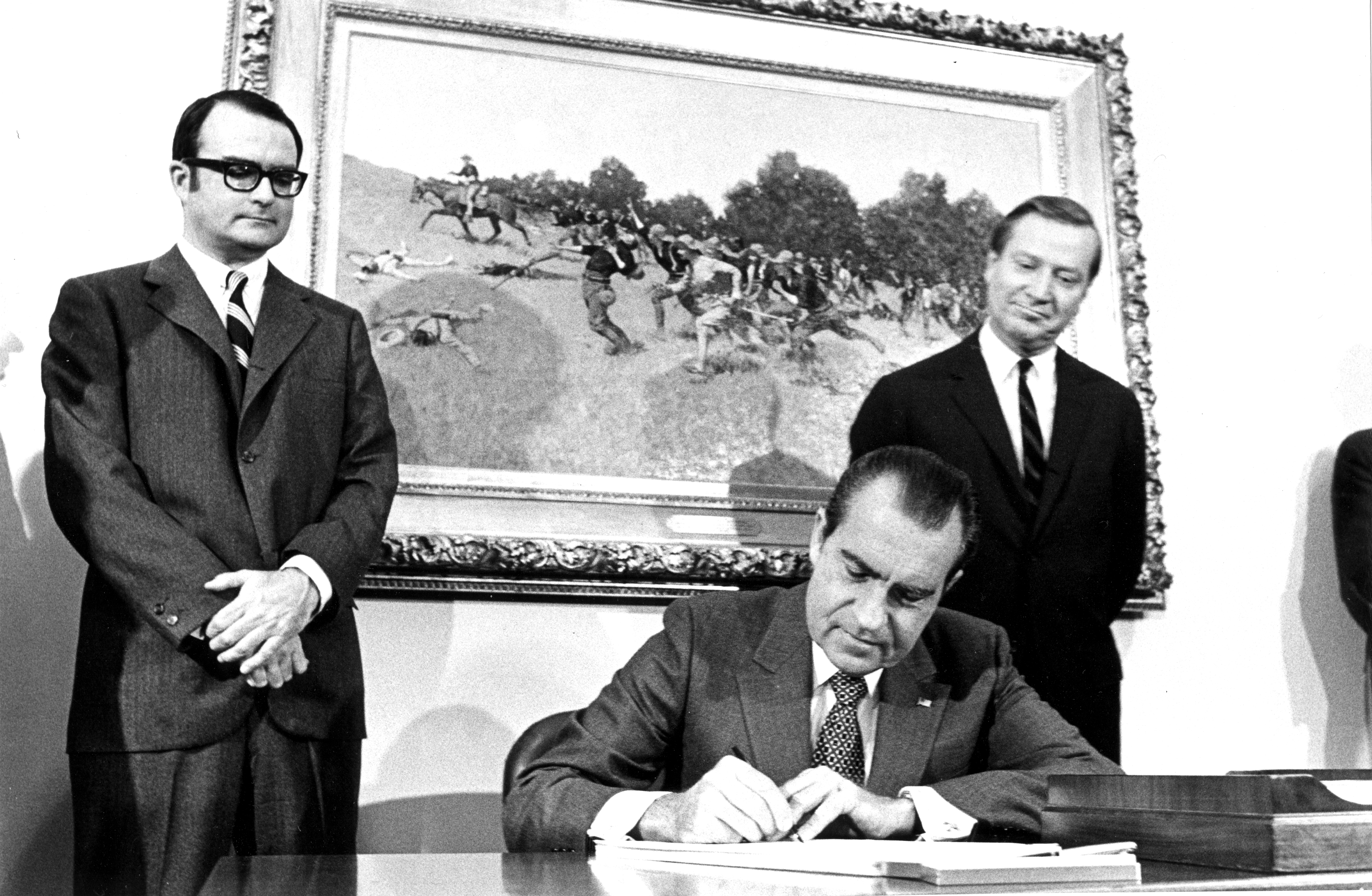
President Richard Nixon signing the Clean Air Amendments of 1970. Along with the National Environmental Policy Act, it provided the context in which Reorganization Plan No. 3 of 1970 was enacted, creating the Environmental Protection Agency and leading to the demise of CPEHS.

The breakup of CPEHS was largely a consequence of the formation of the Environmental Protection Agency (EPA) in 1970, as the result of a desire by the new Nixon administration to gather all federal environmental activities into a single autonomous regulatory body. During 1970–1971, most of the CPEHS was moved out of PHS and HEW to form the core of the newly created EPA. This was accomplished in two phases, with the HEW reorganization order of January 16, 1970 and Reorganization Plan No. 3 of 1970.

Some CPEHS components remained within PHS. The Food and Drug Administration had already become its own operating division within the PHS earlier in 1970, causing CPEHS to be briefly renamed simply the Environmental Health Service. On the other hand, the entire National Air Pollution Control Administration was moved to EPA.

The Environmental Control Administration's five bureaus were spit between PHS and EPA. PHS retained the Bureau of Occupational Safety and Health, which moved into HSMHA and soon became NIOSH; part of the Bureau of Radiological Health, which moved into FDA; and the Bureau of Community Environmental Management, which was later absorbed by EPA and CDC in 1973. The Bureau of Solid Waste Management, Bureau of Water Hygiene, and the rest of the Bureau of Radiological Health were transferred to EPA in 1971.

=== Breakup of Health Services and Mental Health Administration ===
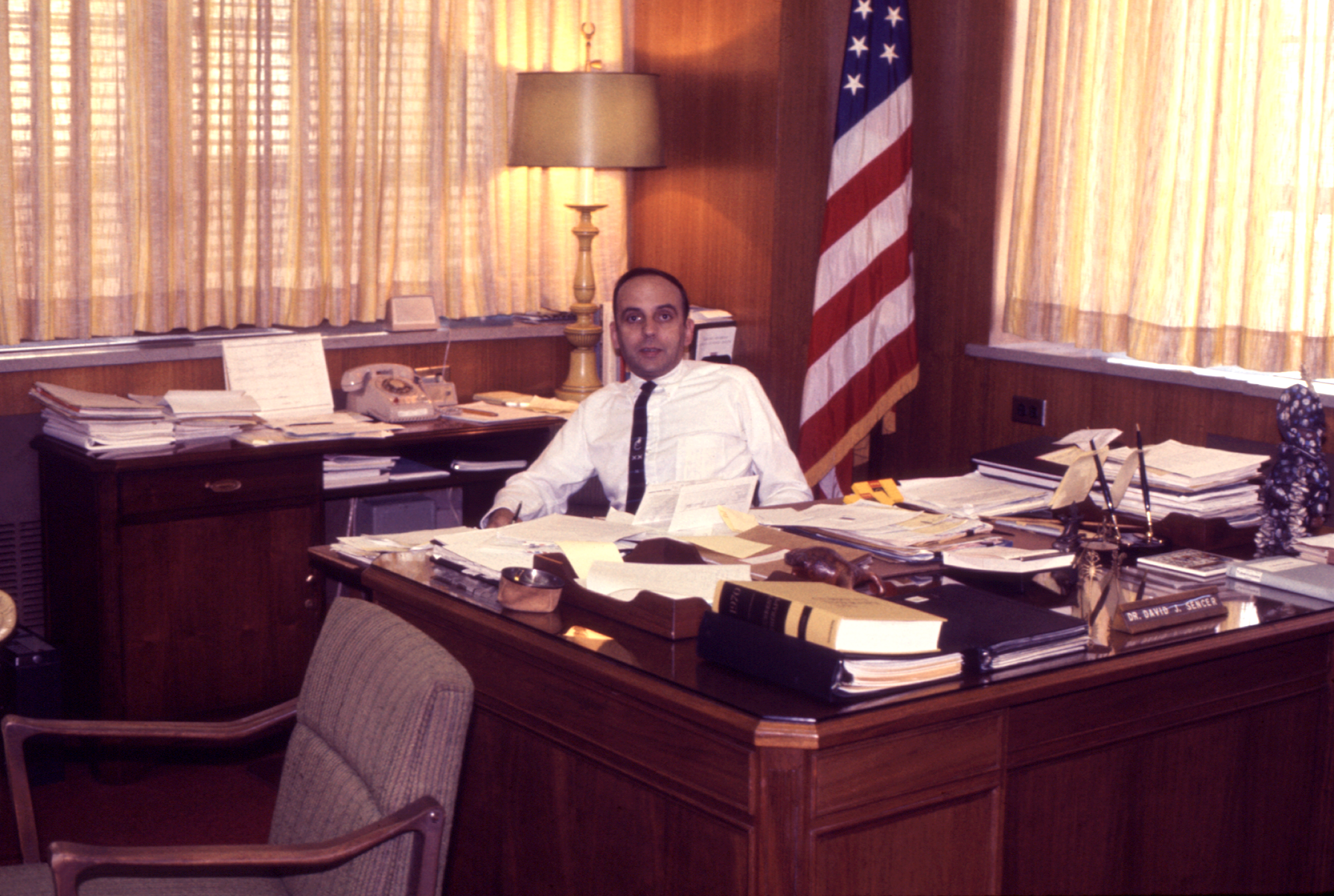
Center for Disease Control Director David Sencer in 1970. At this time he was also serving as the acting Administrator of HSMHA; he would preside over its breakup a few years later.

HSMHA was unpopular with many in PHS, as they felt that it shifted the focus from PHS physicians to department bureaucrats. In addition, National Communicable Disease Center Director David Sencer became acting HSMHA Administrator at the beginning of the Nixon Administration in 1969. HSMHA was reportedly referred to as "HSMA-ha-ha-ha" at NCDC headquarters, and Sencer was seeking to expand NCDC's scope by absorbing other components of HSMHA. As part of this, NCDC was renamed to Center for Disease Control in 1970.

Under the HEW reorganization order of July 1, 1973, HSMHA was abolished. The Center for Disease Control became its own operating agency within the PHS, and absorbed NIOSH. The remaining functions of HSMHA were assigned to newly established Health Services Administration and Health Resources Administration, the latter of which also acquired the Bureau of Health Manpower from NIH. Finally, under the HEW reorganization order of September 25, 1973, a new operating agency, the Alcohol, Drug Abuse, and Mental Health Administration, incorporated the National Institute of Mental Health as well as the recently created National Institute on Alcohol Abuse and Alcoholism and National Institute on Drug Abuse.

== Later developments ==
By the end of 1973, PHS had the following operating agencies:

- National Institutes of Health
- Food and Drug Administration
- Center for Disease Control
- Alcohol, Drug Abuse, and Mental Health Administration
- Health Resources Administration
- Health Services Administration

This overall organizational structure has not substantially changed as of 2021, although there have been a few new operating agencies and minor reorganizations.

In 1980, the Agency for Toxic Substances and Disease Registry was created. The Health Resources Administration and Health Services Administration would merge in 1982 to form the Health Resources and Services Administration. Two new PHS operating agencies were then formed by promoting divisions out of other operating agencies: the Indian Health Service split from the Health Resources and Services Administration in 1988, and the Agency for Health Care Policy and Research split from the Office of the Assistant Secretary for Health in 1989.

In 1992, the Alcohol, Drug Abuse, and Mental Health Administration was abolished, with its three institutes and their research programs moved into NIH, and their treatment functions split off to form the new Substance Abuse and Mental Health Services Administration.

In 2022, the Administration for Strategic Preparedness and Response was elevated from a staff office to an operating division, and the Advanced Research Projects Agency for Health was created.

== Summary table ==
Division (name as of 1968, link to current successor)	Direct predecessor	Before 1966	1968–1970	After 1973
National Institute of Mental Health	same	NIH	HSMHA	ADAMHA
Regional Medical Programs Service	same	NIH	HSMHA	abolished
Indian Health Service	Division of Indian Health	BMS	HSMHA	HSA
Federal Health Programs Service	Division of Hospitals	BMS	HSMHA	HSA
Health Facilities Planning and Construction Service	Division of Hospital and Medical Facilities	BMS	HSMHA	HRA
National Center for Health Statistics	same	OSG	HSMHA	HRA
National Center for Health Services Research and Development	Division of Chronic Diseases	BSS/CH	HSMHA	HRA
Community Health Service	Division of Community Health Practice	BSS/CH	HSMHA	HRA
National Communicable Disease Center	Communicable Disease Center	BSS/CH	HSMHA	operating agency of PHS
Bureau of Health Manpower	Division of Nursing; Division of Dental Public Health and Resources	BSS/CH	NIH	HRA
Bureau of Occupational Safety and Health	Division of Occupational Health	BSS/EH	CPEHS/ECA	CDC
Bureau of Radiation Health	Division of Radiological Health	BSS/EH	CPEHS/ECA	FDA
Bureau of Community Environmental Management	Division of Water Supply and Pollution Control; Division of Environmental Engineering and Food Protection	BSS/EH	CPEHS/ECA	abolished
Bureau of Water Hygiene	Division of Water Supply and Pollution Control; Division of Environmental Engineering and Food Protection	BSS/EH	CPEHS/ECA	EPA
Bureau of Solid Waste Management	Division of Water Supply and Pollution Control; Division of Environmental Engineering and Food Protection	BSS/EH	CPEHS/ECA	EPA
National Air Pollution Control Administration	Division of Air Pollution	BSS/EH	CPEHS	EPA
Food and Drug Administration	same	not in PHS	CPEHS	operating agency of PHS

Key:

- PHS = Public Health Service
- NIH = National Institutes of Health
- BMS = Bureau of Medical Services
- OSG = Office of the Surgeon General
- BSS/CH = Bureau of State Services, Community Health divisions
- BSS/EH = Bureau of State Services, Environmental Health divisions
- HSMHA = Health Services and Mental Health Administration
- CPEHS = Consumer Protection and Environmental Health Service
- CPEHS/ECA = Consumer Protection and Environmental Health Service, Environmental Control Administration
- ADAMHA = Alcohol, Drug Abuse, and Mental Health Administration
- HRA = Health Resources Administration
- HSA = Health Services Administration
- CDC = Center for Disease Control
- FDA = Food and Drug Administration
- EPA = Environmental Protection Agency
