= Justin M. Andrews =

American public health administrator and parasitologist (1902 - 1967)

Justin Meredith Andrews
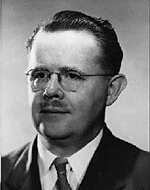

Director of the Centers for Disease Control and Prevention
- In office 1952–1953
- President: Harry Truman
- Preceded by: Raymond A. Vonderlehr
- Succeeded by: Theodore J. Bauer

2nd Director of the National Institute of Allergy and Infectious Diseases
- In office 1957–1964
- President: Dwight D. Eisenhower; John F. Kennedy; Lyndon B. Johnson
- Preceded by: Victor H. Haas
- Succeeded by: Dorland J. Davis

Personal details
- Born: Justin Meredith Andrews; August 28, 1902 Providence, Rhode Island, U.S.
- Died: June 29, 1967 (aged 64) Largo, Florida, U.S.
- Education: Brown University (PhB); Johns Hopkins University (ScD)

Justin Meredith Andrews (August 28, 1902 – June 29, 1967) was an American public health administrator and parasitologist, specialising in malaria.

== Early life and family ==
Andrews was born in Providence, Rhode Island, on August 28, 1902, the son of Clarke Willett Andrews (1872–1907), who worked with the New England Telephone Company, and his wife Annie Frances, née Bliven (b. 1878). The family descended from John MacAndrews, who settled in North Kingstown in 1671. Andrews married twice: firstly in 1927 to Arline Sylvia, daughter of Henry and Hattie Anderson; and secondly in 1957 to Jean Simonne, daughter of Harry W. and Elaine Grant. With his first wife, he had two sons, Donald and Theodore; his second marriage gave him a step-son, Richard Grant.

== Career ==
=== Academic ===
After graduating from Brown University with a PhB degree in 1923, Andrews attended the School of Hygiene and Public Health at Johns Hopkins University, which awarded him the ScD degree in 1926. He was an instructor there for a year, before becoming an Associate in Protozoology in 1927; he was then promoted to be Associate Professor of Protozoology four years later. In 1929, he had also worked on the Rockefeller Foundation's Malaria Survey in the British West Indies. Throughout his time at Johns Hopkins, Andrews's research focused on malaria and a range of other parasitic, tropical diseases.

=== Public health administrator ===
In 1938, he was appointed Director of the Division of Malaria and Hookworm Service at the Georgia Department of Public Health. He served there until 1942. During World War II, he served with the Sanitary Corps; he was the official malariologist to American forces in the North African (1943–44) and Pacific (1945) theatres and ended the war a colonel.

He continued working for the US government as an officer in the US Public Health Service, assigned to what became the Communicable Disease Center (now the Centers for Disease Control and Prevention). He was Deputy Officer in Charge there from 1946 to 1951, and served as Officer in Charge from 1952 to 1953. As one obituary noted, it was during this time that "He was one of the principal framers and executors of the plan to eradicate malaria from the United States" – the National Malaria Eradication Program.

After leaving the CDC, he became Assistant Surgeon General of the Public Health Service and Associate Chief for Program in the Bureau of State Services. He then moved to the National Institutes of Health, where he was Director of the National Institute of Allergy and Infectious Diseases (1957–64); during his leadership, the institute created the Middle America Research Unit.

== Later life and assessment ==
Andrews retired in 1964 and died on June 29, 1967, at Largo in Florida. Martin D. Young, writing in The Journal of Parasitology, called him "an internationally known parasitologist, a distinguished teacher, author, and public health administrator". His death was reported in The New York Times, which described him as "an authority on malaria". He published over 100 articles in scientific journals, was President of the American Society of Parasitologists, the National Malaria Society and the American Society of Tropical Medicine and Hygiene.

In his lifetime, Andrews received numerous honors. He was a Fellow of the American Association for the Advancement of Science among several other national organisations, and received several awards for his work: the Legion of Merit for his wartime work (1944), the Joseph Augustin Le Prince Award from the American Society of Tropical Medicine and Hygiene (1960), and the Public Health Service Meritorious Service Medal (1964). Johns Hopkins awarded him an honorary doctorate in 1951 and Brown University, his alma mater, gave him its Bicentennial Medal in 1965.
