= Theodore J. Bauer =

American physician (1909–2005)

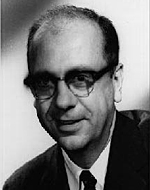

Chief of the Communicable Disease Center
- In office 1953–1956
- President: Dwight D. Eisenhower
- Preceded by: Justin M. Andrews
- Succeeded by: Robert J. Anderson

Personal details
- Born: November 18, 1909 Iowa City, Iowa, U.S.
- Died: May 6, 2005 (aged 95) Wyckoff, New Jersey, U.S.
- Spouse: Helen (m. 1939)
- Children: 4
- Education: University of Iowa (BS, MD)
- Occupation: Infectious disease specialist, physician

Theodore J. Bauer (November 18, 1909 – May 6, 2005) was an American Infectious disease specialist who was head of the Communicable Disease Center (now known as the Centers for Disease Control and Prevention) from 1953 to 1956, and who also served as Assistant Surgeon General of the United States.

== Career ==
Bauer was born November 18, 1909, in Iowa City, Iowa. Despite his family having lost both its broom factory and farm during the Great Depression, Bauer was able to work his way through school to earn both his B.S. (1934) and M.D. (1933) degrees from the University of Iowa. Upon graduating from the University of Iowa Medical School, Bauer took internships and residencies in Chicago and New York City, furthering his interest in public health epidemiology.

Bauer's first major act in his career in the United States Public Health Service was the establishment of a Venereal Disease Center in Chicago in 1942. He went on to serve as chief of the Division of Venereal Disease in Washington, D.C., from 1948 to 1953, and then as medical officer in charge of the Communicable Disease Center (now known as the Centers for Disease Control and Prevention) in Atlanta, Georgia, from 1953 to 1956. Bauer also served on numerous expert committees for the World Health Organization between 1948 and 1957.

Finally, Bauer was chief of the Bureau of State Services in the U.S. Public Health Service in Washington, D.C., from 1960 to 1962. In 1962, he was awarded the Public Health Service Distinguished Service Medal upon his retirement after 29 years of service, having achieved the rank of Assistant Surgeon General of the United States.

In 1962, Bauer went to work for Becton Dickinson and Company, where he was senior vice president for research and medical affairs until 1975. Bauer also served on Becton Dickinson's board of directors from 1965 to 1985. Additionally, Bauer served on numerous expert committees for the American Medical Association, the Wyckoff Board of Health, the planning board for Hackensack University Medical Center, and the New Jersey Governor's Health Care Administration Board.

== Personal life ==
Bauer married his wife, Helen, in 1939. They had four children.

Bauer died at his home in Wyckoff, New Jersey, on May 6, 2005, of congestive heart failure.

== Publications ==
Bauer published more than 50 scientific articles on infectious diseases and chronic disease control, and was editor of the Journal of Venereal Disease Information from 1948 to 1952. He published his memoirs in 2001, entitled Disease Finder From The Midwest.

== Selected awards ==
Bauer received the United States Public Health Service Distinguished Service Medal in 1962. He received the University of Iowa Distinguished Alumni Award in 1997. In 2002, he was inducted into the Immaculate Heart Academy Hall of Fame.

== Legacy ==
He was survived by three children, nine grandchildren, and seven great grandchildren. Both Bauer and his wife were life members of the University of Iowa Alumni Association and members of the University of Iowa Foundation's Presidents Club. Bauer was a parishioner of the Church of St. Elizabeth of Hungary (Wyckoff, New Jersey) and a member of the High Mountain Golf Club (Franklin Lakes, New Jersey).
