= Victor H. Haas =

American physician and immunologist

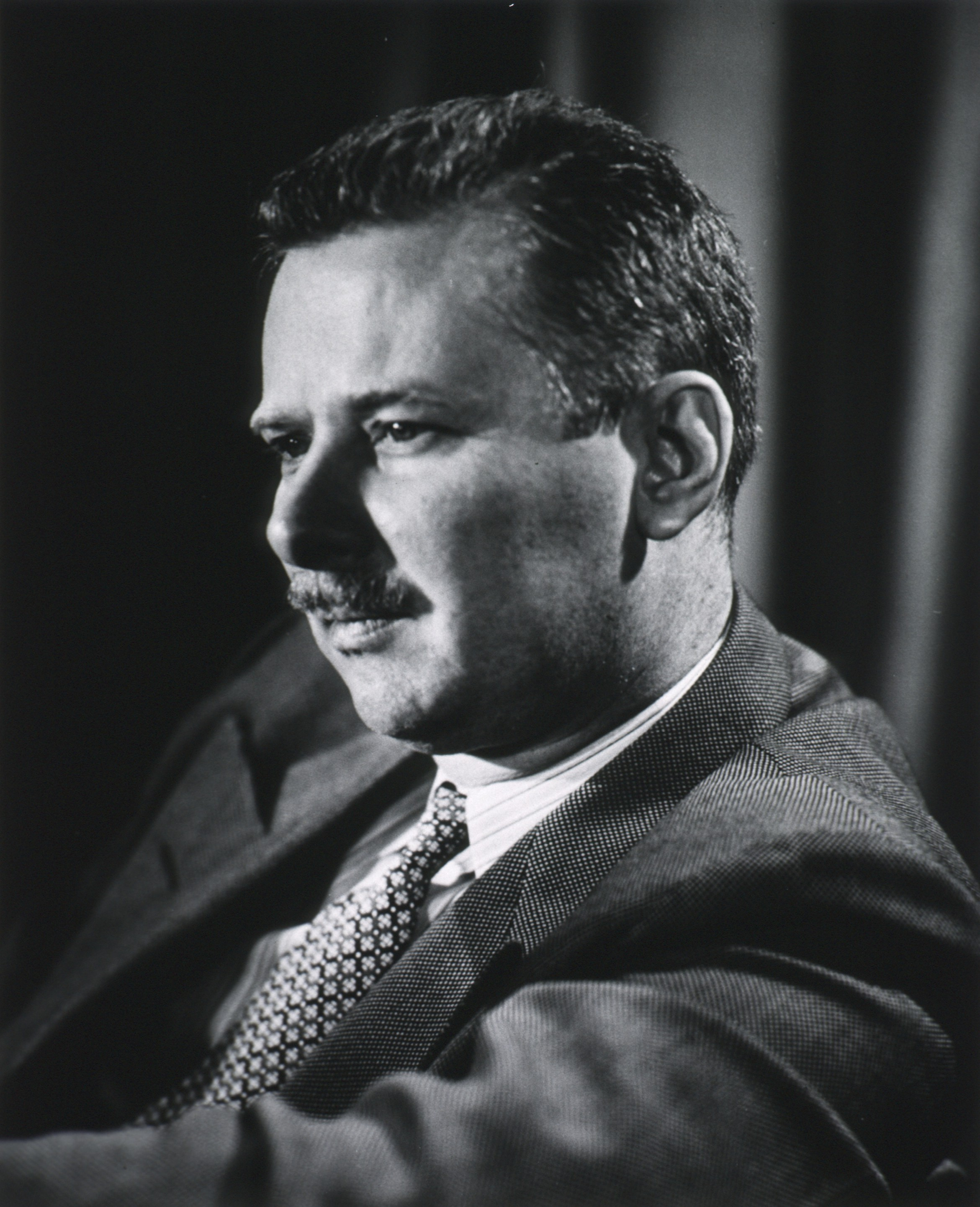

1st Director of the National Institute of Allergy and Infectious Diseases
- In office 1948–1957
- President: Harry S. Truman; Dwight D. Eisenhower
- Succeeded by: Justin M. Andrews

Personal details
- Born: Victor H. Haas; February 5, 1916 Belle Plaine, Minnesota, US
- Died: June 8, 1983 (aged 72) Minneapolis, Minnesota, US
- Spouse: Elise M. Haas
- Children: Gary Haas
- Education: University of Cincinnati (BS, BM, MD)
- Scientific career
- Fields: Epidemiology
- Institutions: US Public Health Service; National Institute of Allergy and Infectious Diseases

Victor Herman Frank Haas (February 5, 1916 – June 8, 1983) was an American physician, commissioned officer in the U.S. Public Health Service (PHS). He was the first director of the recently merged National Institute of Allergy and Infectious Diseases (NIAID) from 1964 to 1975.

== Early life and education ==
Haas was born in Belle Plaine, Minnesota, on February 5, 1916, spending most of his early years in Cincinnati. Davis received a BS(1929), BM(1931), and MD(1932) degrees from the University of Cincinnati.

== Career ==
After joining the Commissioned Corps of the U.S. Public Health Service (PHS) in 1932, he conducted investigations of encephalitis in St. Louis, Missouri, in 1933. Haas spent the following year at the National Institute of Health, and from 1935 to 1939 served at the PHS Plague Laboratory in San Francisco.

During World War II, Haas was chief of the Medical Commission to the Yunnan-Burma Railway in China and staff officer in the China-Burma-India Theater. He was the officer in charge of PHS malaria investigations from 1943 to 1948.

Haas was selected by Surgeon General Leonard A. Scheele, to be the first director of the National Microbiological Institute (NMI), Haas established programs to fund research conducted by scientists outside NIH and to support young investigators through training and fellowship grants.

During this period, scientists developing diphtheria and tetanus antisera observed that some patients exhibited severe hypersensitivity reactions to horse serum injections. This evidence of an immune system gone awry signaled that the Institute should include basic studies of the immune system in its future plans. To acknowledge the NMI expanded mission, it was renamed the National Institute of Allergy and Infectious Diseases (NIAID) in 1955. Haas was NIAID director until he retired from the PHS on January 1, 1961.

== Personal life ==
He died June 8, 1983, at Waconia, Minnesota.
