= National Practitioner Data Bank =

Medical database in United States

The National Practitioner Data Bank (NPDB) is a database operated by the U.S. Department of Health and Human Services that contains medical malpractice payment and adverse action reports on health care professionals. Hospitals and state licensing boards submit information on physicians and other health care practitioners, including clinical privileges restrictions, actions against physicians' licenses, and medical malpractice payments that is kept in the NPDB database. Only authorized users (e.g. hospitals and state licensing boards considering a physician's application for hospital privileges or a state medical license) are permitted by statute to "query" this information in the NPDB.

The NPDB was created by Congress with the primary goals of improving health care quality, protecting the public and reducing health care fraud and abuse. The NPDB is managed by the Bureau of Health Workforce of the Health Resources and Services Administration in the U.S. Department of Health and Human Services. Before May 6, 2013, the Data Bank comprised the National Practitioner Data Bank and the Healthcare Integrity and Protection Data Bank. The two were consolidated by Section 6403 of the Affordable Care Act of 2010, Public Law 111–148.

In enacting, the National Practitioner Data Bank-enabling legislation, the Health Care Quality Improvement Act of 1986, Congress intended for physicians to receive "full due process rights with notice and representation". (Statement of HCQIA lead sponsor Ron Wyden)

== Information Collected ==
- Medical malpractice payments,
- Any adverse licensure actions or loss of license
- Adverse clinical privileging actions, or Adverse professional society membership actions
- Any negative action or finding by a State licensing or certification authority
- Private accreditation organization negative actions or findings against a health care practitioner or entity

Any negative action or finding by a Federal or State licensing and certification agency that is publicly available information
Civil judgments or criminal convictions that are health care-related

- Exclusions from Federal or State health care programs
- Other adjudicated actions or decisions (formal or official actions, involving a due process mechanism and based on acts or omissions that affect or could affect the payment, provision, or delivery of a health care item or service)

== Access ==
Access to the information is limited, and is not available to the general public. It is provided to hospitals, other health care entities, professional societies, state and federal licensing and certification authorities (including Medical and Dental Boards), and agencies or contractors administering Federal or State health care programs.

In addition, individual healthcare providers can obtain access to their own records; this information is also in some cases available to those who may be suing them. Researchers may also obtain statistical data, but not data on individuals.

=== Anonymized data ===
Public access is available which contains no identifying information. In 2011, this access was removed after someone was able to identify a doctor in the database, but it was restored thereafter.
