= Yunnan–Burma railway =

Railway line in China

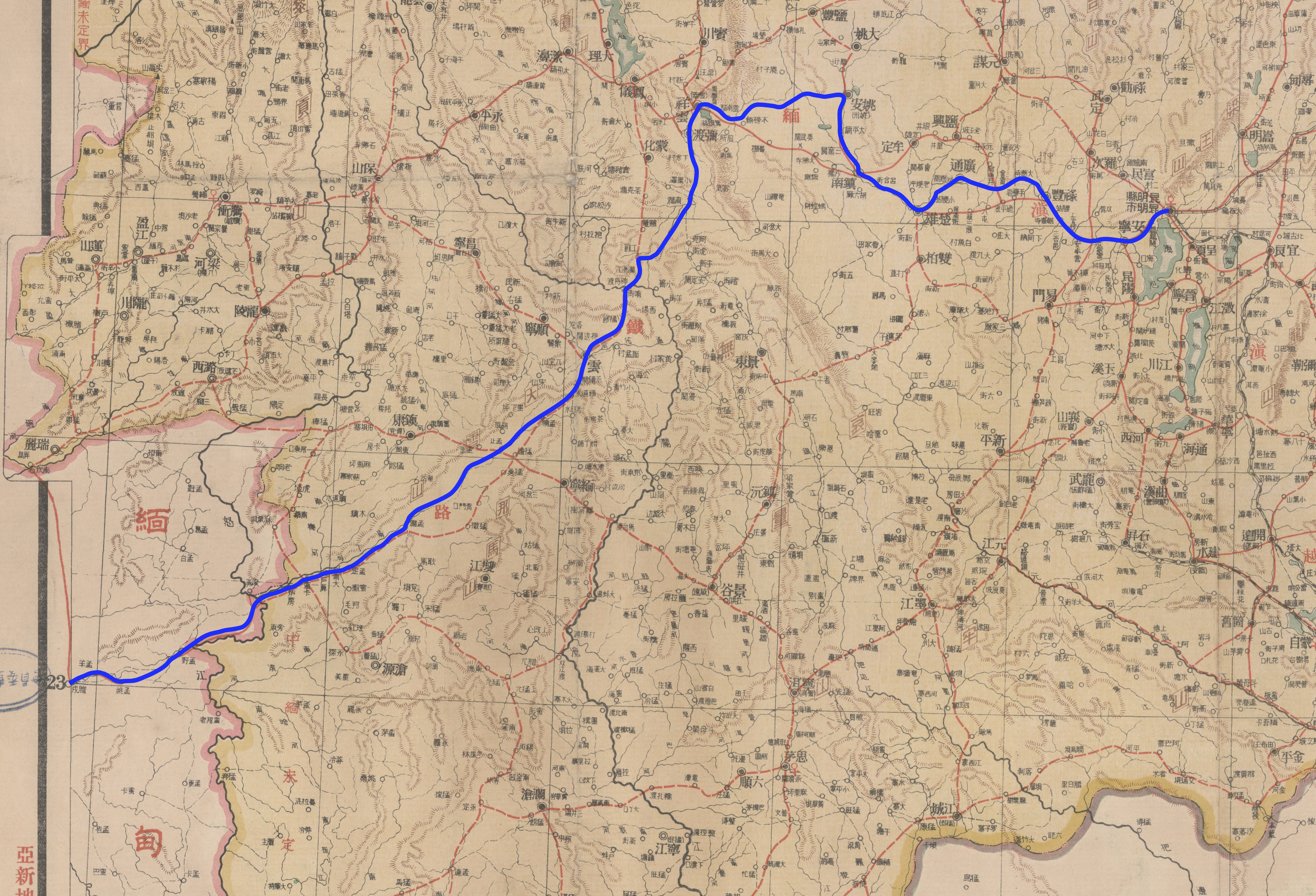
Yunnan–Burma railway in a 1939 map (the blue line)

The Yunnan–Burma railway (alternatively: Burma–Yunnan railway) was a failed British project to connect far southwest China's Yunnan province with the recently established rail network in British-ruled Burma.

== History and politics ==
The British project was working against the background of the successful French Kunming-Haiphong railway that had been established on the nearby Hanoi to Kunming route from 1904–1910, some 30 years earlier. To secure the rights to construction, Britain referred to Article IV of the Anglo-French Siam Convention for 'mutual privileges'.

== Planning and surveying ==
Maria Bugrova's article The British expeditions to China in XIX century discusses the question of a railway to Yunnan from Burma.

In the 1880s, Great Britain drew special attention to the Upper Burma region and the roads to southwestern China. The former colonial officer of British Burma's administration, A.R. Colquhoun, and an engineer of the Civil Works Department in India, H. Hallett, traveled in 1882 from Canton to Rangoon. A.R Colquhoun returned to England and sent his proposal to the Chamber of Commerce of Great Britain to investigate the question of building a railway between Rangoon and southwestern China through the Shan states. His proposal was approved by the Chamber. According to a preliminary calculation, the cost of work was about seven thousand pound sterling. One half of this amount had to be presented by the Chambers of Commerce, and another part had to be contributed by the Government.

By the end of 1884, Hallett and Colquhoun received 3,500 pounds from the Chamber of Commerce for the investigation of building a railway. They found important information about climate, population and minerals. They drew special attention to liking. From their point of view, penetration of British goods into China depended on the amount of this tax. The difficulty of liking question substantially explained the British traders' interest in building a railway. In case of this building it would be possible to avoid the payment of liking transferring goods to the interior of China. Colquhoun telegraphed daily to The Times about the expedition.

There are references in the 1898 British Hansard regarding possible construction of the line.

Archibald John Little's 1905 book The Far East mentioned the proposed route on page 124:

A railway, starting from Mandalay, goes north-east to the bank of the Salwin which is to be crossed at Kunlong Ferry in latitude 23 degrees 20', whence, if ever built, it is to be taken north in Chinese territory and run parallel with the prevailing strike of the mountains, due north to Tali-fu; but this line will pass through a wild thinly-peopled country and it is doubtful if a private company will be found to build it.

In 1911, Leo Borgholz, the US Consul General in Canton, published a trade report entitled 'Yunnan Trade Districts and Routes', in which he mentions that the British appeared to have shelved the project for lack of financial viability.

In 1938, Edward Michael Law-Yone travelled to Yunnan from his native Burma to see the proposed route.

== Construction ==
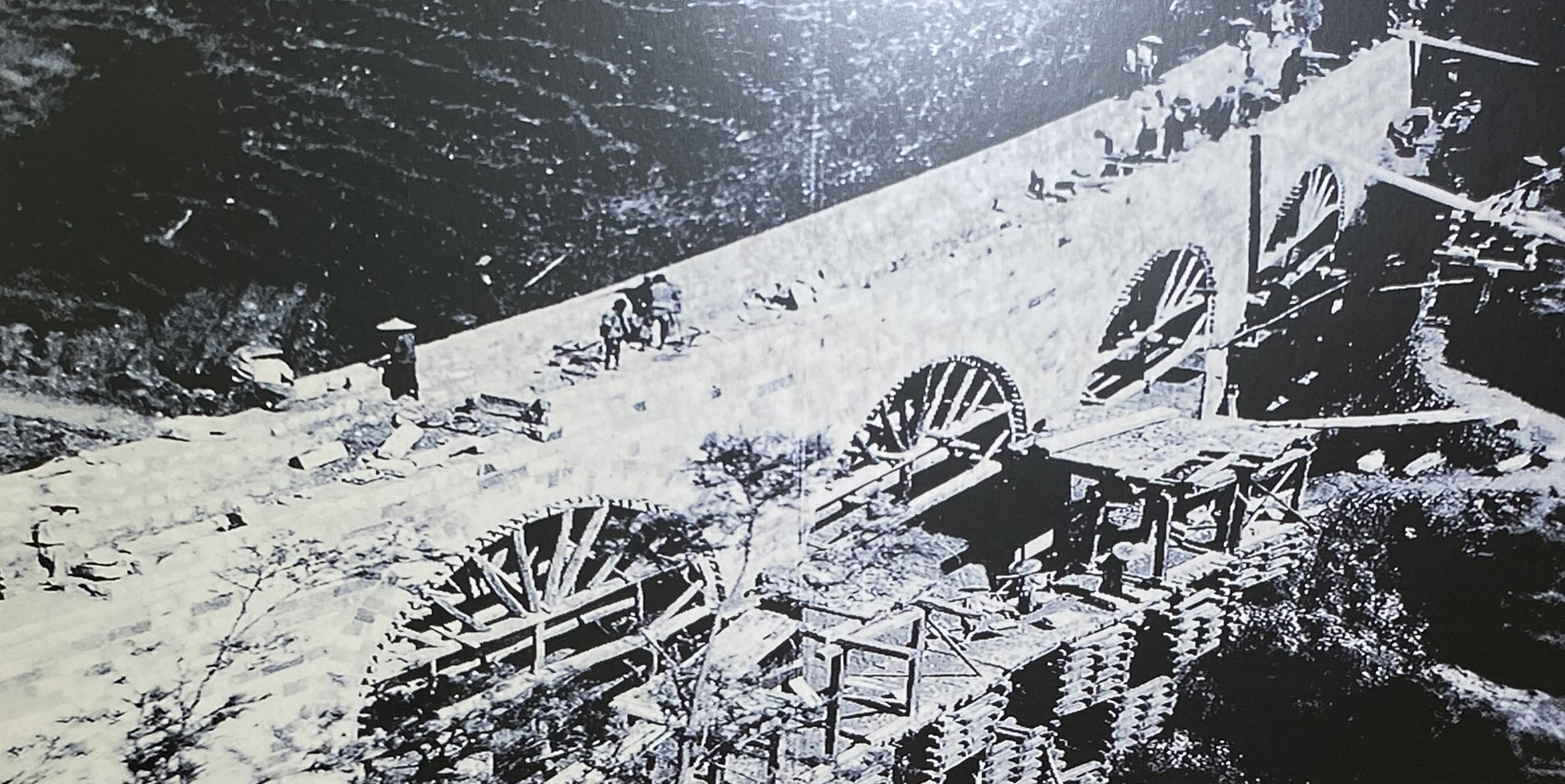
Taocun Village Bridge under constructing

By 1938 construction had begun. In 1941 25 1,000 mm (3 ft 3 3/8 in) meter gauge 2-8-8-2 mallet-type articulated engines were ordered from the American ALCO company, and American promised to supply steel for the construction effort.

In 1939 it was proposed to construct the western section of the Yunnan–Burma railway using a gauge of 15 1/4 in (387 mm), since such minimum gauge facilitates the tightest of curves in difficult terrain.

In July 1940, under pressure from Japan, the British closed the Burma Road temporarily to the transit of arms, ammunition, gasoline, trucks and railroad supplies.

An article by Royal Arch Gunnison published in the San Francisco Chronicle on Thursday, November 27, 1941 stated that American Engineers still expected "12 to 15 months to complete" the railway and described a Dr. Victor Haas of the United States Public Health Service as in charge of sanitation and malaria prevention.

Additional American personnel such as Paul Stevenson and Victor H. Haas accepted commissions with the United States Public Health Service and were sent to assist with malaria control during the construction effort.

== Abandonment ==
Construction of the line was abandoned due to Japanese advances to Lashio in May 1942. As Japanese advanced towards Yunnan the Chinese army implemented a Scorched Earth policy and dynamited rail and bridges to prevent enemy advances.

When Japan overran Burma and the west of Yunnan in 1942, China had to destroy the finished section of railway lest Japanese troops would capitalize on it. (China’s Look South: China-Myanmar Transport Corridor, Hongwei Fan, Institute of International Relations and Area Studies, Ritsumeikan University)

In 1943 fighting occurred between Japanese and Chinese forces aided by US Air Support along the Yunnan-Burma railway:

CHINESE DRIVE JAPS BACK IN YUNNAN BATTLE CHUNGKING, (Yuma Sun, March 6 1943) A big Chinese counteroffensive along the Salween river in western Yunnan province has driven the Japanese hack several miles toward the Burma border, the Central News Agency reported today. The counteroffensive has been under way for a week and has resulted in recapture of many points, including Manyunkai, Pangwachai and Tassutse, it was said. The Chinese retook the town of Mongtmg and enemy troops in that area were retreating toward Kunlong, just over the border in Burma. Japanese units were reported fleeing westward from the Salween and along the Lashio-Kunming railway.

Construction was never resumed on the western section. Burma's limited trading value to China and its internal political and military instability have probably been two major contributing factors. In 1958 tracks were laid on the eastern section roadbed from Shizui to Yipinglang. In 1970, the Line was gradually dismantled. Only the 12.4-kilometer line from Kunming North Station to Shizui remained until 2017.

== Legacy ==
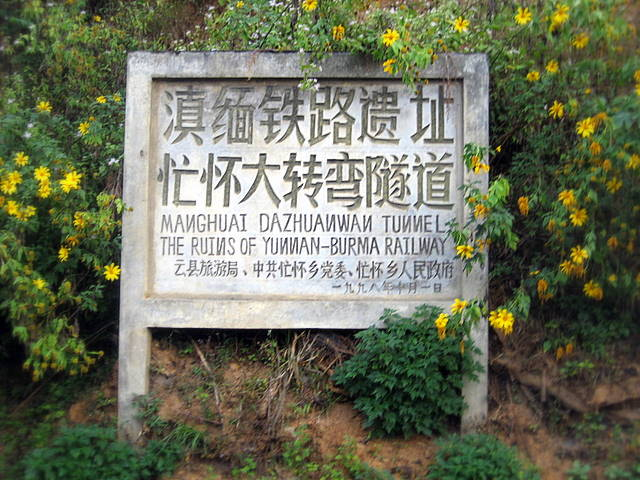
Commemorative sign at the site of the Manzhuan Tunnel.

In 1959, the Kunming-Yipinglang line (昆一铁路, meter gauge railway) was opened using the remains of the Yunnan-Burma railway; since the opening of the parallel Chengdu-Kunming railway in 1970, this line has been progressively shortened.

Today the Yunnan side of the line lies in ruin. Though signs here and there attest to its presence, there is little actual rail left, and the line has all but vanished from local history and barely graces itineraries of all but the most determined travellers.

One such sign can be glimpsed opposite the ferry to Baodian, slightly south of Manwan in the far north-eastern section of Lincang prefecture. The sign records a tunnel from the construction, but the entry has long been covered over and there is no visual hint to the line's presence whatsoever.

== See also ==
- The Burma – Yunnan railway. Chandran, J. Papers in International Southeast Asia Series #21. Ohio University Center for International Studies, Southeast Asian Program, 1971.
- Joseph Warren Stilwell Papers. Box/Folder: 27:15, 33:47. (online reference)
- Yunnan–Vietnam railway
- Burma Road
- Dali–Ruili railway, a modern railway project intended to bring a railway close to the Burmese border
- Dali-Lincang railway, a modern railway line under construction that links cities along the old Yunna-Burma railway route.,,,
