= Healthcare Systems Bureau =

U.S. government health administration organization

The Healthcare Systems Bureau is part of the U.S. Health Resources and Services Administration (HRSA) in the Department of Health and Human Services. The bureau oversees the nation's organ and tissue donation and transplantation systems, poison control and vaccine injury compensation programs, and a drug discount program for certain safety-net health care providers.

== Programs ==
=== Transplantation ===
HRSA oversees the Organ Procurement and Transplantation Network and the Scientific Registry of Transplant Recipients in addition to promoting national awareness of the critical need for organ and tissue donation. HRSA also provides staff and logistics support to the Advisory Committee on Organ Transplantation, which makes recommendations to the Secretary of the U.S. Department of Health and Human Services on issues concerning organ donation and transplantation.

In FY 2008, HRSA provided $23 million to promote the donation of organs and tissues and improve national procurement, allocation and transplantation activities. Nearly 100,000 Americans are on organ transplant waiting lists, and about 28,000 transplant procedures are performed annually. On average, 77 patients undergo transplant surgeries each day, and 19 die for lack of donated organs.

Under the C.W. Bill Young Cell Transplantation Program and National Cord Blood Inventory, HRSA helps make possible blood stem cell transplants for patients with life-threatening blood disorders who lack a related donor. Stem cells for transplant come from adult volunteer donors and umbilical cord blood units donated to public cord blood banks. The program recruits adult volunteer donors, helps member cord blood banks collect and list additional units, and supports research to improve the results of unrelated donor transplants.

=== Poison Control Program ===
HRSA awards grants to the nation's 61 poison control centers and manages the national toll-free poison help line, 1-800-222-1222.

HRSA funds the improvement and stabilization of poison control centers across the United States, ensuring that the more than 2.4 million poison exposures reported each year to the nation's poison control centers are treated over the phone with guidance from Poison Control Centers' trained health care professionals.

=== 340B Drug Pricing Program ===
HRSA's 340B Program lets health centers, HIV/AIDS clinics and operators of certain other federal safety-net programs buy outpatient drugs at significant discounts. It is applicable to hospitals (mixed-use and outpatient clinics) and contract pharmacies. The 340B Program is often managed by software for maximizing the savings and for providing compliance. 340BSoftware.com is an example of such software. The Program is a federal program. The 340B Drug Pricing Program is administered by the Office of Pharmacy Affairs.

The program resulted from enactment of the Veterans Health Care Act of 1992 (Pub. L. 102–585), which is codified as Section 340B of the Public Health Service Act. Section 340B limits the cost of covered outpatient drugs to more than 18,000 eligible entities including ten types of health care providers and programs funded by HRSA and hospitals that provide care to high volumes of patients that are either indigent or located in remote areas. These hospitals include disproportionate share hospitals, children's hospitals, sole community hospitals, rural referral centers, critical access hospitals, and cancer hospitals exempt from the Medicare prospective payment system.

As reported in the Department of Health and Human Services 2014 Justification of Estimates for Appropriations Committees, the 340B program cuts drug costs for participants, saving them an estimated $6 billion in discounted prescription drugs. These savings enable them to purchase the drugs for a price that is "at least 23.1 percent below the average manufacturer price (AMP) for brand name drugs, 13 percent below AMP for generic drugs; and 17.1 percent below AMP for clotting and pediatric drugs". These savings enable participants to provide more direct health care services to underserved populations. In recent years the program has seen a 3-4% annual growth rate.

Pharmaceuticals purchased at 340B pricing account for 2% of drugs purchased in the U.S. annually.

=== Hill-Burton Program ===
The Hill-Burton Program requires 200 obligated health care facilities to provide free or reduced cost health care to patients who are uninsured, unable to pay, and unqualified for Medicaid coverage. In exchange for such services, the program previously funded grants and loans for new construction and improvements to 6,800 facilities nationwide. But most of those locations have discharged their obligations and no longer are in the program. Since 1980, almost $6 billion in uncompensated Hill-Burton services have been provided.

=== Healthcare and other facilities ===
In FY 2008, HRSA monitored 940 projects worth $691 million for health care and health-related facilities to meet their design, construction and equipment needs. Congress designates each of the awardees on an individual basis.

=== Compensation programs ===
==== National Vaccine Injury Compensation Program (VICP) ====
Most people who get vaccines have no serious problems. However, vaccines, like any medicines, can cause serious problems — such as severe allergic reactions — on certain rare occasions. In those cases, the National Vaccine Injury Compensation Program provides compensation to people who are found to be injured or killed by certain vaccines, or who have experienced certain medical events within a certain time of receiving such vaccines, irrespective of proof of causation.

Since 1988, more than 2,200 families and individuals thought to have been injured by certain vaccines have been awarded over $1.8 billion through the National Vaccine Injury Compensation Program. The program seeks to encourage immunizations by assuring those few patients who experience side effects that they will be compensated.

==== Countermeasures Injury Compensation Program ====
Established by PREP Act, in the case of pandemic, epidemic, or other major security threat requiring a medical countermeasure, the CICP provides compensation to eligible individuals for serious physical injuries or death. Examples include:

- COVID-19
- Marburg
- nerve agents and certain insecticides (organophosphorus and/or carbamate)
- 2009 A/H1N1 pandemic
- Zika
- Ebola
- smallpox
- anthrax
- botulism
- acute radiation syndrome and sequela

== History ==
The Healthcare Systems Bureau ultimately traces back to four divisions of the U.S. Public Health Service (PHS) created in the late 1940s as part of the creation of its Bureau of State Services (BSS) and Bureau of Medical Services (BMS) units.

Within BSS, the Division of Public Health Education and Division of State Grants were created in 1949. In 1954, these were merged into the Division of General Health Services, which became the Division of Community Health Practice around 1960. During the PHS reorganizations of 1966–1973, it was renamed the Community Health Service.

Separately, the Division of Hospital Facilities was formed in BSS in 1946, and the Division of Health Facilities Construction was established in BMS in 1947. In 1955, these merged to form the Division of Hospital and Medical Facilities in BMS. During the PHS reorganizations of 1966–1973, it was renamed the Health Facilities Planning and Construction Service. This division's function was to fund construction of hospitals by the states through the Hill–Burton Act, and research into effective utilization of hospital facilities.

At the end of the reorganizations in 1973, these were merged into the Bureau of Health Resources Development within the new Health Resources Administration. It became the Office of Special Programs in 1997, and the Healthcare Systems Bureau in 2004.
