= Bureau of State Services =

Former U.S. federal government agency

Agency overview
- Formed: December 30, 1943; 82 years ago
- Preceding agency: Divisions of States Relations, Industrial Hygiene, and Venereal Disease
- Dissolved: December 31, 1966; 59 years ago
- Superseding agency: several, see PHS reorganizations of 1966–1973
- Jurisdiction: Federal government of the United States
- Headquarters: Washington, D.C.
- Parent agency: U.S. Public Health Service

The Bureau of State Services (BSS) was one of three principal operating agencies of the United States Public Health Service (PHS) from 1943 until 1966. The bureau contained the PHS divisions that administered cooperative services to U.S. states through technical and financial assistance, and included significant programs in community health, environmental health, and workforce development.

The Bureau was broken up at the beginning of the Public Health Service reorganizations of 1966–1973. The community health and workforce development divisions were eventually merged respectively into two divisions of the Health Resources and Services Administration, with the exception of the division that became the Centers for Disease Control and Prevention (CDC). Most of the Bureau's environmental health divisions became the core of the Environmental Protection Agency when it was created in 1971, with the remaining two divisions becoming the National Institute for Occupational Safety and Health within CDC, and the FDA Center for Devices and Radiological Health.

== Formation ==
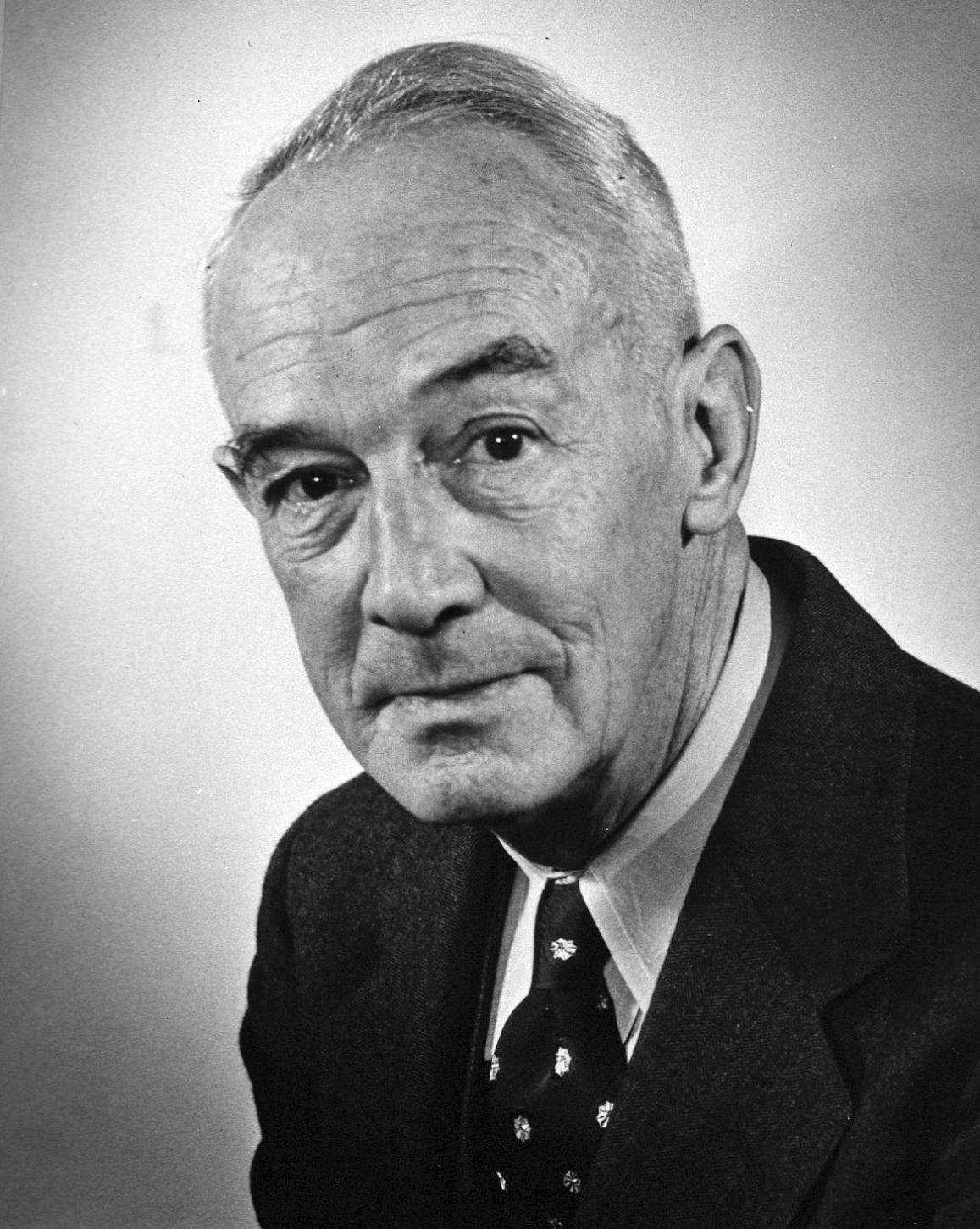
Lewis Ryers Thompson was the first Chief of the Bureau of State Services. He had previously been Chief of the Office of Industrial Hygiene and Sanitation, and then Director of the National Institute of Health.

The Marine Hospital Service, the predecessor of the U.S. Public Health Service (PHS), formed its first internal divisions in 1899. By 1943, PHS contained eight administrative divisions, plus the National Cancer Institute, St. Elizabeths Hospital, and Freedmen's Hospital under the direct supervision of the Surgeon General. These divisions often had overlapping scopes, which was seen as administratively unwieldy. Additionally, some of these had been created and specified through several pieces of legislation that were inconsistent in their scope, while some had been created internally by PHS or delegated from its parent agency, the Federal Security Agency.

A 1943 law (57 Stat. 587) collected PHS's divisions into three operating agencies. These were the National Institute of Health for laboratory research, the Bureau of Medical Services for direct patient care through hospitals and clinics, and the Bureau of State Services for administering cooperative services to U.S. states through technical and financial assistance.

BSS was largely the successor to the Division of States Relations, which had grown out of the Domestic Quarantine Division, one of the original 1899 divisions. The Division of States Relations became part of BSS upon its creation, but was soon split into eleven separate divisions. The other two preexisting divisions incorporated into BSS were the Division of Venereal Disease, and the Division of Industrial Hygiene.

== Functions ==
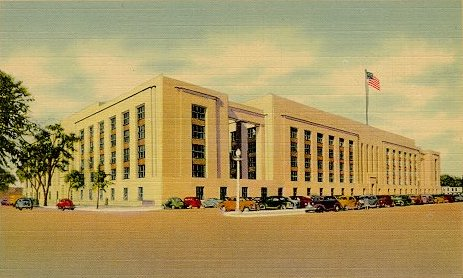
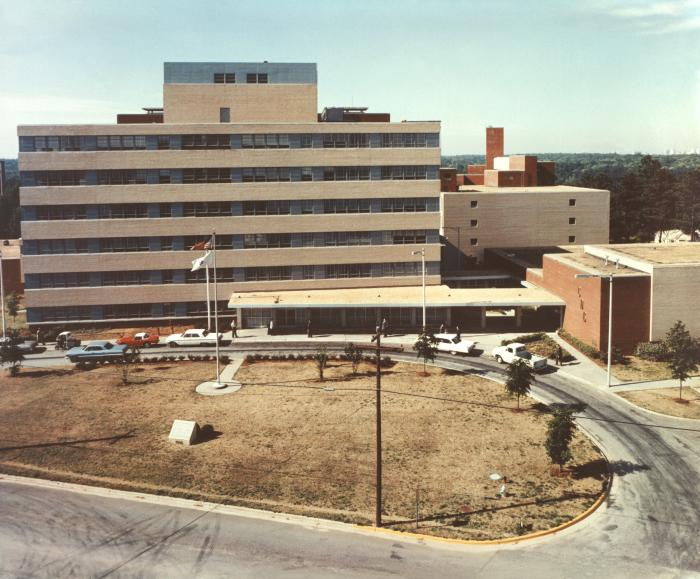
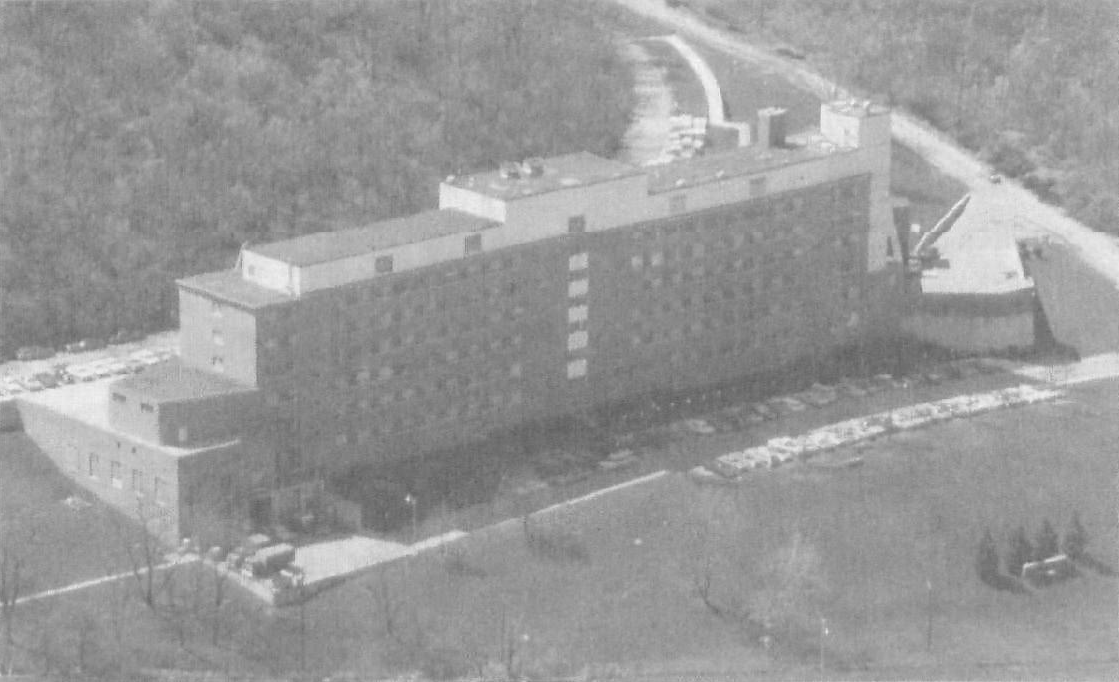
Although the Bureau of State Services was centered in Washington, D.C. (top), it had substantial activities in Atlanta (middle) for infectious disease prevention, and in Cincinnati (bottom) for environmental health.

The name of the bureau implied that its programs would be directed towards cooperation with U.S. states, including both technical expertise and financial grants-in-aid, and its functions were quite diverse.

Its disease prevention activities were focused on public health surveillance, testing and evaluation of preventative and diagnostic measures, development of educational and training materials, and grants to states. The Communicable Disease Center focused on infectious diseases, and was based in Atlanta due to its initial mission of eradicating malaria in the United States. The Division of Chronic Diseases focused on other diseases, mainly cancer, diabetes, arthritis, heart disease, neurological disease, and mental retardation, in addition to aging and nursing homes. The Division of Dental Public Health focused on prevention and treatment of dental diseases. Tuberculosis and venereal diseases originally had their own divisions, but they came to be grouped with the Division of Chronic Diseases in the 1950s, and after 1960 were transferred to the Communicable Disease Center.

BSS's environmental health programs largely arose from Stream Pollution Investigations Station in Cincinnati. It had been created in 1912 and occupied a former U.S. Marine Hospital located in the former Kilgour Mansion. In the late 1940s it expanded into air, industrial, and chemical pollution and radiological health research, and in 1954 it moved to the newly constructed Robert A. Taft Sanitary Engineering Center. The occupational health programs arose from the Office of Industrial Hygiene and Sanitation, which was established in 1914, became the Division of Industrial Hygiene within the National Institute of Health in 1937, and moved into BSS upon its creation in 1943. Its primary functions moved from Bethesda to Cincinnati in 1950.

BSS's workforce development programs were centered in both the Division of Public Health Nursing and the Division of Dental Public Health. These programs sought to assist the training of dentists and nurses through advice, construction and project grants to states, and traineeships. It also provided advice on the planning and administration of health services.

During some of its existence, BSS also had responsibility for funding hospital construction by the states as part of the Hill–Burton Act, Mental Retardation Facilities Construction Act, and Health Professions Educational Assistance Act of 1963. These programs were through the Division of Hospital and Medical Facilities, which was instead part of the Bureau of Medical Services during the 1950s, but was part of BSS before and after this period.

== Organizational development ==
BSS began with the three existing Divisions of States Relation, Industrial Hygiene, and Venereal Disease. As part of the initial organization of the bureau, the Division of States Relations gave rise to eleven new divisions: the Division of Tuberculosis Control in 1944; the Communicable Disease Center and Division of Hospital Facilities in 1946; and the Divisions of Chronic Disease, Dental Public Health, Engineering Resources, Public Health Education, Public Health Nursing, Sanitation, State Grants, and Water Pollution Control in 1949. Also in 1949, the Division of Hospital Facilities was transferred to the Bureau of Medical Services. In 1951, the Division of Chronic Disease and Division of Tuberculosis were consolidated into the Division of Chronic Disease and Tuberculosis.

A major realignment occurred in 1954, with most of the existing divisions being reorganized as programs under a few new divisions:

- The Division of General Health Services absorbed the Divisions of Public Health Nursing, Public Health Education, and State Grants.
- The Division of Special Health Services absorbed the Divisions of Chronic Disease and Tuberculosis, Occupational Health, and Venereal Disease.
- The Division of Sanitary Engineering Services absorbed the Divisions of Engineering Resources, Sanitation, and Water Pollution Control.

The Communicable Disease Center, Division of Dental Public Health, and Division of International Health remained independent as of 1956. The Division of International Health was part of BSS during 1953–1959, but was part of the Office of the Surgeon General before and after this period.

During 1958–61, these changes were largely reversed, with many of the programs reemerging as independent divisions:

- The Division of General Health Services was superseded by Division of Community Health Practice, with the Division of Public Health Nursing becoming independent.
- The Division of Special Health Services was abolished, with its programs promoted into the Divisions of Chronic Disease, Occupational Health, and Accident Prevention.
- The Division of Sanitary Engineering Services was superseded by the Division of Environmental Engineering and Food Protection, with the separate Division of Air Pollution Control and Division of Water Supply and Pollution Control being established. The Division of Radiological Health was also formed during this period.

In addition, the Divisions of Dental Public Health and Public Health Nursing absorbed their corresponding divisions from the Bureau of Medical Services; the Division of Hospital and Medical Facilities was transferred from the Bureau of Medical Services, and the National Center for Health Statistics was created from the old National Office of Vital Statistics. In 1960, these divisions were organized into two units, the Community Health Divisions and Environmental Health Divisions.

In 1966, the Division of Water Supply and Pollution Control was transferred to the Department of the Interior, becoming the Federal Water Pollution Control Administration. In 1967, the Communicable Disease Center took over the Division of Foreign Quarantine from the Bureau of Medical Services.

== Fate ==
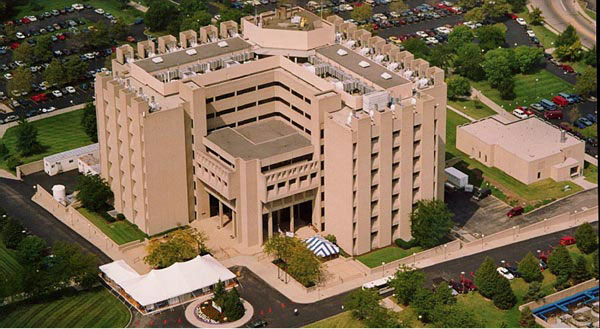
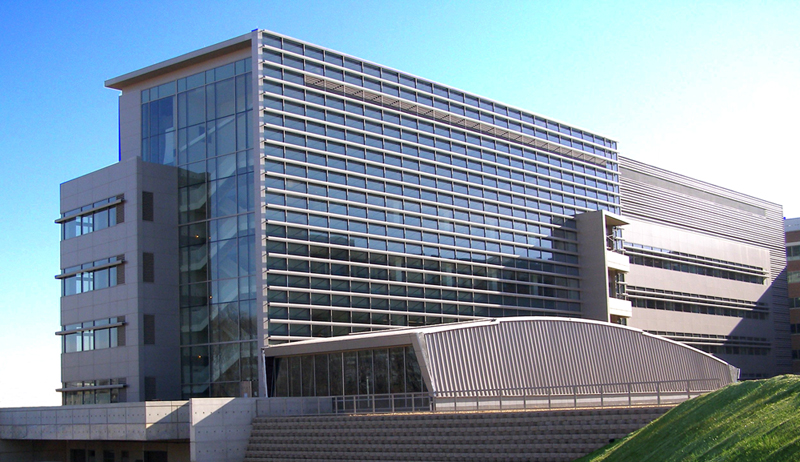
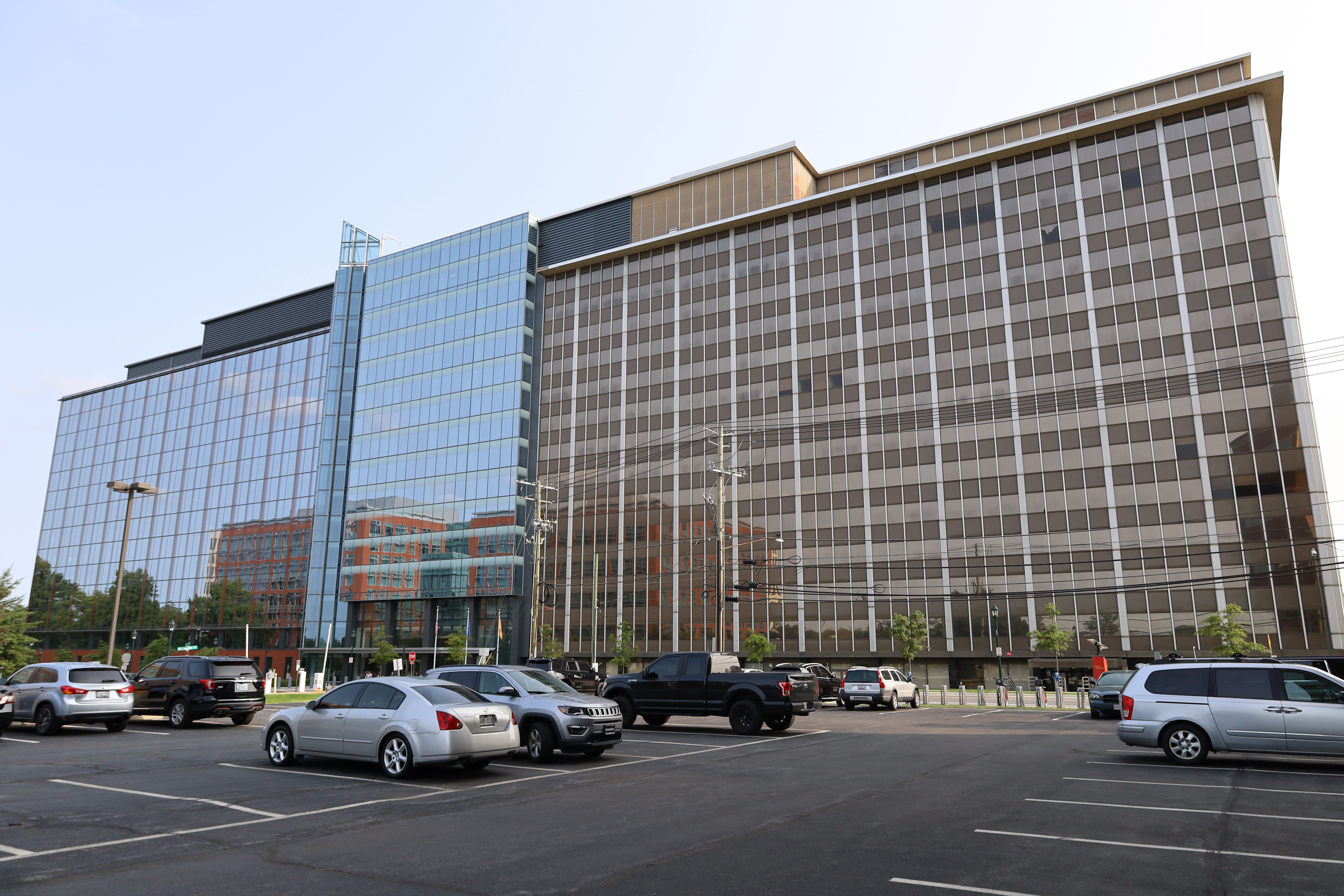
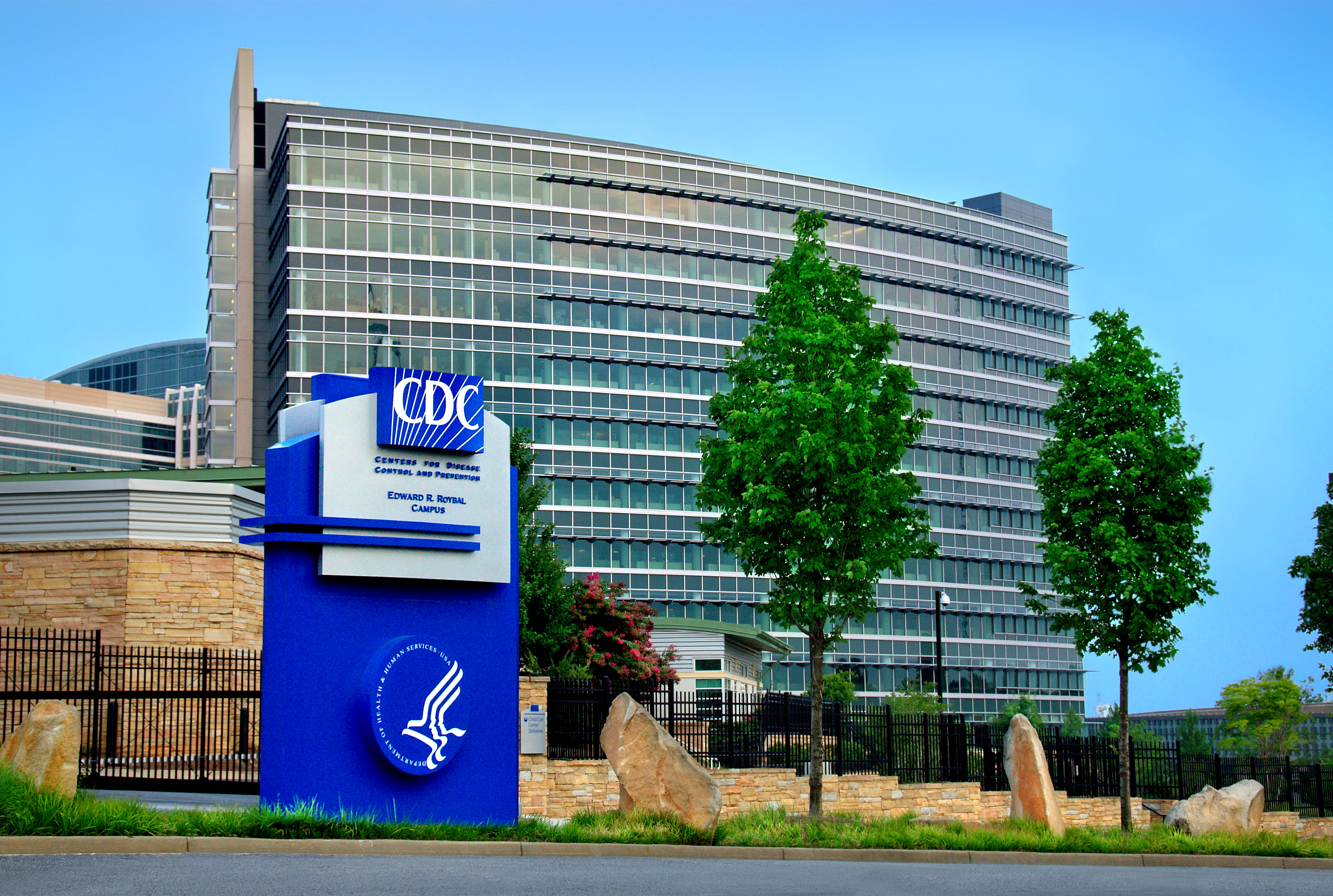
The Bureau of State Service's divisions evolved into the Environmental Protection Agency, FDA Center for Devices and Radiological Health, parts of the Health Resources and Services Administration, and the Centers for Disease Control and Prevention. (modern facilities pictured).

BSS was abolished at the beginning of 1967 in the first of four major reorganizations of PHS. In quick succession, PHS would be reorganized into three new bureaus, and then into two broad operating agencies, which would both be broken up by 1973, giving way to PHS's modern structure.

Most of BSS's Community Health Divisions would join with the Bureau of Medical Services to form the Bureau of Health Services in 1967, and then become part of the Health Services and Mental Health Administration (HSMHA) in 1968. At the same time, BSS's divisions relating to training and professional development became the Bureau of Health Manpower in 1967, which was absorbed by NIH in 1968. After the 1973 breakup of HSMHA, both these bureaus' successors would largely become the modern Healthcare Systems Bureau and Bureau of Health Workforce of the Health Resources and Services Administration, respectively. The only exception was the Center for Disease Control (CDC), which became its own operating agency within PHS.

BSS's Environmental Health Divisions became part of the Bureau of Disease Prevention and Environmental Control in 1967, and then the Consumer Protection and Environmental Health Service (CPEHS) in 1968. Most of the CPEHS divisions would then form the core of the Environmental Protection Agency when it was created in 1971, except for two divisions that would become the National Institute for Occupational Safety and Health within the CDC, and the Center for Devices and Radiological Health within the Food and Drug Administration.

== Chiefs ==
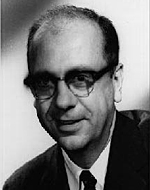
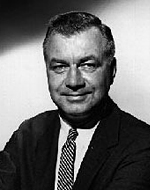
The two BSS Chiefs of the early 1960s, Theodore J. Bauer and Robert J. Anderson, had both previously served as Director of the Communicable Disease Center.

The Chief of the Bureau of State Services was one of the positions holding the title of Assistant Surgeon General.

- Lewis Ryers Thompson (1943–1946)
- Charles L. Williams (1946–1951)
- Joseph Walter Mountin (1951–1952)
- Otis L. Anderson (1952–1957)
- David E. Price (1958–1960)
- Theodore J. Bauer (1960–1962)
- Robert J. Anderson (as of 1963)
- Aaron W. Christensen (by 1965–1966)

== Divisions ==
Division (name as of 1965, link to current successor)	Establishment of earliest predecessor(s)	1954–1960 grouping	1960–1966 grouping	1968–1970 grouping	1973 grouping
Division of Environmental Engineering and Food Protection	1949, as Divisions of Engineering Resources and Sanitation	SES	EH	CPEHS	
Division of Water Supply and Pollution Control	1949	SES	EH	CPEHS	EPA
Division of Air Pollution	<1953, as Community Air Pollution Program	SES/SHS jointly	EH	CPEHS	EPA
Division of Radiological Health	1948, as Radiological Health Unit	SES/SHS jointly	EH	CPEHS	FDA
Division of Occupational Health	1914, as Office of Industrial Hygiene and Sanitation	SHS	EH	CPEHS	CDC
Division of Accident Prevention	1956, as Accident Prevention Program	SHS	CH	abolished	abolished
Division of Chronic Diseases	1949; absorbed Divisions of Venereal Disease (1918) and Tuberculosis Control (1944)	SHS	CH	HSMHA	abolished
Communicable Disease Center	1942, as Office of Malaria Control in War Areas	independent within BSS	CH	HSMHA	independent within PHS
Division of Hospital and Medical Facilities	1946	part of BMS	CH	HSMHA	HRA
Division of Community Health Practice	1949, as Public Health Education and State Grants	GHS	CH	HSMHA	HRA
Division of Nursing	1949	GHS	CH	NIH	HRA
Division of Dental Public Health and Resources	1949	independent within BSS	CH	NIH	HRA

Key:

- SES = Division of Sanitary Engineering Services
- SHS = Division of Special Health Services
- GHS = Division of General Health Services
- EH = Environmental Health divisions
- CH = Community Health divisions
- CPEHS = Consumer Protection and Environmental Health Service
- HSMHA = Health Services and Mental Health Administration
- NIH = National Institutes of Health
- EPA = Environmental Protection Agency
- FDA = Food and Drug Administration
- CDC = Center for Disease Control
- HRA = Health Resources Administration
