= Clarence A. Smith =

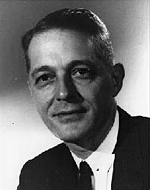

7th Director of the Centers for Disease Control and Prevention
- In office 1960–1962
- President: Dwight D. Eisenhower; John F. Kennedy
- Preceded by: Robert J. Anderson
- Succeeded by: James L. Goddard

Clarence A. Smith was the director of the Centers for Disease Control and Prevention from 1960 to 1962.
