= Public Readiness and Emergency Preparedness Act =

US law

- Long title: Public Readiness and Emergency Preparedness Act
- Acronyms (colloquial): PREPA
- Nicknames: PREP Act
- Enacted by: the 109th United States Congress
- Effective: December 2005

Citations
- Public law: 109–148
- Statutes at Large: 42 Stat. 247d-6d

The Public Readiness and Emergency Preparedness Act (commonly referred to as the PREP Act or PREPA), passed by the United States Congress and signed into law by President of the United States George W. Bush in December 2005 (as part of Public Law 109-148), is a controversial tort liability shield intended to protect pharmaceutical manufacturers from financial risk in the event of a declared public health emergency. The part of the PREP Act that actually affords such protection is now codified at 42 U.S.C. § 247d-6d. The act specifically affords to drug makers immunity from actions related to the manufacture, testing, development, distribution, administration and use of medical countermeasures against chemical, biological, radiological and nuclear agents of terrorism, epidemics, and pandemics. PREPA strengthens and consolidates the oversight of litigation against pharmaceutical companies under the purview of the secretary of Health and Human Services (HHS). PREPA provides $3.8 billion for pandemic influenza the PREP Actredness to protect public health in the case of a pandemic disease outbreak.

Vaccine manufacturers lobbied for the legislation, which would effectively preempt state vaccine safety laws in the case of an emergency declaration by HHS, by making clear they would not produce new vaccines unless the legislation was enacted. Injured parties are compensated by the Countermeasures Injury Compensation Program.

During and in the aftermath of the 2020–21 COVID-19 pandemic in the United States, the PREP Act is being invoked in a variety of lawsuits, many involving skilled nursing or assisted living facilities where COVID-19 countermeasures including the administration or non-administration of vaccines is said to have resulted in or contributed to resident deaths. Although the PREP Act was around for more than 15 years, prior to COVID-19, the act's defensive application in litigation was not widespread, but now the application of the act is being included more frequently in a variety of COVID-19 related lawsuits, including Shareholder Derivative Litigation.

== Legislative process ==
Legislative leaders Senator Bill Frist and Congressman Dennis Hastert were among the backers of the PREP Act. Rep. Nathan Deal spoke on the House floor in support of the bill, calling it "absolutely critical legislation". It was added to the final version of a Department of Defense-appropriations bill (H.R. 2863) while the bill was negotiated between the Senate and the House of Representatives.

On December 19, 2005, an appropriations bill containing the PREPA legislation was approved by the House of Representatives in a vote of 308–106, with 2 voting Present and 18 not voting. On December 22, it was approved by the Senate in a vote of 93–0, with 7 not voting. President Bush signed the bill into law on December 30.

== Funding ==
Of the $3.8 billion earmarked for pandemic preparedness, $350 million is slated for improvement of state and local preparedness. HHS will use most of the balance on "core preparedness activities", such as developing vaccines and stockpiling antiviral drugs. Under the PREP Act, an HHS emergency declaration will trigger establishment of a fund for "timely, uniform, and adequate compensation" program for vaccine injuries, but no funding provisions for such purposes were included in its language.

== Liability protection and consolidation of oversight ==
PREPA was designed specifically to encourage rapid production of vaccines to protect American citizens in case of a potential public health threat. However, the primary effects of the legislation hinge on liability protections for drug companies, under provisions intended to remove financial risk barriers for any new vaccines that need to be rushed to market in case of an emergency. Under the PREP Act, the HHS secretary will have primary responsibility for making decisions on whether or not to declare an emergency that would justify removing financial risk barriers, which otherwise would cause a prudent manufacturer to exercise caution. Pursuant to such an emergency declaration, liability protection would extend to doctors and other individuals and organizations involved with countermeasures, which may include any medical product to prevent, treat, mitigate, or diagnose an epidemic.

The act does not list any criteria for determining the existence of an emergency, but it does specify that any such declaration would have to list the diseases, populations, and geographic areas covered and when the emergency would end.

PREPA removes the right to a jury trial for persons injured by a covered vaccine, unless a plaintiff can provide clear evidence of willful misconduct that resulted in death or serious physical injury. The act instructs the HHS secretary to write regulations "that further restrict the scope of actions or omissions by a covered person" that constitute willful misconduct.

A plaintiff whose claim is subject to the PREP Act can sue the defendant only in the United States District Court for the District of Columbia. For such a civil action, the PREP Act requires the complaint to be pleaded with particularity, verified under oath by the plaintiff, and accompanied by an affidavit from a non-treating physician to explain how the covered countermeasure injured the plaintiff, as well as relevant medical records.

In the event of an emergency declared by HHS, Federal law would preempt all state provisions related to pandemic emergency preparedness, and would supersede any state provision governing vaccines. PREPA applies to any drug, vaccine, or biological product that the HHS secretary deems a "covered countermeasure," or that the secretary decides is a public health situation that could become an emergency at some point in the future, whether or not there is a specific relationship to a dangerous pandemic or bioterrorism.

By invoking provisions of the PREP Act, the HHS secretary can wield broad authority to declare an emergency, which in turn would trigger drug company immunity from liability at any time, thereby conferring upon drug companies legal immunity for harm caused by their misconduct. The immunity that could be conferred on drug and vaccine manufacturers can be applied regardless of wrongdoing by affected drug companies.

== Definitions ==
The PREP Act defines terms such as covered countermeasure and qualified pandemic or epidemic product in terms related to the Federal Food, Drug, and Cosmetic Act of 1938, specifically section 201(g) drugs and section 201(h) medical devices. The definitions of security countermeasure and biological product are related only internally.

PREPA covers many kinds of loss, including

1. death;
2. physical, mental, or emotional injury, illness, disability, or condition;
3. fear of physical, mental, or emotional injury, illness, disability, or condition, including any need for medical monitoring; and
4. loss of or damage to property, including business interruption loss.

== Opposition ==
Numerous consumer organizations vigorously opposed the legislation, including A-CHAMP, Eagle Forum, and Public Citizen, as well as first responder organizations representing nurses, firemen and veterans. A-CHAMP ran a series of full page advertisements in various publications in opposition to the PREP Act. Because the legislation delegates broad legislative power to the executive branch of government, opponents view it as a violation of fundamental principles of the U.S. Constitution.

In 2005, Senator Edward Kennedy issued a statement demanding repeal of the PREPA legislation, while condemning the liability provisions as a giveaway to the drug industry. Kennedy said the bill makes it "essentially impossible" for injured parties to sue for damages, and that the measure allows common diseases to be used as a reason to activate the liability shield. Kennedy also asserted that one of the drug companies that lobbied for the PREP Act is Sanofi Pasteur, which was under Food and Drug Administration (FDA) investigation for being connected to at least five cases of Guillain–Barré syndrome asserted to have been caused by its meningococcal vaccine.

When the PREP Act legislation was presented, its broad liability shields, its potential for undermining state vaccine laws, and its consolidation of responsibility within the executive branch were misrepresented in Congress and media, according to critics, who note that it was portrayed instead as primarily concerned with preparations to combat the avian flu.

Opponents also contended that the PREP Act would contribute to the potential for abuse of discretion by the George W. Bush Administration, which was generally perceived as friendly to the drug industry. In particular, critics were concerned about the possibility that state laws banning thimerosal containing vaccines (TCVs) may be preempted. If the HHS secretary designates that a vaccine is a covered countermeasure, thimerosal (a mercury containing preservative) can be used in the vaccine, even in states that have enacted such bans.

== See also ==
- Vaccines for the New Millennium Act
