= Prepa =

Town of ancient Bithynia inhabited during Roman times

Coordinates: 40°51′23″N 29°45′02″E

Prepa was an inland town of ancient Bithynia inhabited during Roman times. Its name does not occur in ancient authors, but is inferred from epigraphic and other evidence.

Its site is located near Ekşioğlu in Asiatic Turkey.
