= Robert J. Anderson (public health administrator) =

American medical administrator (1914–1999)

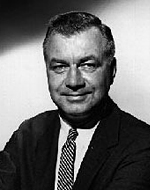

Chief of the Communicable Disease Center
- In office October 1, 1956 – June 30, 1960
- President: Dwight D. Eisenhower
- Preceded by: Theodore J. Bauer
- Succeeded by: Clarence A. Smith

Personal details
- Born: 1914 Zumbrota, Minnesota, U.S.
- Died: July 24, 1999 (aged 85) Arlington, Virginia, U.S.
- Spouse: Ruth Kittleson Anderson (m. 1940)
- Children: 2
- Education: Carleton College; University of Minnesota Medical School

Robert John Anderson (1914 – July 24, 1999) was the chief of the Communicable Disease Center (CDC) of the United States Public Health Service, forerunner to the modern Centers for Disease Control and Prevention, from October 1, 1956, to June 30, 1960.

Anderson was born in Zumbrota, Minnesota. He graduated from Carleton College, and attended medical school at the University of Minnesota. After medical school he joined the Public Health Service. As an intern, he worked at the Staten Island Public Health Service Hospital, including a stint in the venereal disease unit during World War II alongside John Friend Mahoney.

After studying public health at Columbia University under a Rockefeller fellowship, Anderson worked on tuberculosis control. In 1947 he became the chief of the Tuberculosis Control program at the Public Health Service. He left the tuberculosis program in 1956 to become head of the Communicable Disease Center. At the CDC, Anderson oversaw the building of the Atlanta campus.

After the CDC, Anderson returned to Washington, DC and worked on environmental health, including as Chief of the Bureau of State Services.

He retired from the Public Health Service in 1966. After retirement, he served as medical director of the American Thoracic Society and (from 1970 to 1974) managing director of a forerunner to the American Lung Association.

Anderson died of an aortic aneurysm on July 24, 1999, at his home in Arlington, Virginia, at the age of 85. He married his wife Ruth Kittleson in 1940 and they had two children: Robert J. Anderson Jr. and Julia Anderson.

== Selected works ==
- Anderson, Robert J. (1953). "Current Status of Tuberculosis Control in the United States". American Journal of Public Health and the Nation's Health. 43 (8). American Public Health Association: 961–964. doi:10.2105/ajph.43.8.961. ISSN 0002-9572. PMC 1620390. PMID 13065551.
- Anderson, Robert J. (1961). "Getting on with the public health job". American Journal of Public Health and the Nation's Health. 51 (10). American Public Health Association: 1590–1592. doi:10.2105/ajph.51.10.1590. ISSN 0002-9572.
- Anderson, Robert J. (1963). "New Directions in Environmental Health". American Journal of Public Health and the Nation's Health. 53 (9). American Public Health Association: 1439–1446. doi:10.2105/ajph.53.9.1439. ISSN 0002-9572. PMC 1254314. PMID 14042540.
