= Joseph Walter Mountin =

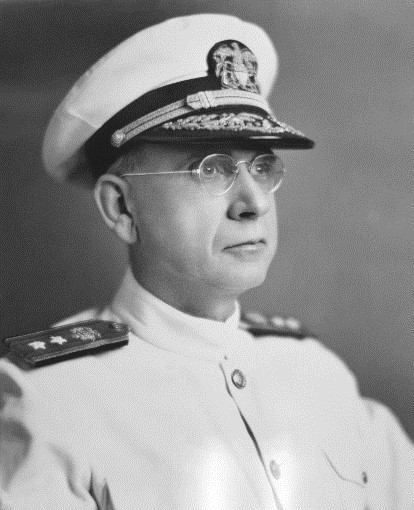
Rear Admiral Joseph Walter Mountin of the U.S. Public Health Service Commissioned Corps.

Joseph Walter Mountin MD (October 13, 1891 – April 26, 1952) was an American physician and career United States Public Health Service (USPHS) officer who was the founder of the U.S. Centers for Disease Control and Prevention in Atlanta, Georgia. Mountin eventually became an assistant surgeon general. He was involved in many advancements in medical and sanitary science during his lifetime. He was an early advocate for a national health care system and wrote frequently on the need to provide broader health care coverage. He was considered influential in the development of public health improvements.

== Early life and education ==
Joseph Walter Mountin was born October 13, 1891, in Hartford, Wisconsin, one of seven children in a middle-income farm family. He referred to himself in later years as "a simple Wisconsin farm boy, born in the shadow of a silo."

In 1895, Joseph, 4 and his brother Ned, age 5, were stricken with diphtheria, an epidemic sweeping eastern Wisconsin. Ned died, but Joseph survived.

Mountin received his medical degree from Marquette University School of Medicine in June 1914, followed by a Bachelor of Science from Marquette in 1916.

== Public Health Service career ==
Mountin served internships at the Milwaukee County Hospital and the Chicago Lying-In Hospital before entering the USPHS in August 1917 as a scientific assistant. He was assigned to manage safe and healthy zones surrounding temporary military camps constructed during World War I in Louisville, Kentucky; Des Moines, Iowa; and Waco, Texas. In July 1918, he was commissioned as an assistant surgeon and began training in quarantine duty, marine hospital service, and health administration.

His first assignment came in September 1921 to the Tri-State Sanitary District in Joplin, Missouri. His assignment was to support county health units from county boards and local Red Cross chapters. He introduced programs for prevention and control of malaria, trachoma, and tuberculosis, and promoted state health services for sanitary engineering, public health nursing, maternal and child health, and vital statistics. In 1922, Mountin moved to Jefferson City to work with the Missouri State Health Department and encourage creation of local health agencies. He remained in Missouri until 1926 organizing local health departments, and doing program development, and staffing.

He left Missouri for a four-year assignment as special assistant to Dr. E. L. Bishop, the commissioner of the Tennessee State Health Department, in the organization of local public health agencies. He aided in the development of a training program for health officers. The program combined academic instruction in an educational institution with supervised field experience in a health department. During this time, Mountin also began writing, utilizing surveys he would conduct of public health organization and administration. He also received his first national experience, acting as secretary of the public health section of the 1930 White House Conference on Child Health and Protection. This was the start of many similar assignments.

In 1931, Mountin transferred to Washington to direct the new USPHS Office of Studies of Public Health Methods in the Division of Scientific Research. He led studies and prepared recommendations on the relation of housing to health; on health-promoting possibilities for accident prevention, heart disease, and cancer. He warned of the health dangers related to air pollution.

From 1935 to 1937, he was tasked to the National Survey, a joint project of the Public Health Service and the Works Progress Administration, which analyzed the nation's hospital resources and their role in public health. He was critical of hospital construction planning and advocated for regional planning, preferably through local health departments. Over the next several years, Mountin's analytical reports on hospitals, including the first national survey of U.S. hospitals, provided information on size, equipment, occupancy, income, expenditures, and personnel that formed the statistical basis for enactment in 1946 of the Hospital Survey and Construction Law (Hill-Burton Free and Reduced-Cost Health Care). The law supplied hospitals, nursing homes, and other health facilities with grants and loans for construction and modernization in exchange for agreement to deliver care for a reasonable number of patients unable to pay.

In 1937, the Division of Scientific Research was eliminated and Mountin was named chief of the new Division of Public Health Methods that was assigned statistical investigations, child hygiene, milk sanitation, and water pollution. In 1939, Mountin became chief of the Division of Domestic Quarantine, later named the Division of States Relations and then the Bureau of State Services, which was responsible for administration of federal grants to states for health services. He placed specialists in regional offices to provide consultation and technical services to the states.

With the onset of World War II, Mountin's division became responsible for directing the nationwide emergency health and sanitation program, which helped maintain national health during that time in which there were medical and sanitation shortages, a rapid growth of industrial communities and military installations, and shifts in population. In 1942, the problem of malaria, primarily in 15 southeastern states where most of the U.S. basic military training was conducted, threatened the war effort and prompted creation of a new unit of the USPHS, the Malaria Control in War Areas (MCWA), which was located in Atlanta, Georgia. Its chief job was malaria control and prevention around military bases and industrial complexes crucial to the war effort. Mountin recognized the opportunity MCWA offered for protecting the health and safety of the nation during peacetime as an agency that could assist states with laboratory and epidemiologic investigations and training. Discussions regarding the broad concept of a post war MCWA successor agency began in 1944 with U.S. Surgeon General Thomas Parran, Mountin and Mark D. Hollis, MCWA director, and later included, among others, Dr. Rolla E. Dyer, director of the National Institute of Health (NIH).

=== Communicable Disease Center (CDC) ===
On July 1, 1946, MCWA became a field station in the State Relations Division of the Bureau of State Services called the Communicable Disease Center (CDC), and expanded its mission to put an emphasis on disease surveillance and control. Mountin's vision was for a center of technical competence for research and training that could quickly and efficiently provide states services in specific operational fields. He envisioned centers of excellence concentrating on environmental issues, communicable disease, and emerging issues of Arctic health, as well as serving as a key resource for state health departments. He secured approval from Congress for CDC, although legislative authorization was unnecessary. Mountin is "deservedly known as the 'father' of this center," wrote Dr. Parran, U.S. Surgeon General, in 1952. While some suggested Hollis deserved credit for the creation of CDC, Hollis himself deflected that talk and noted Mountin was the man behind the success of MCWA and its conversion to CDC. The CDC and its around 400 former MCWA employees, mostly engineers and entomologists, occupied MCWA's offices in Atlanta with a budget of $1.6 million. Malaria eradication efforts dominated its initial mission with 59 percent of its staff concentrating on killing mosquitoes. More than 6.5 million homes were eventually sprayed and the CDC's early organization chart was drawn glibly in the shape of a mosquito. While there was progress in the prevention and control of malaria, as well as typhus and yellow fever, Mountin reminded staff CDC was responsible for all communicable diseases. To endure as an agency, Mountin believed CDC had to become a center for epidemiology and he originated the idea for epidemiological intelligence that led to the founding in 1951 of the CDC's Epidemic Intelligence Service. The concept of disease surveillance became crucial to public health practice.

Mountin's acquaintances with Emory University and Coca-Cola, cultivated while at MCWA, led to CDC remaining in Atlanta. Emory University, founded by the Methodist Episcopal Church, gifted 15 acres of land adjacent to its campus on Clifton Road in Atlanta in 1947 to CDC for its headquarters for a token payment of $10. CDC employees collected money to make the purchase. The land was offered at the behest of Robert W. Woodruff, chairman of the board of the Coca-Cola Co., and an Emory board of trustees member. Woodruff held a long interest in malaria because the disease was widespread on his 36,000-acre hunting preserve in southeastern Georgia and it affected the health of the area's tenant farmers and their families. It was Dr. Glenville Giddings, an Emory physician and medical adviser to Coca-Cola, who spurred Woodruff's interest in the USPHS and brought Emory and CDC together. Giddings was friends with both Mountin and Hollis. Due to budget issues in Washington, however, it was another decade before construction commenced on CDC's main campus.

=== Bureau of State Services ===
Mountin was associate chief of the Bureau of State Services when MCWA transitioned into the CDC, and was named chief of the bureau in 1951, six months before his death at age 61.

== Other work ==
At the time CDC was created, Mountin was assigned the task of spokesman for the USPHS on the idea of a national health program. At the request of Surgeon General Parran, Mountin testified in 1946 before a Senate committee about the need for a nationwide program of medical care that held the promise of assuring adequate medical care for all. In his testimony, Mountin pointed out that the lowest income group, which had the greatest frequency and longest duration of illnesses, received the smallest amount of medical services. Previously, Mountin had been part of a five-member committee that the Interdepartmental Committee to Coordinate Health and Welfare Activities asked to conduct a survey of the government's health and medical care. The group drafted a report titled "National Health Program," which was sent to President Roosevelt in 1938. Recommendations included expanding public health and maternal and child health services under the Social Security Act, expanding hospital facilities, and expanding medical care to all who were in need, including those on relief, through grants-in-ad to the states. U.S. Sen. Robert F. Wagner took many of the recommendations discussed in the report and at the National Health Conference and introduced his National Health Bill, which granted states the right to establish compulsory health insurance. The bill died in committee.

In 1947, Mountin initiated the first major government-supported population study, the Framingham Heart Study, in Massachusetts by the National Heart Institute, to concentrate on epidemiological research rather than heart disease control. The study has identified common factors or characteristics that contribute to cardiovascular disease for over four decades.

Mountin also served on international missions before and during World War II. In 1944, he was a special health adviser to the Bhor Commission for the Government of India. He was requested by General MacArthur in 1947 to be the health member of the Social Security Mission sent to Japan. In 1949, he was adviser on health and welfare to the Economic Mission to Colombia, South America that was organized by the International Bank for Reconstruction and Development. At the time of his death, Mountin was on the World Health Organization's Expert Committee on Public Health Administration and supervising an international survey to appraise the 10-year program of health and sanitation of the Institute of Inter-American Affairs.

== Personal life ==
While on USPHS assignment in Missouri, Mountin met a Red Cross nurse, Genevieve B. Bazan, whom he married June 30, 1923. They were together for 29 years until his sudden death in 1952 at the age of 61. She died May 18, 1988, and is buried next to her husband in Arlington National Cemetery. The couple had three children, Daniel Mountin Sr., David Joseph Mountin and Joan Hopke.

== Legacy ==
In honor of its founder, CDC established the Annual Joseph W. Mountin Lecture in 1980 to address important contemporary public health issues. The talks, usually held in October every year, celebrate CDC's accomplishments in the field of public health, acknowledging CDC's multi-talented employees and their dedication to protecting and improving health for all.

== Selected publications ==
- Mountin, J. W., Flook, E. E., Minty, E. E., Mullins, R. F., Christensen, A. W., Druzina, G. B., Ferrell, J. A., ... United States. (1952). Distribution of health services in the structure of State government, 1950. Washington, D.C: Bureau of States Services, Division of State Grants.
- United States, & Mountin, J. W. (1950). Public health areas and hospital facilities: A plan for coordination. Washington.
- Mountin, J. W., Flook, E., Minty, E. E., Mullins, R. F., Christensen, A. W., & Druzina, G. B. (1952). Distribution of health services in the structure of state government, 1950.
- Mountin, J. W., & Flook, E. E. (1947). Guide to health organization in the United States, 1951. Washington: U.S. Govt. Print. Off.
- Mountin, J. W., Hoge, V. M., & Pennell, E. H. (1945). Health Service Areas. Requirements for General Hospitals and health centres. By J.W. Mountin ... Elliott H. Pennell ... Vane M. Hoge. Washington.
- Mountin, J. W., Kovar, E. B., & United States. (1949). Emergency health and sanitation activities of the Public Health Service during World War II. Washington, D.C: United States Government Printing Office.
- Mountin, J. W., & Joseph W. Mountin Memorial Committee. (1956). Selected papers. Place of publication not identified: Joseph W. Mountin Memorial Committee.
- Mountin, J. W., Borowski, A. J., O'Hara, H., & United States. (1938). Variations in the form and services of public health organizations.
- Mountin, J. W., Pennell, E. H., Flook, E. E., & United States. (1937). Illness and medical care in Puerto Rico. Washington, D.C: United States Government Printing Office.
- Mountin, J. W., Greve, C. H., & United States. (1949). The role of grants-in-aid in financing public health programs. Washington, D.C: Federal Security Agency, Public Health Service.
- Mountin, J. W., Pennell, E. H., Flook, E. E., & United States. (1936). Experience of the health department in 811 counties, 1908–34. Washington, D.C: United States Government Printing Office.
- Mountin, J. W., Townsend, J. G., & United States. (1936). Observations on Indian health problems and facilities. Washington, D.C: U.S. G.P.O.
- Mountin, J. W., Hankla, E. K., Druzina, G. B., & United States. (1948). Ten years of federal grants-in aid for public health, 1936–1946. Washington, D.C: Federal Security Agency, Public Health Service.
- United States. & Mountin, J. W. (1932). Study of public health service, Seattle, Washington. Washington.
