= Bureau of Health Workforce =

US federal bureau

The Bureau of Health Workforce is a part of the Health Resources and Services Administration (HRSA), of the United States Department of Health and Human Services. HRSA programs train health care professionals and place them where they are needed most. Grants support scholarship and loan repayment programs at colleges and universities to meet critical workforce shortages and promote diversity within the health professions.

The Bureau was formed in 1967, absorbing the U.S. Public Health Service Division of Nursing, which was formed in 1899, and Division of Dental Public Health, which was formed in 1949.

== Programs ==
HRSA closely tracks trends in the national healthcare workforce, and issues targeted grants to colleges and universities for scholarship, student loan and debt repayment programs designed to stimulate interest in clinical specialties in which shortages are expected. About 8,000 students graduate each year from these HRSA-supported institutions — and one of every three goes to work serving the disadvantaged.

HRSA is the lead federal agency responsible for collecting data, and certifying communities as Health Professional Shortage Areas. The designation takes into consideration such factors as the prevailing rate of poverty and infant mortality; the number of physicians per 1,000 residents; and travel distances to nearest available care. The HPSA designation determines eligibility for numerous federal and state aid programs, including the National Health Service Corps, Nursing Education Loan Repayment Program and Rural Health Clinic Certification.

=== Nursing recruitment and retention ===
With a national workforce shortage of 1 million nurses projected by 2025, HRSA supports academic and continuing education projects designed to recruit and retain a strong nursing workforce.

Through the Nurse Education, Practice, Quality and Retention Program, funds are used to increase enrollment in nursing programs, expand nursing practice to improve access to primary health care in medically underserved communities, and support efforts to promote the retention of nurses in the workforce.

Through the Advanced Education Nursing Program, HRSA supports projects that enhance advanced nursing education and practice. This program encourages individuals to serve as nurse practitioners, clinical nurse specialists, nurse midwives, nurse anesthetists, nurse educators, nurse administrators or public health nurses.

The Nursing Workforce Diversity Program increases nursing education opportunities for individuals from disadvantaged backgrounds, through providing stipends and scholarships, pre-entry preparation, and retention activities for minority nursing students, pre-nursing students, and students in elementary and secondary schools.

=== Area Health Education Centers ===
HRSA supports a network of more than 200 community-based training sites in 47 states and the District of Columbia that provide educational services to students, faculty and practitioners in underserved areas with the aim of increasing the supply of qualified providers in those communities.

Through Geriatric Education Centers, HRSA helps educate and train health professional faculty, students and practitioners in the diagnosis, treatment and prevention of disease, disability and other health problems of the aged.

The Public Health Training Centers Program strengthens the workforce by providing fundamental training in the core competencies of public health.

The Children's Hospital Graduate Medical Education Payment Program provides federal support for direct and indirect graduate medical education of interns and residents in freestanding children's teaching hospitals.

=== Scholarship, loan, and loan repayment ===
HRSA provides funds to individual students from disadvantaged backgrounds to improve their education and graduation rates and improve their ranks in the health professions. The National Health Service Corps Loan Repayment Program is for primary care medical, dental, and mental and behavioral health clinicians; the National Health Service Corps Scholarship Program is for primary care medical and dental providers-in-training; the NURSE Corps Scholarship and Loan Repayment programs are for registered nurses and RN students; and the Faculty Loan Repayment Program is for health professions faculty from disadvantaged backgrounds.

HRSA provides training grants to institutions to expand the knowledge base of health professionals and support their continuing education. These funds also support students and faculty in programs designed to increase the number of nurses, pediatricians and primary care providers. The Health Professions Student Loans are for accredited schools of dentistry, optometry, pharmacy, podiatric medicine and veterinary medicine are eligible. Loans for Disadvantaged Students are for accredited schools of allopathic or osteopathic medicine, dentistry, optometry, pharmacy, podiatric medicine and veterinary medicine are eligible. Nursing Student Loans are for accredited schools leading to a diploma, associate, baccalaureate or graduate degree in nursing are eligible. Primary Care Loans are for accredited schools of allopathic and osteopathic medicine are eligible for this program which requires loan recipients to serve in primary care. The Centers of Excellence Program provides grants to health professional schools to support educational programs of excellence for underrepresented minority students. These programs strengthen our national capacity to train minority students in health professions.

=== Practitioner Data Banks ===
The National Practitioner Data Bank is a clearinghouse that provides information to eligible organizations about malpractice payments, adverse licensure, clinical privilege, and other negative actions taken against health care practitioners and entities.

The Healthcare Integrity and Protection Data Bank was merged into the National Practitioner Data Bank as of May 6, 2013, in accordance with 78 FR 20473.

=== Programs for disadvantaged students ===
The Health Careers Opportunity Program is designed to increase the number of individuals from educationally and economically disadvantaged backgrounds who are studying and working in the health and allied health professions. This program also provides support needed to compete, enter, and graduate from health or allied health professions' schools, graduate programs in behavior and mental health, and programs to train physician assistants.

HRSA promotes the recruitment, training and placement of minority candidates in Health Professional Shortage Areas (HPSAs) to ensure that the workforce is culturally sensitive and linguistically capable to serve patients of every background.

== History ==
The bureau's two earliest direct predecessors are the U.S. Public Health Service (PHS) Division of Nursing, which began in 1899 when PHS first formed divisions; and the Division of Dental Public Health, which was formed in 1949. The Bureau of Health Manpower was formed in 1967 and absorbed these two divisions.

From 1968 to 1973, the bureau was part of the National Institutes of Health, and then was transferred to the Health Resources Administration. In 1980, it was renamed the Bureau of Health Professions.

The Bureau of Clinician Recruitment and Service was split from the Bureau of Health Professions in 2007. The two bureaus were merged back together in 2014 to form the Bureau of Health Workforce.
