= Bureau of Medical Services =

Defunct US federal agency

Agency overview
- Formed: December 30, 1943; 82 years ago
- Preceding agency: Divisions of Hospitals, Foreign Quarantine, and Nursing
- Dissolved: December 31, 1966; 59 years ago
- Superseding agency: Bureau of Health Services
- Jurisdiction: Federal government of the United States
- Headquarters: Washington, D.C.
- Parent agency: U.S. Public Health Service

The Bureau of Medical Services (BMS) was a unit of the United States Public Health Service (PHS) that existed in two incarnations. The first was one of three principal operating agencies of PHS from 1943 until 1966, while the second was a division of the PHS Health Services Administration from 1973 until 1982. Both incarnations of the bureau had the principal responsibility of operating the PHS hospital system that had been founded in 1789.

Upon the formation of BMS in 1943, the system had already reached its peak of 30 hospitals, and this number decreased throughout BMS's existences as hospitals were closed. The first incarnation of BMS also had responsibilities in medical examination of foreigners entering the country, funding construction of hospitals by the states, researching the effective utilization of medical personnel and services, and providing healthcare to Native Americans.

The original BMS was broken up at the beginning of the Public Health Service reorganizations of 1966–1973, but a second incarnation of BMS was established at their end as a division of the Health Services Administration within PHS. This incarnation of BMS inherited only the hospital system and closely related functions, with the other programs located in other divisions. The system reached its final number of nine in 1970, and the system was abolished in 1981 with all but one hospital transferred to other organizations. The bureau was merged with another division in 1982 to form the current Bureau of Primary Health Care.

The other divisions of the original BMS now form the Indian Health Service, part of the Healthcare Systems Bureau of the Health Resources and Services Administration, the Division of Global Migration and Quarantine of the Centers for Disease Control and Prevention, and Federal Occupational Health within the Department of Health and Human Services Program Support Center.

== As operating agency of the Public Health Service ==
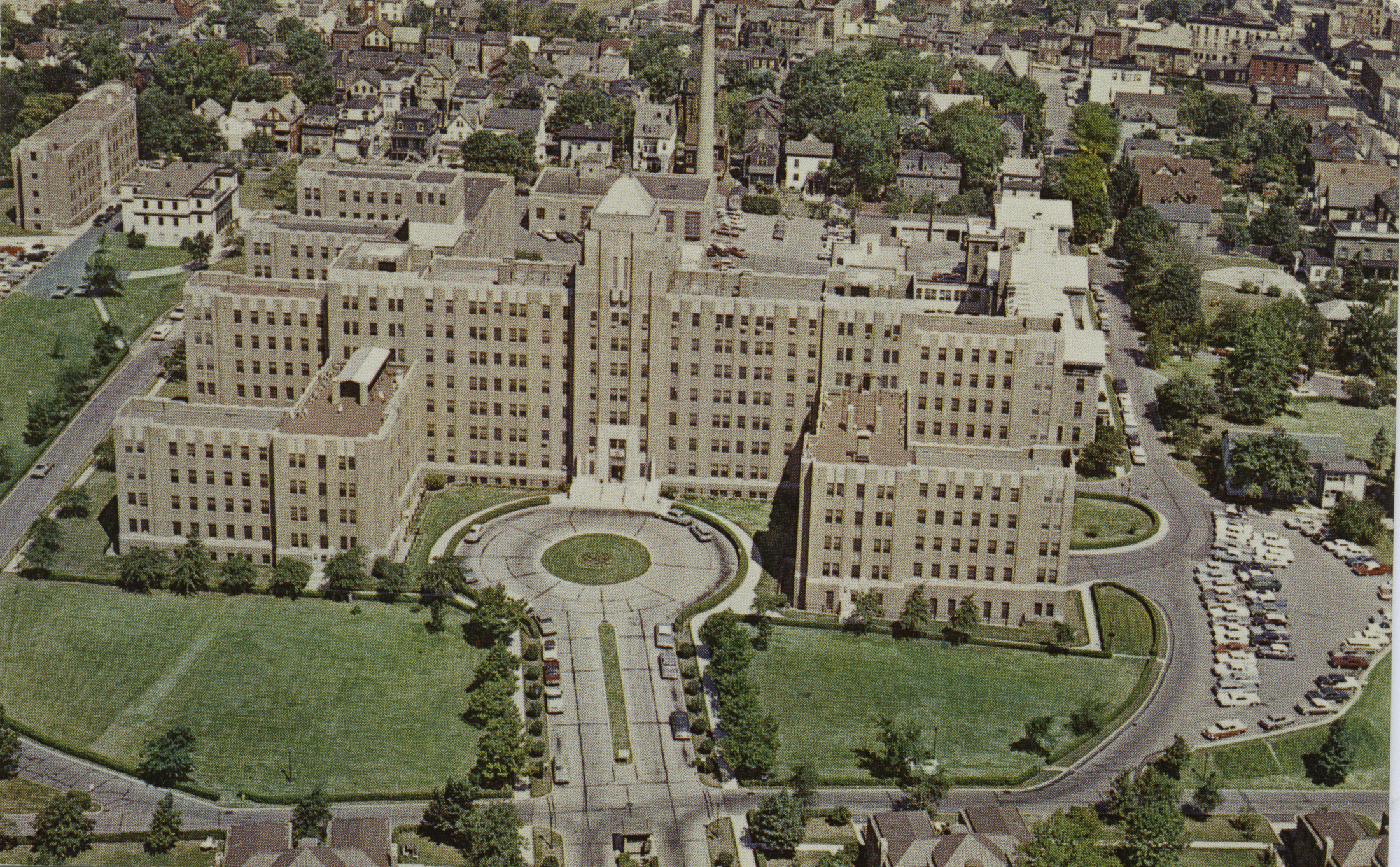
The Staten Island PHS Hospital was established in 1831, with the current main building constructed in the 1930s. After 1981 it became a private hospital.

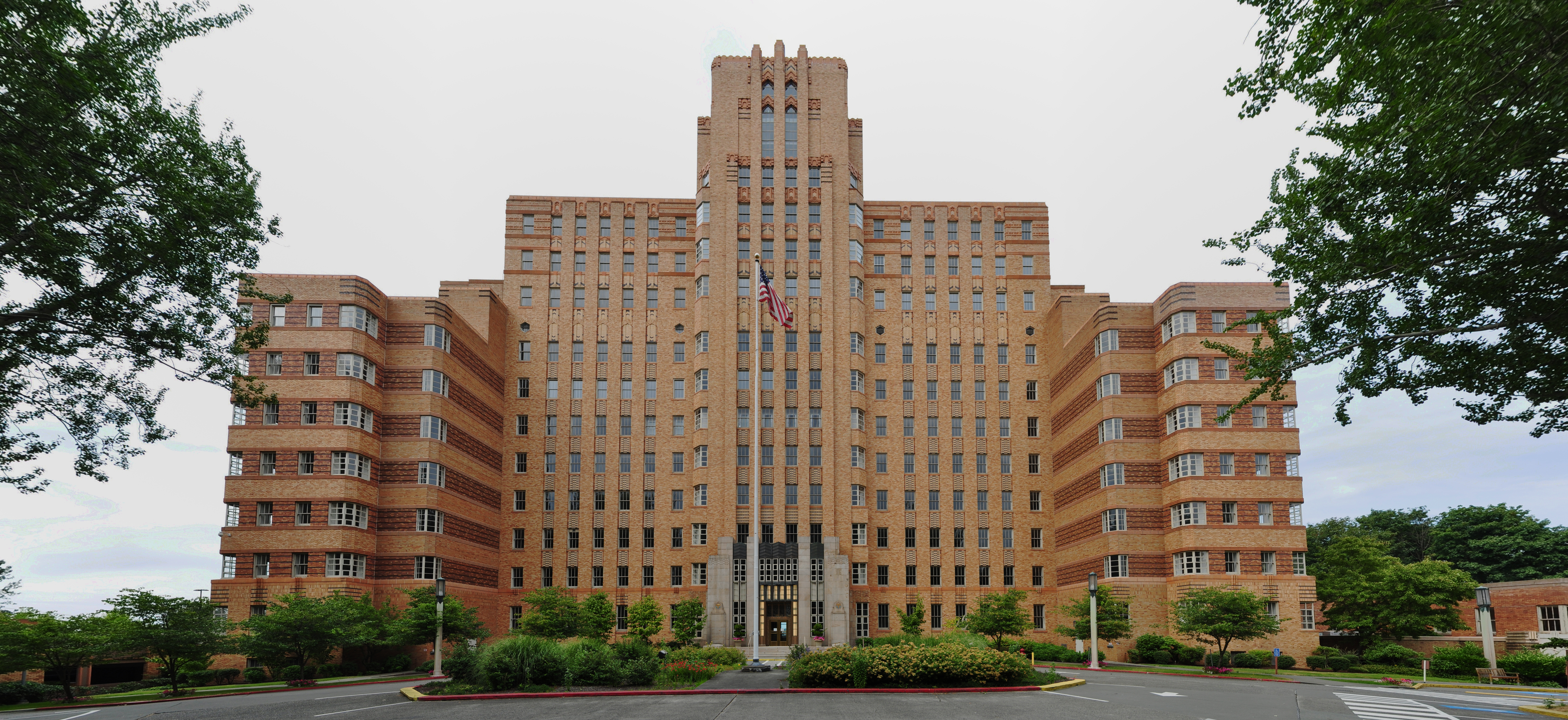
The Pacific Medical Center in Seattle opened in 1933. After 1981 it was transferred to the City of Seattle, which leased the building as office space.

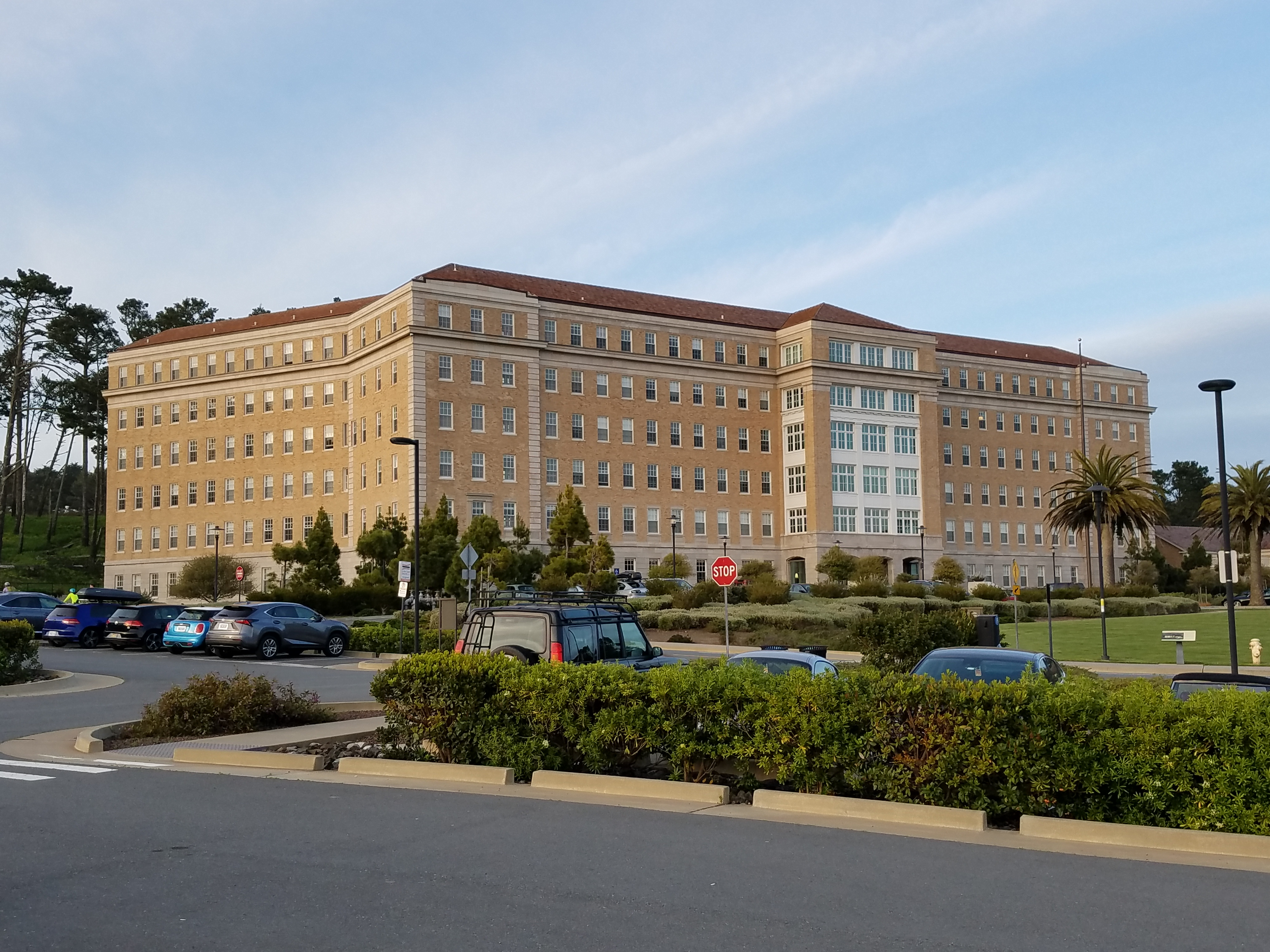
The PHS Hospital San Francisco was established in 1875, with the current building constructed in 1932. After 1981 it was used as a branch of the Defense Language Institute, was vacant for two decades, and then reopened in 2010 as apartments.

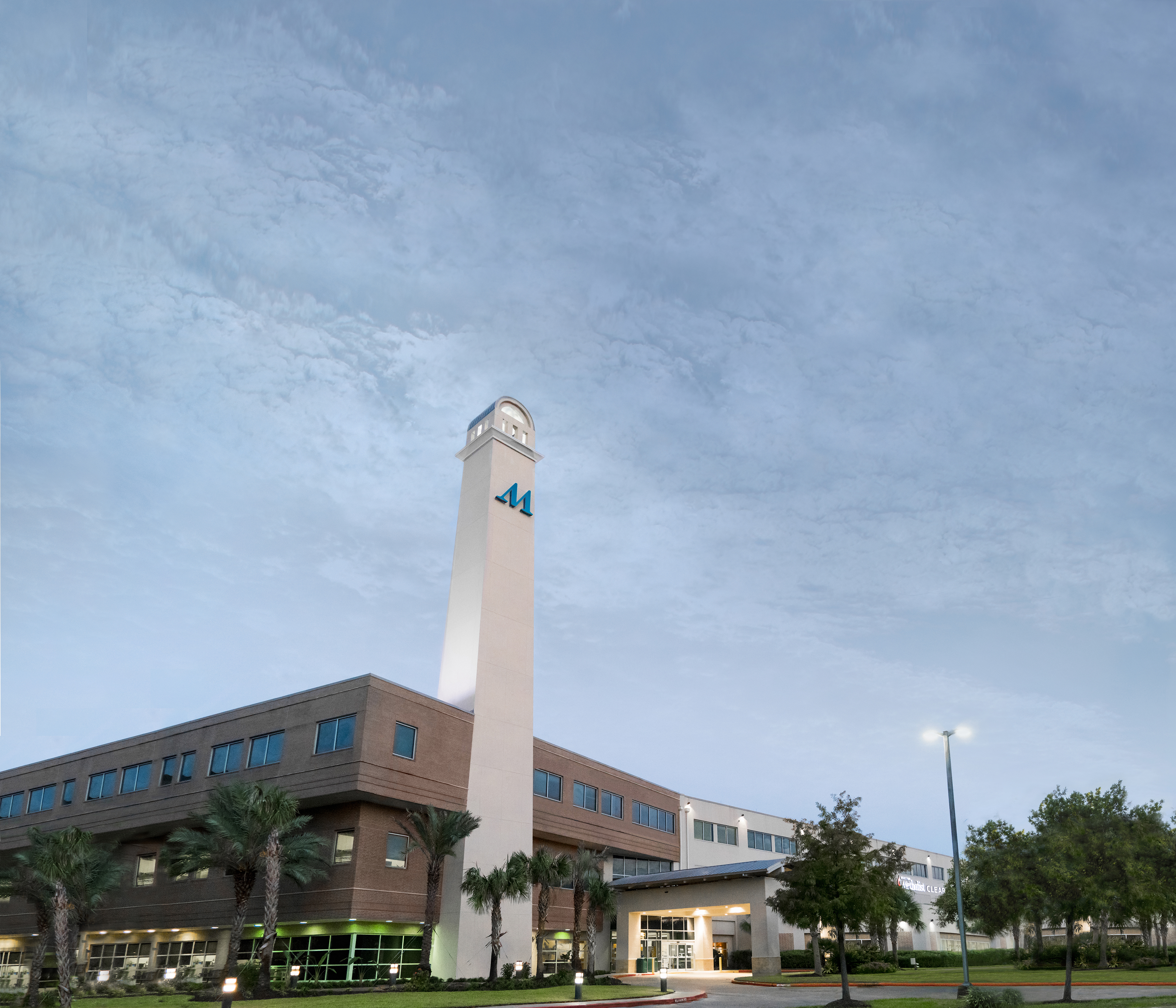
The Nassau Bay PHS Hospital opened in 1972 as a private hospital, but it went bankrupt a few years later and was taken over by PHS, replacing the Galveston hospital. It became private again after 1981.

=== Formation ===
The Marine Hospital Service, the predecessor of the U.S. Public Health Service (PHS), first divided itself into divisions in 1899. By 1943, PHS contained eight administrative divisions, plus the National Cancer Institute, St. Elizabeths Hospital, and Freedmen's Hospital under the direct supervision of the Surgeon General. These divisions often had overlapping scopes, which was seen as administratively unwieldy. Additionally, some of these had been created and specified through several pieces of legislation that were inconsistent in their scope, while some had been created internally by PHS or delegated from its parent agency, the Federal Security Agency.

A 1943 law (57 Stat. 587) collected PHS's divisions into three operating agencies. These were the National Institute of Health for laboratory research, the Bureau of State Services for administering cooperative services to U.S. states through technical and financial assistance, and the Bureau of Medical Services for direct patient care through hospitals and clinics.

In 1943, BMS consisted initially of the Hospital Division, Foreign Quarantine Division, and Office of Nursing. It also initially contained the Mental Hygiene Division, which was separated as the National Institute of Mental Health and moved into the National Institutes of Health in 1949.

=== Hospital system ===
As of 1957, the hospital system provided free healthcare to U.S. merchant seamen; active and retired United States Coast Guard personnel, officers of the United States Public Health Service Commissioned Corps and United States Coast and Geodetic Survey Corps, and their dependents; members of the general public with leprosy or narcotics addiction; and federal employees with compensable job-related illnesses and injuries. Occupational health programs for federal employees were part of the Division of Hospitals during most of the bureau's existence, but they were split out into a separate division for two brief periods, during 1947–1949, and 1966–1967.

In 1943, the hospital system had reached its peak of 30 hospitals. During 1944–1953, a wave of closings eliminated nine of the ten Marine Hospitals that had not been upgraded since the 1920s, the Savannah hospital being the sole exception. In addition, the general hospitals in Louisville, Kirkwood, and Cleveland, and the tuberculosis sanatorium at Fort Stanton were closed, and Freedmen's Hospital was transferred to Howard University. As of 1957, the Division of Hospitals operated 13 hospitals, 24 outpatient clinics, plus two neuropsychiatric hospitals and the National Leprosarium, and contracted with 155 other locations. In 1965, there were 12 general hospitals and the 3 special hospitals.

=== Other functions ===
The Foreign Quarantine Division provided examination and vaccination of foreigners entering the country, as well as pest control programs for ships and airplanes.

The Division of Health Facilities Construction was established in 1947. In 1949, the Division of Hospital Facilities was transferred from Bureau of State Services, and they were merged into the Division of Hospital and Medical Facilities in 1955. This division was transferred back to the Bureau of State Services around 1960. The division's function was to fund construction of hospitals by the states through the Hill–Burton Act, and research into effective utilization of hospital facilities.

In 1949, Divisions of Medical and Hospital Resources, Dental Resources, and Nursing Resources were established. The Division of Hospital and Medical Resources was abolished in 1953, and the latter two mere merged into their counterparts in the Bureau of State Services in 1960. These divisions researched the effective utilization of dental and nursing personnel and services.

The Division of Indian Health was acquired from Bureau of Indian Affairs in 1955.

== Reorganization period ==
BMS was abolished at the beginning of 1967 in the first of four major reorganizations of PHS. Most of BMS's divisions joined with the Bureau of State Services' Community Health Divisions to form the Bureau of Health Services in 1967, and then became part of the Health Services and Mental Health Administration (HSMHA) in 1968. The Division of Hospitals became the Federal Health Programs Service, the Division of Indian Health became the Indian Health Service, and the Division of Hospital and Medical Facilities became the Health Facilities Planning and Construction Service. The Division of Foreign Quarantine, however, was taken over by the Communicable Disease Center in 1967 to eventually become its Division of Global Migration and Quarantine.

A second wave of hospital closings during 1965–1970 closed the three remaining general hospitals at inland locations along the Mississippi River and Great Lakes, as well as the Savannah hospital. In addition, the psychiatric hospitals at Lexington and Fort Worth, as well as St. Elizabeths Hospital, were transferred to other organizations, and the Galveston hospital was replaced with one acquired by PHS in nearby Nassau Bay. This left eight general hospitals in the system, along with the National Leprosarium.

HSMHA was broken up in 1973. The Federal Health Programs Service became a new Bureau of Medical Services within the Health Services Administration (HSA), and the Indian Health Service was also moved into HSA. The Health Facilities Planning and Construction Service merged with the Community Health Service (which had come from the Bureau of State Services) to form the Bureau of Health Resources Development within the Health Resources Administration (HRA). The Indian Health Service would later be promoted to operating agency status in 1988.

== As division of the Health Services Administration ==
Bureau of Medical Services
Agency overview
- Formed: 1973; 53 years ago
- Preceding agency: Federal Health Programs Service
- Dissolved: 1982; 44 years ago
- Superseding agency: Bureau of Health Care Delivery and Assistance
- Headquarters: West Hyattsville, Maryland
- Parent agency: Health Services Administration

A 1980 pamphlet about the Bureau of Medical Services within the Health Services Administration

The second incarnation of the Bureau of Medical Services was strictly the successor of the old Division of Hospitals rather than the entire old bureau, as the other divisions were placed elsewhere in PHS.

In 1980, BMS ran eight general hospitals in Boston, Staten Island, Baltimore, Norfolk, New Orleans, Nassau Bay, San Francisco, and Seattle, plus 28 outpatient clinics and the National Leprosarium. It also included separate divisions for Coast Guard medical services, federal employee occupational health, and emergency medical services.

The PHS hospital system had been the target of efforts to close the entire system since the mid-1970s, but these efforts were hampered by a federal law that required the system to be funded to at least the 1973 level, and the opposition of Senator Warren Magnuson, who retired in 1980. This law was repealed in 1981 as the result of pressure from the Reagan administration. This forced the end of PHS hospital system by the end of 1981, with the last eight hospitals transferred to other organizations.

The Reagan Administration's intention was to completely close the hospitals that were in poorer condition, but this faced opposition from local groups concerned about decreases in hospital capacity. The administrator of the Seattle Hospital even refused to stop admitting patients even after being specifically directed to do so by authorities in Washington, leading to a confrontation between him and eight federal inspectors. The opposition led to Congress approving additional funds to improve the hospitals to state and local standards, so they could continue to be operated by other agencies or organizations. Ultimately, five hospitals were transferred to non-governmental entities, two to the Department of Defense, and one to the State of Louisiana. PHS would however continue to operate the National Leprosarium until 1999.

In 1982, the Health Services Administration merged with the Health Resources Administration to form the Health Resources and Services Administration. As part of the merge, the Bureau of Medical Services merged with the Bureau of Community Health Services to form the Bureau of Health Care Delivery and Assistance, which was renamed the Bureau of Primary Health Care in 1992. The Division of Federal Occupational Health remained in the merged bureau, but by 2003, it had been transferred to the Program Support Center, part of the Office of the Assistant Secretary for Administration.

== Hospitals ==
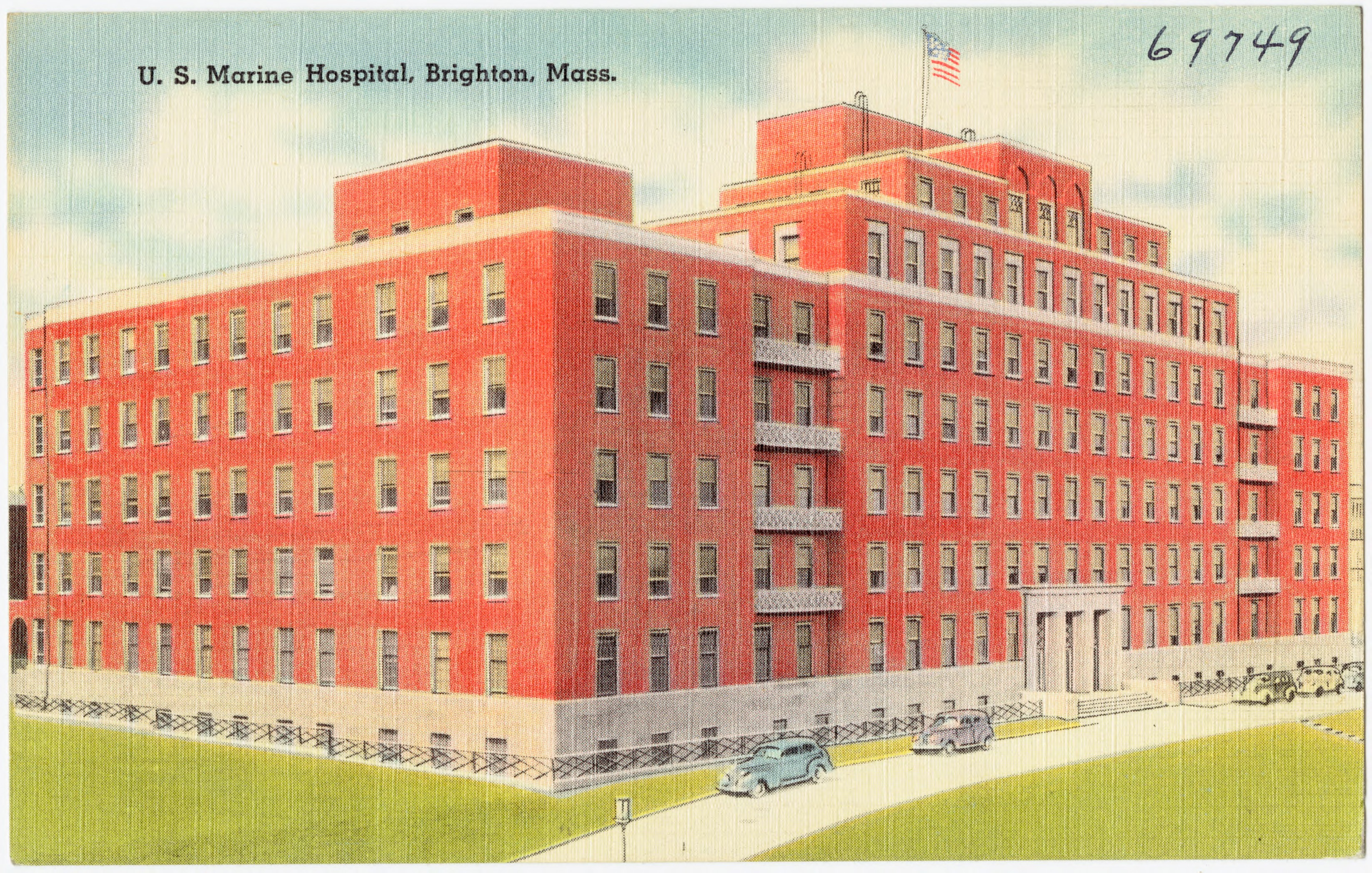
Boston PHS Hospital

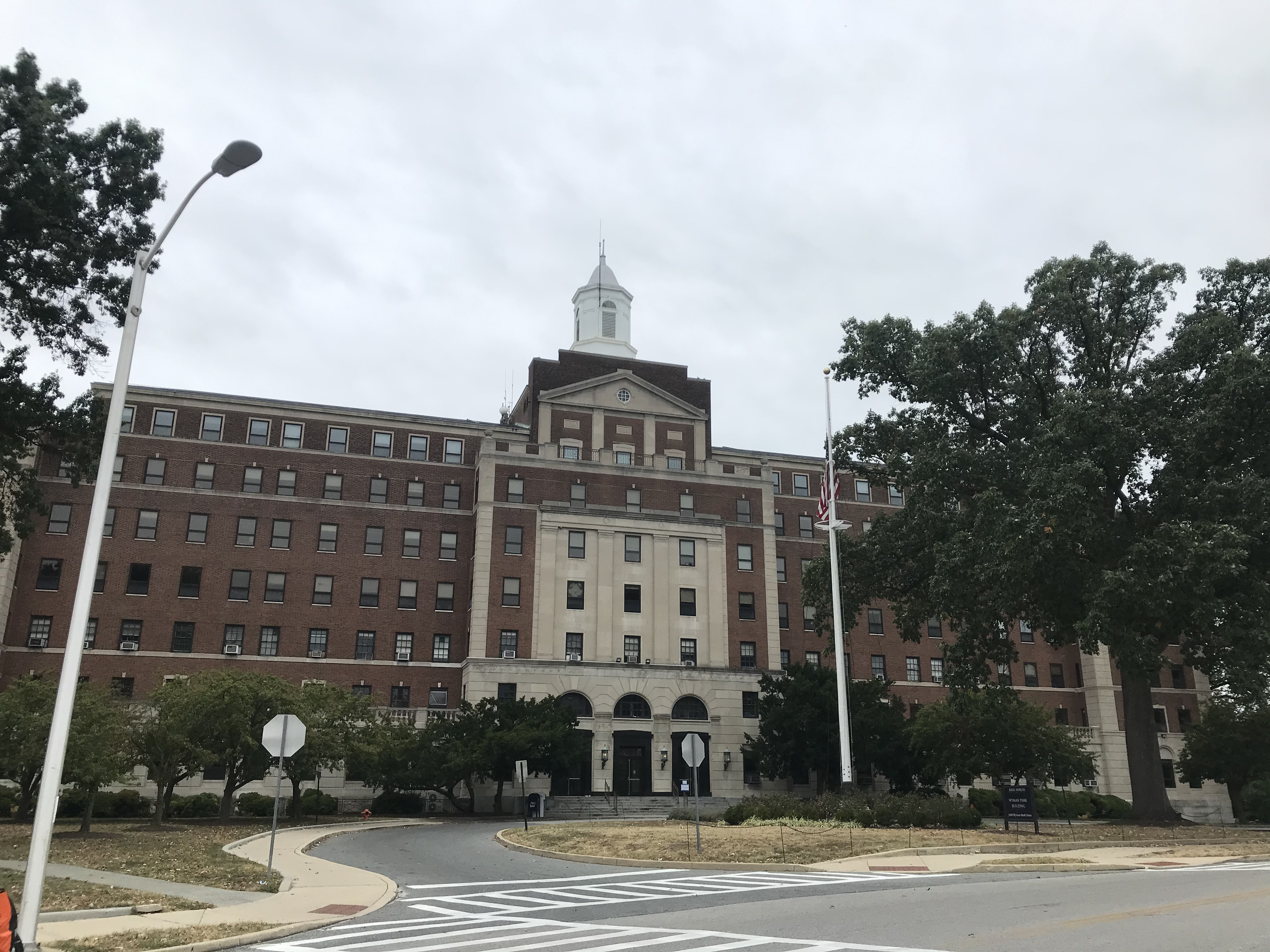
Baltimore PHS Hospital

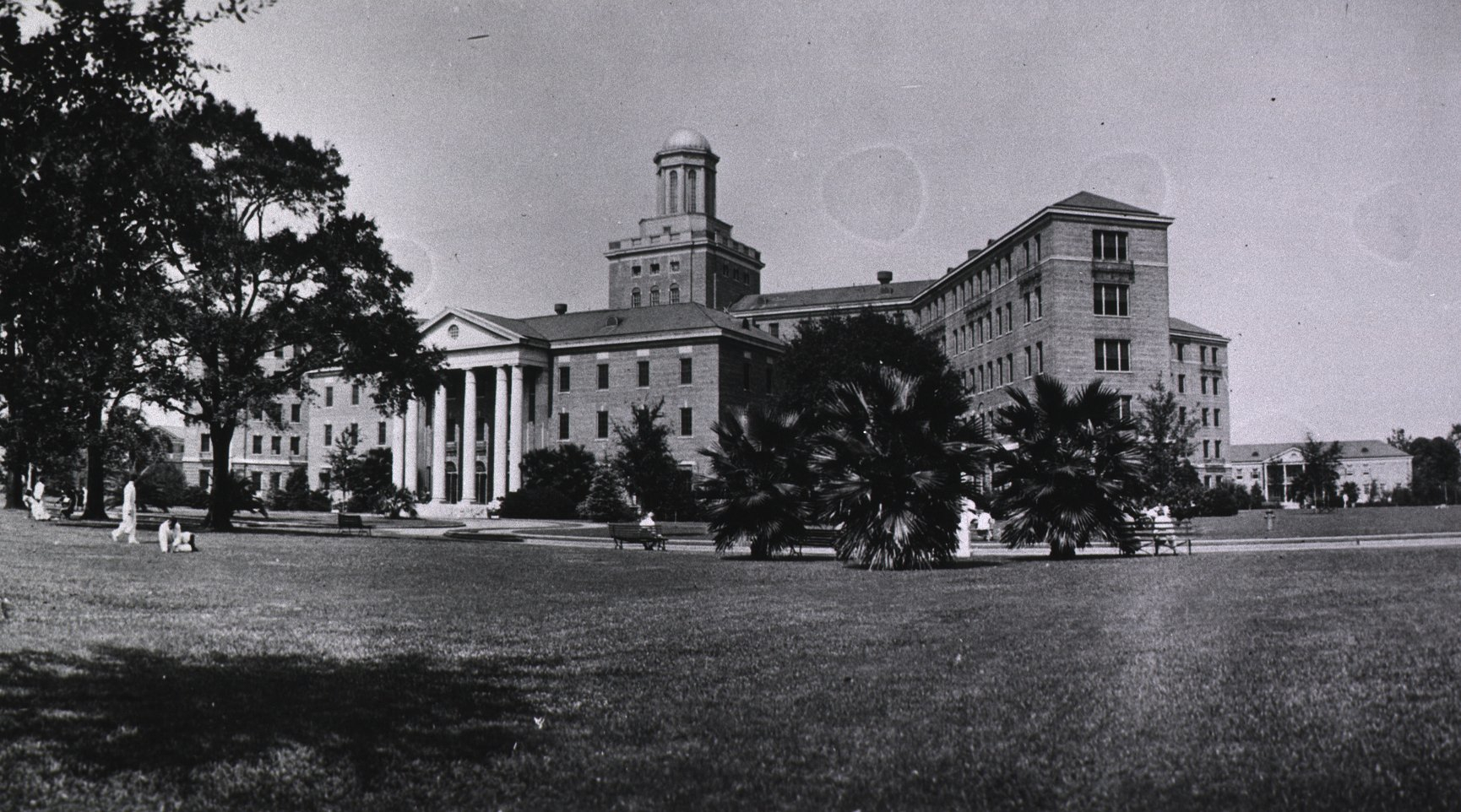
New Orleans PHS Hospital

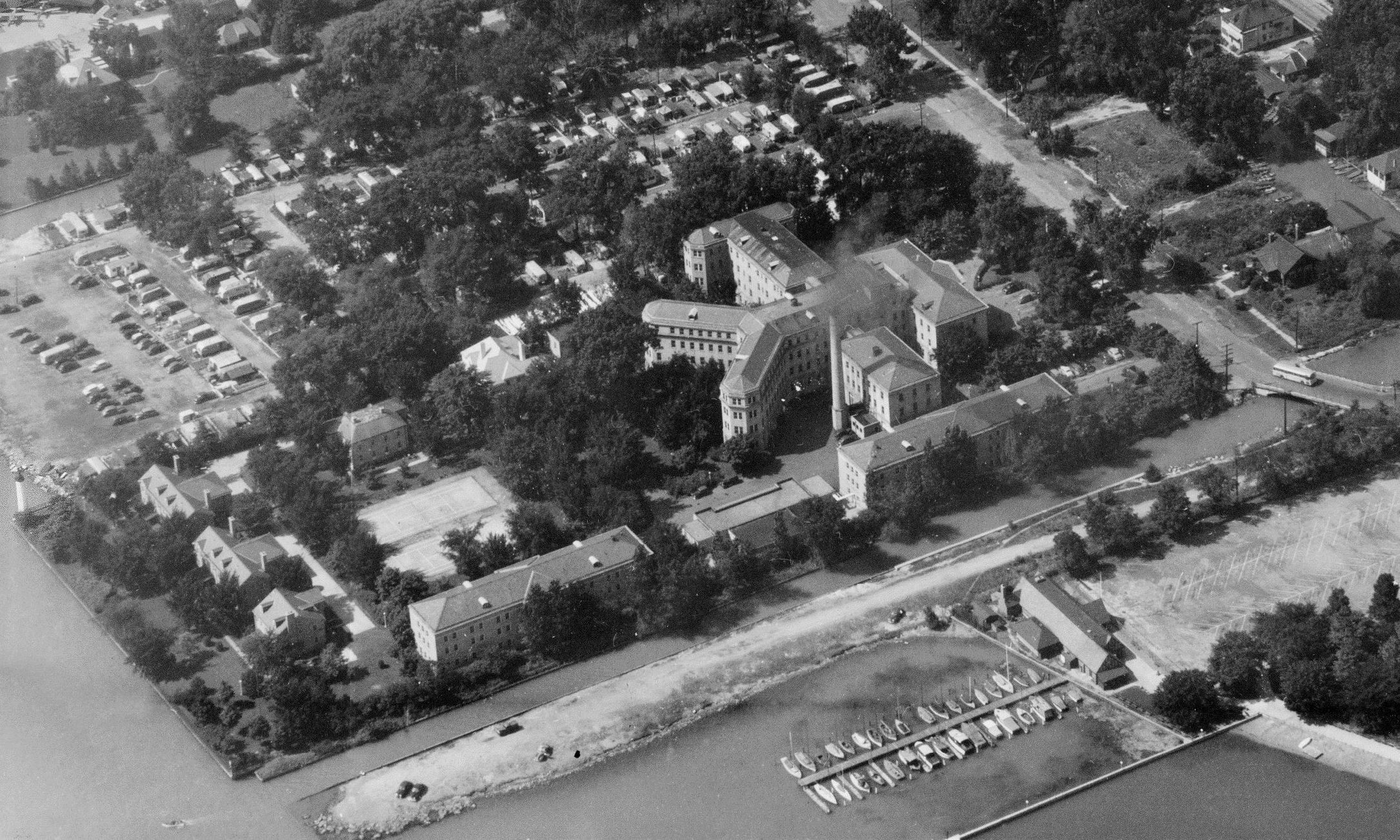
Detroit PHS Hospital

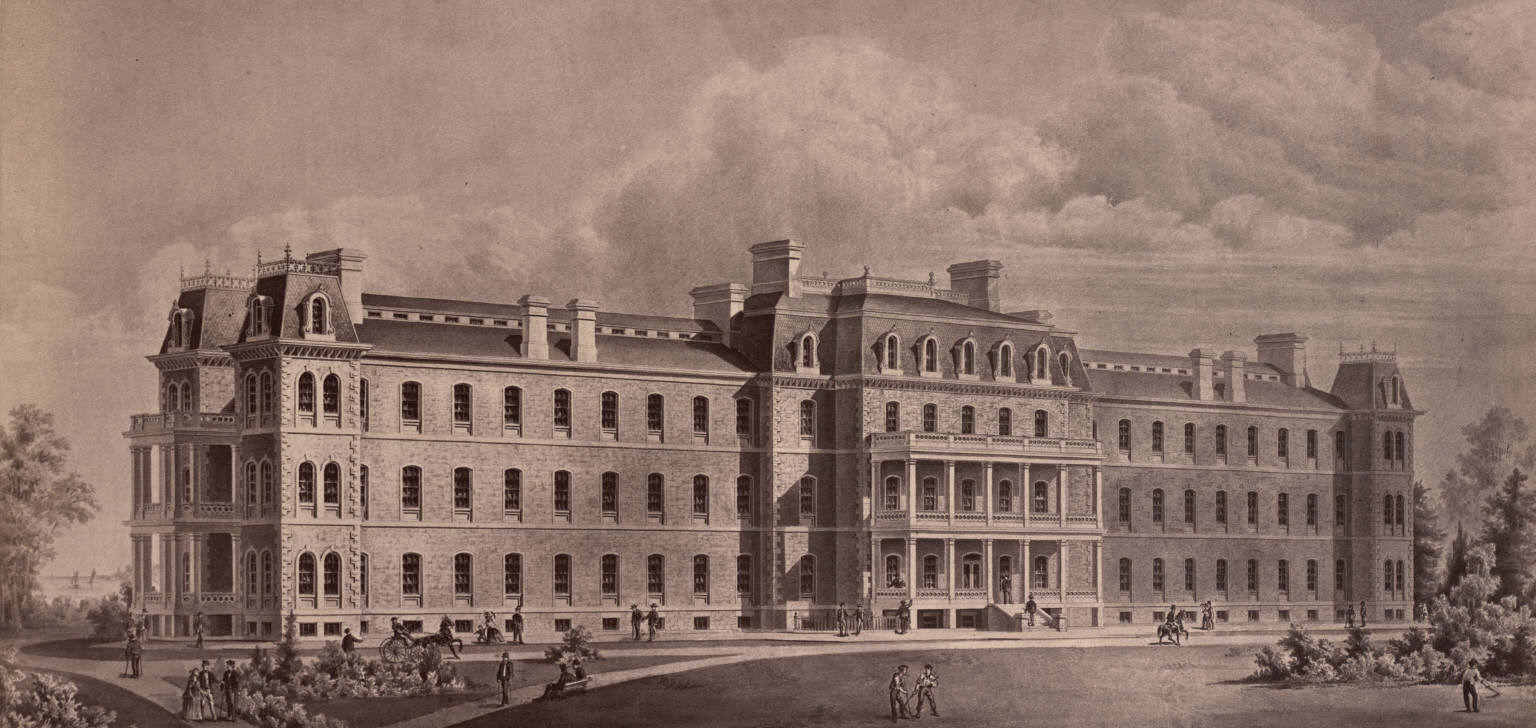
Chicago PHS Hospital

This is a list of Public Health Service hospitals active after 1943. For a list including hospitals that ceased operating prior to 1943, see List of U.S. Marine Hospitals. The links are to the hospital rather than the city. They are grouped by the date that they were closed, transferred to another organization, or downgraded to a clinic.

- 1999:
  - Carville, Louisiana (National Leprosarium)
- 1981:
  - Boston
  - Staten Island
  - Baltimore
  - Norfolk
  - New Orleans
  - Nassau Bay, Texas
  - San Francisco
  - Seattle
- 1965–1970:
  - Savannah
  - Detroit
  - Memphis
  - Chicago
  - Galveston
  - Washington, D.C. (St. Elizabeths Hospital)
  - Lexington (psychiatric hospital)
  - Fort Worth (psychiatric hospital)
- 1944–1953:
  - Washington, D.C. (Freedmen's Hospital)
  - Manhattan Beach, Brooklyn, New York
  - Cleveland
  - Fort Stanton, New Mexico (tuberculosis sanatorium)
  - Kirkwood, Missouri
  - Vineyard Haven, Massachusetts
  - Mobile, Alabama
  - Portland, Maine
  - San Juan, Puerto Rico
  - Ellis Island Immigrant Hospital
  - Neponsit, New York
  - Buffalo
  - Pittsburgh
  - Evansville, Indiana
  - Louisville

== Chiefs ==
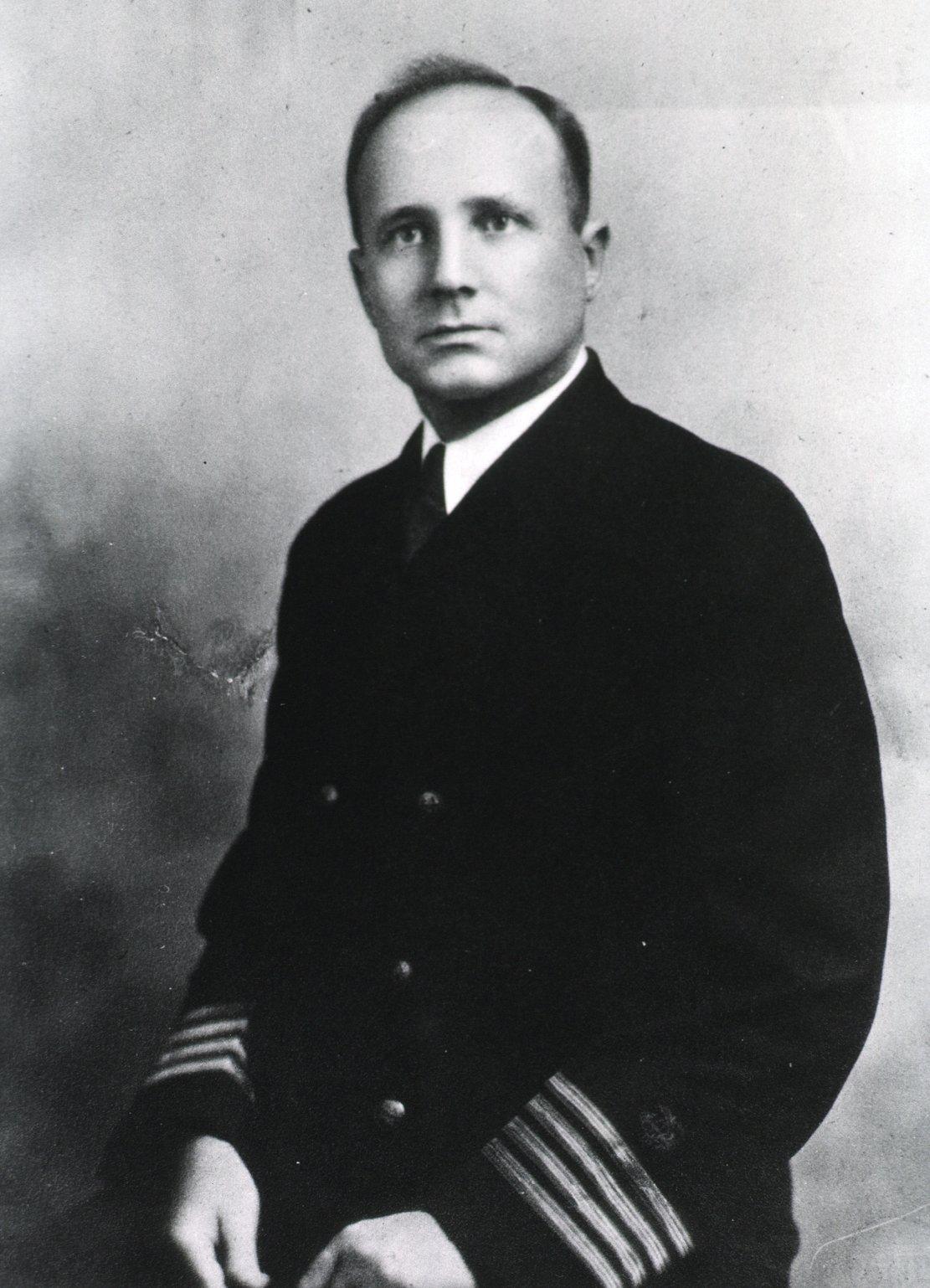
R. C. Williams was the first Chief of the Bureau of Medical Services

The Chief of the Bureau of Medical Services was one of the positions holding the title of Assistant Surgeon General. This list only contains chiefs of the original, operating-agency-level BMS.

- Ralph C. Williams (1943–1951)
- Jack Masur (1951–1956)
- John W. Cronin (1956–1958)
- James V. Lowry (1958–1964)
- Leo J. Gehrig (1964–1965)
- Carruth J. Wagner (1965–1966)
