= Federal Occupational Health =

U.S. government agency

Federal Occupational Health (FOH) is a non-appropriated agency currently within the Program Support Center of the U.S. Department of Health and Human Services. It is the largest provider of occupational health services in the U.S. federal government, providing services exclusively to federal agencies. FOH was previously part of the U.S. Public Health Service from its formation in 1946 until 2001.

== Activities ==
FOH is the largest provider of occupational health services in the U.S. federal government, serving more than 360 federal agencies and reaching 1.8 million federal employees. FOH provides services exclusively to federal agencies including the Department of Defense. It works in partnership with federal organizations nationally and internationally to design and deliver comprehensive occupational health solutions exclusively to federal employees.

It has 300 health centers throughout the U.S. and a network of over 700 private-provider physicians and nurses through which it provides clinical services, including emergency response, physical exams, immunizations, vision and health screenings, and health risk appraisals. It also maintains more than 200 counseling offices in federal buildings as well as a network of affiliate counselors in approximately 1,000 locations across the country.

== History ==
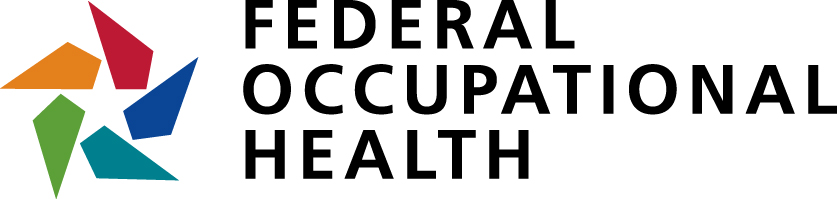
Old official logo of Federal Occupational Health from 2013

Federal Occupational Health's earliest predecessor was created in 1946. The Federal Employee Health Division was established in 1947 within the U.S. Public Health Service (PHS) Bureau of Medical Services. It was absorbed by the Division of Hospitals in 1949, but was split out again in 1966 as the Federal Employee Health Program. After the PHS reorganizations of 1966–1973, it was placed in a different Bureau of Medical Services within the Health Services Administration.

In 1982, a high-level merger of agencies placed the Division of Federal Employee Occupational Health within the Bureau of Community Health Services in the Health Resources and Services Administration (HRSA). As of 1985, it was called the Division of Federal Occupational Health and Beneficiary Health Services. By 1997, the division had been renamed the Division of Federal Occupational Health.

In 2001, Federal Occupational Health was transferred out of HRSA and PHS into the Program Support Center, part of the Office of the Assistant Secretary for Administration.
