= BPHC =

BPHC can refer to:

- Bureau of Primary Health Care
- Boston Public Health Commission
- BITS-Pilani Hyderabad Campus
