= Bureau of Primary Health Care =

- Bureau of Primary Health Care logo

Agency overview
- Formed: 1989
- Preceding agency: Bureau of Health Care Delivery and Assistance
- Jurisdiction: United States Department of Health and Human Services
- Headquarters: Rockville, Maryland, U.S.
- Employees: Approximately 1,400 health centers nationwide
- Annual budget: Funded through the Health Resources and Services Administration (HRSA)
- Agency executives: James Macrae, Associate Administrator; Tonya Bowers, Deputy Associate Administrator
- Parent agency: Health Resources and Services Administration
- Website: bphc.hrsa.gov

The Bureau of Primary Health Care (BPHC) is a part of the Health Resources and Services Administration (HRSA), of the United States Department of Health and Human Services. HRSA helps fund, staff and support a national network of health clinics for people who otherwise would have little or no access to care. BPHC funds health centers in underserved communities, providing access to high quality, family oriented, comprehensive primary and preventive health care for people who are low-income, uninsured or face other obstacles to getting health care.

HRSA is headed by Associate Administrator Jim Macrae and Deputy Associate Administrator Tonya Bowers.

== Programs ==
=== Health Center Program ===
Health centers are community-based and patient-directed organizations that deliver comprehensive, culturally competent, high-quality primary health care services. Health centers also often integrate access to pharmacy, mental health, substance use disorder, and oral health services in areas where economic, geographic, or cultural barriers limit access to affordable health care services. Health centers deliver care to the Nation's most vulnerable individuals and families, including people experiencing homelessness, agricultural workers, residents of public housing, and the Nation's veterans.

Health centers are required to be located in or serve a high-need community (a “medically underserved” area or population) — and to make their services available to all patients on a sliding scale, with fees based on ability to pay. By law, health centers must be governed by community boards with majority patient representation.

The community health center is a nonprofit health care agency concerned with health promotion and primary prevention goals for specific populations. Populations may include the homeless, minorities, Medicaid recipients, migrant/seasonal farmworkers, persons infected with HIV/AIDS, the underinsured, and the uninsured. Community health centers are funded by the Bureau of Primary Health Care, U.S. Public Health Service, U.S. Department of Health and Human Services, via grant money and are located in designated medically underserved areas. The National Association for Community Health Centers and state associations for community health centers are advocates for the local centers. Community health centers are unique in that they employ community health care specialists (e.g., family practice physicians and advanced practice nurses). They provide accessible primary care preventive health services. Their clients include the individual, family, and community; and they have a partnership relationship with the community.

Nearly 1,400 health center grant recipients operate more than 12,000 community-based service delivery sites in every state and territory, giving geographically isolated or economically distressed people access to preventive and primary health care. HRSA-supported health centers treated more than 28 million people in 2019. HRSA-funded health centers provide care to 1 out of every 11 people living in the US, including: 1 in 8 children, 1 in 5 rural residents, 1 in 3 living in poverty, and over 389,000 veterans.

Since 2001, through a major expansion initiative, HRSA has increased access to primary health care in 1,375 communities through new or expanded clinical sites. During this time, health centers increased their patient base by almost 60 percent, nearly doubled the number of people receiving oral health care, and tripled the number of clients who received mental health and addiction counseling services.

Looking at national numbers, Health Centers serve:

- 1 in 11 individuals living in the US,
- 1 in 8 children,
- 1 in 5 rural residents,
- 1 in 3 living in poverty,
- 1 in 5 uninsured,
- over 398,000 veterans,
- 1.4+ million homeless individuals, and
- 1+ million migrant/seasonal farmworkers.

=== Free Clinics Medical Malpractice Program ===
The Federally Supported Health Centers Assistance Act of 1992 and 1995 granted medical malpractice liability protection through the Federal Tort Claims Act (FTCA) to HRSA-supported health centers. BPHC administers this program through its Office of Quality and Data. The Free Clinics Medical Malpractice Program extends this coverage to insures physicians and other clinicians who contribute free health care services in the communities, relieving them of the burden of paying for private liability coverage.

Free clinics play a significant role in meeting the health care needs of the uninsured, particularly at a time when private physicians may be less likely to provide free care in their offices. These clinics are typically small organizations with annual budgets of less than $250,000, making them less able to afford the growing cost of malpractice coverage for those clinicians who might otherwise be willing to donate their time. The Free Clinics Program serves HRSA's overall policy aim of expanding treatment capacity for the disadvantaged by assuring health professional volunteers that they will be protected against medical malpractice claims. To date, over 2,800 health care providers have been given federal indemnity through the program.

=== National Hansen's Disease Program ===
The National Hansen's Disease Program have been providing care and treatment for Hansen's disease (leprosy) and related conditions since 1921. The program provides health care to those affected by the disease through three means of service delivery: at HRSA-run facilities in Louisiana; via a payment to a Hawaii in-patient program; or at any of 11 regional outpatient clinics under contract to the agency. The programs also support scientific research and training for health professionals at the world's largest and most comprehensive laboratory dedicated to Hansen's Disease The programs are the only dedicated source of expertise, treatment and continuing education on the disease in the United States.

Though Hansen's disease is very rare in the United States (there are currently only 6500 cases) there is still a widely held stigma because of the history of the disease. With current treatment methods patients become noninfectious after only a few doses of medication. Patients may continue their lives without change during treatment.

Currently, the National Hansen's Disease (Leprosy) Clinical Center is located at Ochsner Medical Center in Baton Rouge, Louisiana. It is "the only facility in the United States devoted to diagnosis, treatment, and research concerning Hansen's disease." The National Hansen's Disease Program is the major source of direct patient care, clinician training and research in the field of Hansen's Disease and related leprous conditions. The Clinical Center states that it offers:

Free consultations for physicians treating complicated cases of Hansen's disease, including referrals for reconstructive hand or foot surgery.
Free pathologic review of skin biopsy and consultation concerning molecular techniques for identification of M. leprae.
Free antibiotics for leprosy treatment shipped to physicians.
Free educational materials for healthcare professionals and patients to improve understanding of the disease, and to prevent injury and disability.
Surgical care and rehabilitation for those referred for complicated (digit or limb threatening) wounds or reconstruction of correctable deformity resulting from Hansen's disease.

The National Hansen's Disease (Leprosy) Research Program at the Louisiana State University School of Veterinary Medicine in Baton Rouge is a research center that "conducts and supports research in the causes, diagnosis, prevention and cure of Hansen's disease and tuberculosis — aimed at the global elimination of Hansen's disease (leprosy)." The research program maintains the world's only M. leprae-infected armadillo colony. Twenty-three people work at the Research Program.

This Program has led the development of the treatments for Hansen's Disease. It wasn't until the 1940s that any effective means of treating this Disease were created. "Guy Henry Faget, MD and his staff demonstrate the efficacy of sulfone drugs, At the end of one year, 15 of 22 patients had improved."

=== Models that Work Campaign ===
The main objective of the Models That Work Campaign (MTW) is improving access to health care for vulnerable and underserved populations. The MTW Campaign is a collaboration between the Bureau of Primary Health Care (BPHC) and 39 cosponsors including national associations, state and federal agencies, community-based organizations, foundations, and businesses. This initiative gives recognition and visibility to innovative and effective service delivery models. Models are selected based on a set of criteria that includes delivery of high quality primary care services, community participation, integration of health and social services, quantifiable outcomes, and replicability. Winners of the competition are showcased nationally and hired to provide training to other communities, to document and publish their strategies, and to provide onsite technical assistance on request.

MTW staff at HRSA's Bureau of Primary Health Care (BPHC) work in collaboration with cosponsors in national and local campaigns to publicize the innovative approaches used by MTW winners. On the federal level for example, HRSA's HIV/AIDS Bureau works with MTW staff and cosponsors to develop a series of community based workshops with MTW winners; sharing lessons and advising community leaders, clinicians, and administrators on strategies to improve primary care coordination for populations with high incidencesform, perhaps incidence, incidents, or instances was intended of HIV/AIDS. Innovative strategies are often identified and incorporated into federal technical assistance initiatives and local program design as well.

== History ==
=== Predecessors ===
The Bureau of Primary Health Care is the direct descendant of the oldest function of the U.S. Public Health Service (PHS): the system of Marine Hospitals founded in 1798. When the PHS's predecessor, the Marine Hospital Service, first formed internal divisions in 1899, the hospitals became part of the Division of Marine Hospitals and Relief. In 1944, it was renamed the Division of Hospitals.

As part of the PHS reorganizations of 1966–1973, it became part of the Federal Health Programs Service within the short-lived Health Services and Mental Health Administration in 1968. It then became the (second) Bureau of Medical Services within the Health Services Administration in 1973. In 1981, budget cuts imposed by the Reagan administration forced the end of PHS hospital system, with the last eight hospitals transferred to other organizations.

The system of Community Health Centers has a different origin outside of PHS. They have their roots in the Migrant Health Act of 1962, which provided federal support for entities that would later be called health centers, that provided medical and support services for migrant and seasonal farmworkers and their family members; and the Economic Opportunity Act of 1964, which federal funds for two "neighborhood health centers," which were launched in 1965 by Tufts University physicians Jack Geiger and Count Gibson, the first community-based clinics that were to become today's Health Center Program.

These programs were initially part of the Office of Economic Opportunity, until the Nixon administration moved them into the PHS in 1974 as the Bureau of Community Health Services within the Health Services Administration. In the mid-1970s, Congress permanently authorized neighborhood health centers as “community health centers” and “migrant health centers” under sections 329 and 330 of the Public Health Service Act.

=== Formation and later history ===
In 1982, the Health Services Administration merged with the Health Resources Administration to form HRSA. As part of the merge, the Bureau of Medical Services absorbed the Bureau of Community Health Services to form the Bureau of Health Care Delivery and Assistance.

In 1987, the Maternal and Child Health Bureau split from the Bureau of Health Care Delivery and Assistance.

In 1992, the Bureau of Health Care Delivery and Assistance was renamed the Bureau of Primary Health Care. The Bureau of Primary Health Care was reorganized and restructured around 1992 to become more organized and efficient. This resulted in creation of the Office of Minority and Special Populations, the Office of Policy and Program Development, and the Office of Quality and Data. There are also four divisions that were created: Eastern, Central Mid Atlantic, Western and the National Hansen's disease program. The Health Resources and Services Administration (HRSA), within the Department of Health and Human Services (HHS), has the responsibility for managing the Consolidated Health Centers Grant Program.

More recently, the Free Clinics Medical Malpractice Program was established in 2004.
