= Nicole Schupf =

American epidemiologist and neuroscientist

- Title: Professor of Epidemiology

Academic background
- Education: New York University; University of California; Columbia University,

Academic work
- Institutions: Columbia University
- Main interests: Alzheimer's disease, aging in adults with Down syndrome

Nicole Schupf is an American epidemiologist and neuroscientist who is Professor of Epidemiology in Neurology, Psychiatry, the Gertrude H. Sergievsky Center, and the Taub Institute for Research on Alzheimer's Disease and the Aging Brain, Columbia University Faculty of Medicine. She studies aging and Alzheimer's disease in individuals with Down syndrome.

== Education and early career ==
Schupf graduated from Bryn Mawr College in 1964. She received her Ph.D. from New York University in 1970, trained as a physiological psychologist. She worked on neuroimmunological mechanisms in lupus cerebritis for several years before going on to pursue an M.P.H. from the University of California in 1984 and a Dr.P.H. in epidemiology from Columbia University, which she received in 1995.

== Career ==
Schupf is Professor of Epidemiology in Neurology, Psychiatry, the Gertrude H. Sergievsky Center, and the Taub Institute for Research on Alzheimer's Disease and the Aging Brain, Columbia University Faculty of Medicine. She studies aging and Alzheimer's disease (AD) in individuals with Down syndrome (DS), looking at genetic and nongenetic factors that can influence degree of risk or age at onset. She is involved in longitudinal, multidisciplinary work searching for biomarkers that could define the progression of AD in this population. This wide-ranging investigation includes blood-based biomarkers (like beta-amyloid peptides, protein, inflammatory and lipid profiles); measures of amyloid and tau concentration in cerebrospinal fluid; changes detected with neuroimaging; PET studies of brain amyloid uptake; and genetic variations. She has been a major recipient of National Institutes of Health and other federal grant-makers for this research.

== Selected publications ==
- Mayeux, R.; Honig, L. S.; Tang, M.-X.; Manly, J.; Stern, Y.; Schupf, N.; Mehta, P. D. (11 November 2003). "Plasma Aβ40 and Aβ42 and Alzheimer's disease: Relation to age, mortality, and risk". Neurology. 61 (9): 1185–1190. doi:10.1212/01.WNL.0000091890.32140.8F. ISSN 0028-3878. PMID 14610118. S2CID 54663454.
- Manly, Jennifer J.; Tang, Ming-X.; Schupf, Nicole; Stern, Yaakov; Vonsattel, Jean-Paul G.; Mayeux, Richard (2008). "Frequency and course of mild cognitive impairment in a multiethnic community". Annals of Neurology. 63 (4): 494–506. doi:10.1002/ana.21326. ISSN 1531-8249. PMC 2375143. PMID 18300306.
- Kerkel, Kristi; Spadola, Alexandra; Yuan, Eric; Kosek, Jolanta; Jiang, Le; Hod, Eldad; Li, Kerry; Murty, Vundavalli V.; Schupf, Nicole; Vilain, Eric; Morris, Mitzi; Haghighi, Fatemeh; Tycko, Benjamin (July 2008). "Genomic surveys by methylation-sensitive SNP analysis identify sequence-dependent allele-specific DNA methylation". Nature Genetics. 40 (7): 904–908. doi:10.1038/ng.174. ISSN 1546-1718. PMID 18568024. S2CID 10355545.
- Scarmeas, Nikolaos; Stern, Yaakov; Mayeux, Richard; Manly, Jennifer J.; Schupf, Nicole; Luchsinger, Jose A. (1 February 2009). "Mediterranean Diet and Mild Cognitive Impairment". Archives of Neurology. 66 (2): 216–25. doi:10.1001/archneurol.2008.536. ISSN 0003-9942. PMC 2653223. PMID 19204158.
- Scarmeas, Nikolaos; Luchsinger, José; Schupf, Nicole (12 August 2009). "Physical Activity, Diet, and Risk of Alzheimer Disease". JAMA. 302 (6): 627–37. doi:10.1001/jama.2009.1144. ISSN 0098-7484. PMC 2765045. PMID 19671904.

== Personal life ==
Schupf was married to H. Jack Geiger from 1982 until his death in 2020.
