= Count Gibson =

American physician (1921–2002)

- Born: July 10, 1921; Covington, Georgia, US
- Died: July 23, 2002 (aged 81); Hartford, Connecticut, US
- Education: Emory University
- Occupation: Physician
- Employer: Stanford University
- Spouse: Katherine Vislocky (m. 1950)
- Children: 4

Count Dillon Gibson, Jr. (July 10, 1921 – July 23, 2002) was an American physician known for his advocacy in medical civil rights. As a young professor at the Medical College of Virginia, in 1955 he became the first person outside Tuskegee Syphilis Experiments to raise ethical objections to the study. He was on the medical auxiliary committee that supported voting rights workers during Freedom Summer and with one of his collaborators from that project, H. Jack Geiger, in 1965 Gibson cofounded the first community health center in the United States, beginning a network that grew to serve 28 million low-income patients, as of 2020. In 1965 he was chair of the Department of Preventive Medicine at Tufts University Medical School, but moved to the Stanford School of Medicine in 1969 to chair of the Department of Community and Preventive Medicine. He worked in that role until his retirement in 1988.

== Early life ==
Gibson was born in Covington, Georgia, on July 10, 1921, to Count Dillon Gibson Sr. and Julia Thompson Gibson. The family moved to Atlanta in 1933 when his father joined the faculty of Georgia Technical Institute as Professor of Geology. Gibson attended college and medical school at Emory University in Georgia, earning a BS in 1942 and an MD in 1944.

From 1947, Dorothy Day and the Catholic Worker Movement were early influences on Gibson, who admired the non-violent social activism.

== Career ==
Gibson began his medical residency in New York but then from 1945 to 1947 served in the U.S. Army Medical Corps. He was chief of laboratory service in the 110th Station Hospital in Vienna, Austria.

Gibson returned to New York to complete his residency at Columbia-Presbyterian Medical Center. In 1951, he took a position at the Medical College of Virginia, researching infectious disease and in particular the use of antibiotics. In 1955, as an associate professor, Gibson heard a former Emory colleague, Sidney Olansky, speak about the ongoing Tuskegee Syphilis Experiments (1932 to 1972). Gibson read what the study had published to that point and then wrote to Olansky, becoming the first person outside the United States Public Health Service (which was conducting the experiment) to voice objections to the project. He questioned the "ethics of the entire program" as it appeared to him (as was in fact the case) that study participants did not know treatment was being withheld. Moreover, he said, "It seems to me that the continued observation of an ignorant individual suffering with a chronic disease for which therapeutic measures are available, cannot be justified on the basis of any accepted moral standard." But he was warned to stay away from the issue by more senior members of the Medical College of Virginia and did not pursue it further.

In 1958 he left Virginia to become chair of the Department of Preventative Medicine at Tufts University Medical School.

In 1964, Gibson was one of the medical professionals on the Medical Committee for Human Rights, traveling to Mississippi during the Freedom Summer to provide medical aid to civil rights workers in the voter registration drive. Gibson joined Martin Luther King Jr.'s March from Selma to Montgomery.

In 1965, Gibson cofounded the first community health center in the United States at Columbia Point, Boston. He served as director of the clinic for four years and, working with H. Jack Geiger (who had also been on the Medical Committee during Freedom Summer), Gibson went on to found similar clinics in the Mississippi Delta and the San Joaquin Valley, California, organized on the principle of treating medical concerns in their social and cultural context. This grew into a national network of clinics serving 28 million low-income people as 2020. The original Boston clinic was renamed the Geiger-Gibson Health Center in the 1990s.

In 1965 and 1966, Gibson was a delegate to the White House Conferences on Health and on Civil Rights, respectively.

From 1969 until he retired in 1988, Gibson was professor and chair of the Department of Community and Preventive Medicine (later called the Department of Health Research and Policy) at Stanford School of Medicine. At Stanford he continued to pursue the interdisciplinary approaches to treating health in social context that drove the community health clinic model, engaging not only physicians but also economists, sociologists, statisticians and epidemiologists to work together on challenges in medical care. In 1972, he launched the Interdepartmental Program in Health Services Administration with Nicholas Baloff, a professor at Stanford’s Graduate School of Business (this became the Interdisciplinary Program in Health Services Research). In 1978, Count and Professor William Fowkes organized the Division of Family Medicine.

In California more broadly, he was a supporter of farmworkers' advocate Cesar Chavez as well as Native American activists in the Bay Area. In 1969 Native college students occupied Alcatraz Island for several months to raise awareness of Indian issues and Gibson went to the island to give the students medical care, one of the only non-Native people they allowed in. He founded community health centers in the model he had helped establish, including the Native American Health Center in San Francisco and the Charles Drew Medical Center in East Palo Alto.

== Personal life ==
Gibson was a polyglot, speaking Russian, German, Latin and French, as well as studying Spanish, Italian, Dutch and American Sign Language. Shortly before being stationed in Vienna, he converted to Roman Catholicism, but his interest in Russian, fueled by his encounters in Austria with Russian refugees, led him to the Byzantine Church, where he became a devout member. This also introduced him to Katherine Vislocky, daughter of a priest serving Saint Mary's Ruthenian Greek Catholic Church in Manhattan, and they married in 1950. The couple had four children.

After living in California for 30 years, they moved in retirement to West Hartford, Connecticut, in 1999. Vislocky died on February 21, 2002. Gibson died five months later, on July 23, 2002, in Hartford, Connecticut, after a stroke. He was 81.
