= H. Jack Geiger =

American physician and civil rights activist (1925–2020)

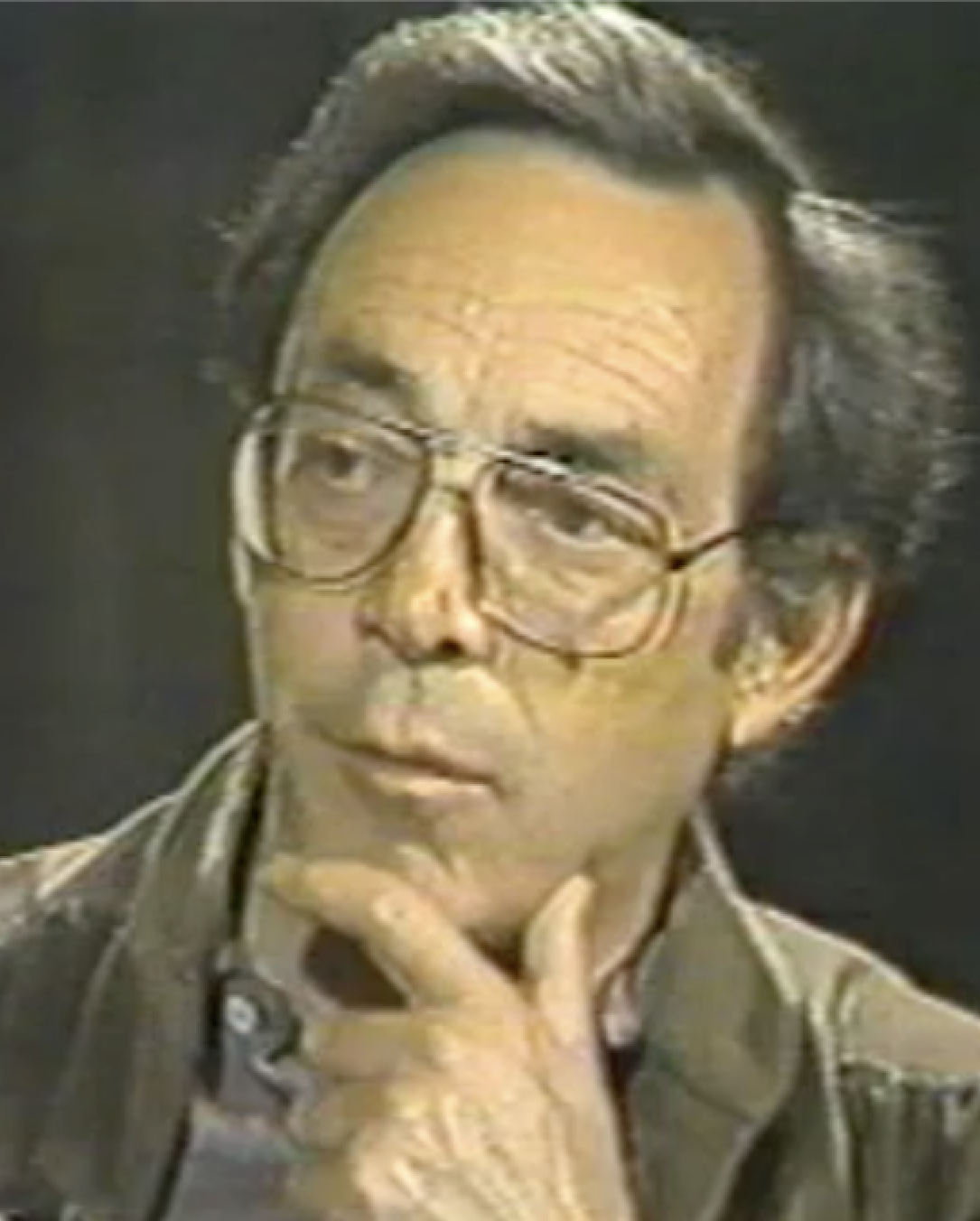
- Born: Herman J. Geiger; November 11, 1925; Manhattan, New York City, New York, U.S.
- Died: December 28, 2020 (aged 95); Brooklyn, New York City, New York, U.S.
- Education: University of Wisconsin; Case Western Reserve University School of Medicine
- Occupations: Physician, civil rights activist
- Employer: City University of New York School of Medicine
- Organization(s): Physicians for Social Responsibility; Physicians for Human Rights
- Known for: Social medicine Community health centers
- Title: Arthur C. Logan Professor of Community Medicine

Herman J. Geiger (November 11, 1925 – December 28, 2020), known as H. Jack Geiger, was an American medical doctor and civil rights activist. He was a leader in the field of social medicine, the philosophy that doctors had a responsibility to treat the social as well as medical conditions that adversely affected patients' health, famously (and controversially) writing prescriptions for food for impoverished patients with malnutrition. Geiger came to embody the idea of the responsibility of a physician to do something about what is now known as the social determinants of health, believing that medicine could be an instrument of social change. He served patients' medical needs as well as social and economic necessities, which he believed were in large part responsible for the health problems communities faced. He was one of the doctors to bring the community health center model to the United States, starting a network that serves 28 million low-income patients as of 2020.

The Arthur C. Logan Professor of Community Medicine at the City University of New York School of Medicine, Geiger was a cofounder and president of Physicians for Human Rights as well as a cofounder and president of Physicians for Social Responsibility, each of which won Nobel Peace Prizes.

== Early life, family and education ==
Herman J. Geiger, called Jack, was born in Manhattan, New York City, New York, on November 11, 1925. His parents, a doctor (Jacob) and a microbiologist (Virginia Lowenstein), were both Jewish immigrants, from Austria and Germany respectively. They raised "Jackie" and his sister on Manhattan's Upper West Side, with European relatives fleeing the Nazis often staying in the Geiger home after arrival in the United States.

Geiger rapidly skipped grades in public school and, as a result, graduated from Townsend Harris High School at the age of 14. Not yet old enough to enroll in college, he landed a job as a copy boy at The New York Times. A jazz fan, he often went out at night to visit Harlem's jazz clubs (to his parents' displeasure).

In 1940, Geiger ran away from home and went to the Sugar Hill, Harlem home of Canada Lee, as Geiger later recounted on This American Life. He had met the African American actor backstage at a Broadway production of Native Son. Lee agreed to take Geiger in and Geiger stayed for over a year (with the consent of Geiger's parents). Lee took on the role of surrogate father. During his time with Lee, Geiger was introduced to people like Langston Hughes, Billy Strayhorn, Richard Wright, Adam Clayton Powell, Orson Welles, Paul Robeson, and William Saroyan. Geiger heard African American visitors to Lee's home recount their experiences of racism. The treatment of African American troops in the South at this time made a particular impression on Geiger.

With the help of a loan from Lee, Geiger enrolled at the University of Wisconsin in 1941. At night he worked at The Madison Capitol Times newspaper, though still under 18, Geiger had to acquire a special exemption from Madison's curfew for minors.

In 1942, Geiger joined A. Philip Randolph and Bayard Rustin who were planning a march on Washington in protest of racial discrimination in the defense factories for World War II; they succeeded in pressuring President Franklin D. Roosevelt to take measures against this without going through with the march. In 1943, Geiger met James Farmer, the founder of the Congress of Racial Equality (CORE), which prompted Geiger to start a CORE chapter in Madison, one of the earliest chapters.

As a part of CORE, Geiger took part in a variety of efforts to push the civil rights agenda. Among them, he took an active part in efforts to integrate housing and restaurants. In an interview with the Smithsonian Institution's National Museum of African American History & Culture and the Library of Congress, Geiger recounted how he, along with his interracial team of CORE members, would go into restaurants and get asked to leave because they refused to serve Black customers. They would then begin a sit-in and go around the restaurant explaining the situation and inviting other customers to join in their effort.

In 1943, Geiger turned 18 and left school to join the war effort, enlisting with the merchant marine because it was the only racially integrated military service at the time. He worked on the only ship in World War II with an African American captain, Hugh Mulzac, on the SS Booker T. Washington.

Geiger was discharged in 1947 and enrolled at the University of Chicago to pursue pre-med studies, but where he also encountered significant anti-Black discrimination. He organized a strike, with two thousand faculty and students protesting issues like the exclusion of African American patients from certain hospitals and the rejection of qualified African American applicants to the medical school. As a part of the campus chapter of the American Veteran Committee (AVC), Geiger discovered that the University of Chicago Hospital had been denying black patients. Specifically, the maternity hospital had a strict policy that no black mother could have their baby delivered there. Instead, he recognized that many university hospitals, including the University of Chicago at the time, had been finding ways to exclude black patients and redirect them towards a black-run hospital, Provident Hospital, located in the South Side of Chicago. Geiger also discovered the discrimination in the Medical School Admissions Committee, finding that the records for the minutes of admissions meetings specifically talked about black applicants being qualified but not accepting them because they were "not ready to have a black student at this time". After many unsuccessful attempts to bring attention to the issues, Geiger and the AVC planned a protest that took place on December 7, 1947. For his "extracurricular" activities, he was blackballed by the American Medical Association and returned to working in journalism, unable to gain entrance to medical school. Working as a science journalist, he was active in efforts to use science in the service of human needs.

After five years in journalism, Geiger secured an assignment that allowed him to approach medical school deans. Jack Caughey of Case Western Reserve University School of Medicine was encouraging and Geiger successfully enrolled in 1954. While in medical school, a Rockefeller grant allowed him to spend five months working in Pholela, South Africa, at a health clinic that also invested in other local improvements—latrines, vegetable gardens, feeding programs—and succeeded thanks significantly to local staff members engagement with the community this way. It was during his time in medical school, when he spent time in a rural area of South Africa called Pholela, where Geiger was first introduced to the idea of social medicine. He trained under physicians Sydney and Emily Kark who had implemented the idea of community oriented primary care in the Pholela Community Health Centre (PCHC). This system entailed the concept that medicine could both attend to the physical ills of the people in those communities but also the structural problems that affected health, like poverty for example. During his time in Pholela, there was a significant decrease in many health metrics including infant mortality, malnutrition, and infectious diseases. Geiger participated in and saw the completion of pit latrines, vegetable gardens, and food programs. It was this model of healthcare he found in PCHC which later inspired his creation of community health centers in Mississippi in the 1960s. The experience spurred an interest in working in international health. Geiger received his M.D. from Case Western in 1958.

== Medical career and activism ==
"The last time I checked my textbooks, the specific therapy for malnutrition was, in fact, food."

— Dr. H. Jack Geiger, 1965

Geiger next trained in internal medicine at Harvard, working at Boston City Hospital from 1958 to 1964. During this time, he also earned a master's degree in epidemiology from the Harvard School of Public Health, and was a fellow at Harvard University's Research Training Program in Social Science and Medicine.

In 1961, Geiger co-founded Physicians for Social Responsibility (PSR), which argued that the U.S. government was understating the extent of destruction a nuclear war would cause. He conducted what he called "the bombing run" at PSR's public presentations, detailing the devastation that a one megaton nuclear bomb would inflict on the city hosting the meeting. Geiger coauthored one of the first papers to estimate the medical toll of nuclear warfare, which was published in The New England Journal of Medicine in May 1962, just months before the Cuban Missile Crisis brought the country to the brink of nuclear war. Taking Boston as a case study, the paper predicted that a nuclear exchange would leave millions dead and injured, vastly outstripping the hospital capacity that would remain to treat those who had (initially) survived. The article argued that physicians needed to consider "the prevention of thermonuclear war" as a relevant part of preventive medicine. PSR would be awarded a Nobel Peace Prize in 1985 for its contributions to the nuclear disarmament effort.

In 1964, Geiger participated in the Freedom Summer voting rights campaign, serving as the field coordinator of a group of health care workers called the Medical Committee for Human Rights, who went to Mississippi to care for the civil rights activists who had gathered there from other parts of the country. In 1965, Geiger again organized medical care for participants in the Selma to Montgomery voting rights march led by Martin Luther King Jr..

While working in the South, Geiger found that many African Americans were living in conditions strikingly similar to the extreme poverty he had seen in apartheid South Africa, and realized that the health disparities abroad that he wanted to address also existed much closer to home. President Lyndon B. Johnson's Office of Economic Opportunity (part of the War on Poverty), along with grants from Tufts University, afforded Geiger and two other doctors, John Hatch and Count Gibson, the opportunity to set up a clinic in Mound Bayou, Mississippi, which they modeled on the one Geiger had seen in South Africa: not only treating sick patients, but also spending grant money digging wells and privies, establishing a library, and a variety of other social, educational and economic services. Geiger wrote controversial prescriptions for food, paid out of the pharmacy budget, which drew the displeasure of the state's Governor. Geiger replied:

"Yeah, well, the last time I looked in my medical textbooks, they said the specific therapy for malnutrition was food."

The Mound Bayou clinic, called the Delta Health Center, and a similar center in Columbia Point, Boston, became national models of care via community health centers, and grew into networks of clinics. As of 2020, the networks encompassed more than 1,300 clinics at more than 9000 sites, and served about 28 million low-income patients.

From 1968 to 1971, Geiger was chair of the Department of Community Medicine at Tufts University School of Medicine, then visiting professor of medicine at Harvard Medical School in 1972–73. For the following five years, he was Chair of the Department of Community Medicine at the State University of New York at Stonybrook School of Medicine, then in 1978, he joined the faculty at the City University of New York Medical School as a professor of community medicine. Geiger was the founding chair of the school's Department of Community Health and Social Medicine (CHASM), from 1978 until he took emeritus status in 1996. In the interim he was also promoted to Arthur C. Logan Professor of Community Medicine.

In 1986, Geiger was a cofounder (and later president) of Physicians for Human Rights (PHR), which shared in the Nobel Peace Prize in 1997 for its contributions to the effort to ban land mines. The group applied medical skills to the investigation of human rights abuses and offered medical and humanitarian aid to survivors of such abuses. Geiger participated in human rights missions for PHR, the United Nations, and the American Association for the Advancement of Science to former Yugoslavia, Iraq and Kurdistan, the West Bank and Gaza Strip, and South Africa.

He was also a cofounder and president of the Committee for Health in South Africa and a cofounder and national program coordinator of the Medical Committee for Human Rights.

== Honors ==
In 1973, Geiger received the first Award for Excellence of the American Public Health Association for "exceptionally meritorious achievement in improving the health of the American people". In 1982, he received Award of Merit in Global Public Health from the Public Health Association of New York.

In 1993, Geiger was elected to the Institute of Medicine (IOM), United States National Academy of Sciences. In 1998, he received the IOM's highest honor, the Lienhardt Award for "outstanding contributions to minority health". In 1998 he also received the American Public Health Association's Sedgewick Memorial Medal for Distinguished Service in Public Health. He also won the 2014 Frank A. Calderone Prize, public health's highest honor, for foundational work demonstrating the interrelation of health and human rights throughout his career.

In recognition of Geiger's pathbreaking work on discrimination in health care, the Congressional Black, Hispanic, and Asian American Caucuses founded the H. Jack Geiger Congressional Fellowships on Health Disparities to support young minority scholars.

Geiger received an honorary degree from Case Western in 2000 as well as an honorary doctorate of science from State University of New York.

== Personal life ==
In 1951, Geiger married Mary Battle, a health care administrator; they divorced in 1968. In 1982, he married Nicole Schupf, a neuroscience and epidemiology professor at Columbia University.

He died on December 28, 2020, at age 95, at his home in Brooklyn, New York City.

== Works ==
- Sidel, V. W.; Geiger, H. J.; Lown, B. (May 31, 1962). "The medical consequences of thermonuclear war: II. The physician's role in the post-attack period". The New England Journal of Medicine. 266: 1137–1145. doi:10.1056/NEJM196205312662205. ISSN 0028-4793. PMID 13912536.
- Geiger, H. J. (1996). "A life in social medicine". In E. L. Bassuk (ed.). The Doctor-activist: physicians fighting for social change. New York: Plenum Press.
- Geiger, H. Jack (November 2002). "Community-Oriented Primary Care: A Path to Community Development". American Journal of Public Health. 92 (11): 1713–16. doi:10.2105/ajph.92.11.1713. ISSN 0090-0036. PMC 3221474. PMID 12406790.
