= Public Health Service Hospital (San Francisco) =

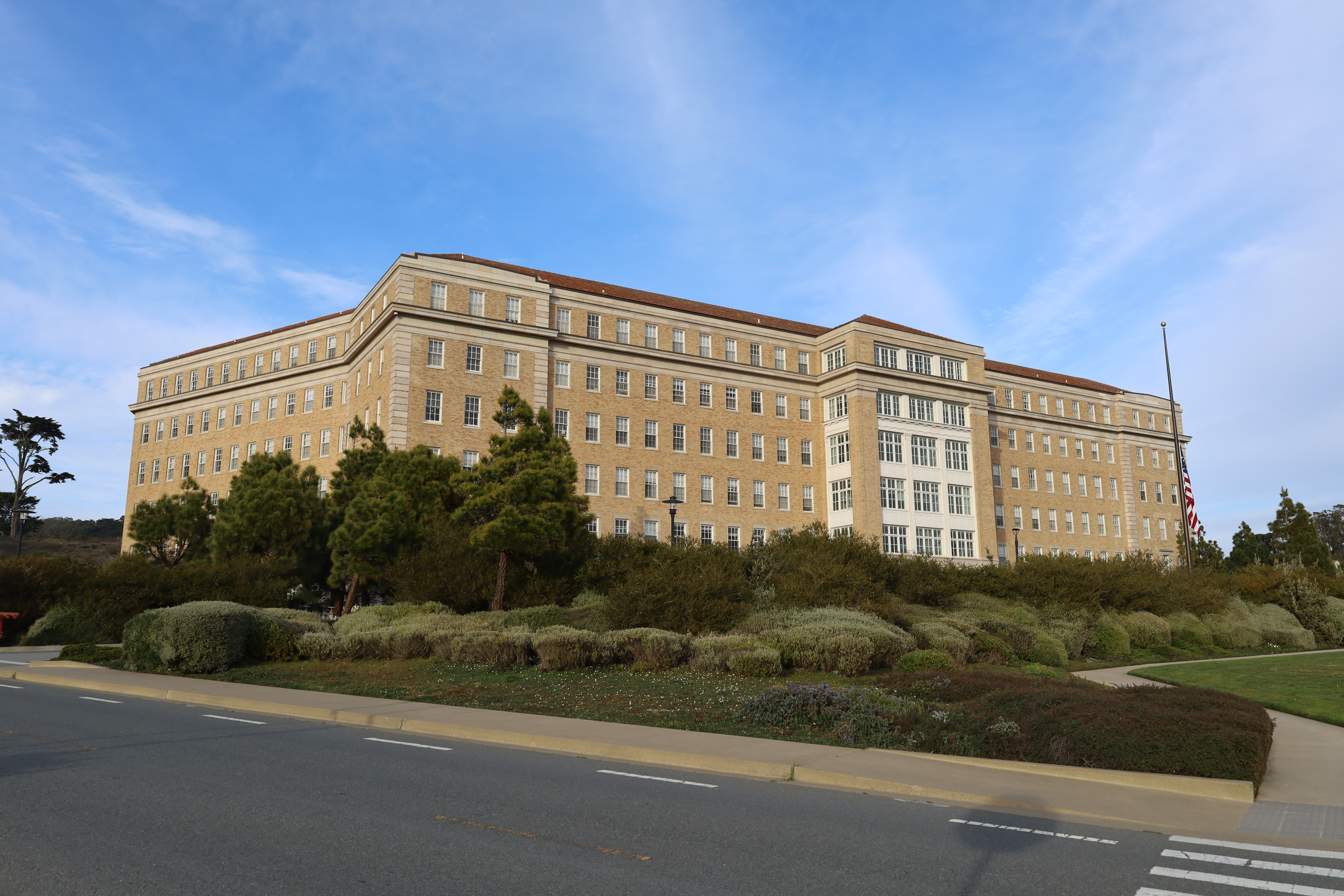
- The former hospital main building, now the Presidio Landmark apartments, in 2025

Geography
- Location: 1801 Wedemeyer Street, San Francisco Presidio, San Francisco, California, United States
- Coordinates: 37°47′14″N 122°28′23″W

Services
- Beds: 500 (in 1853)

History
- Former names: San Francisco Marine Hospital, U.S. Marine Hospital
- Founded: 1853
- Closed: 1981

Links
- Website: www.presidio.gov/trust/projects/phsh/
- Lists: Hospitals in California

The Public Health Service Hospital (PHSH) is a defunct hospital located in the Presidio of San Francisco, it was in operation (in this name) from 1912 to 1981. The precursor hospital was the San Francisco Marine Hospital, established in 1853, and renamed in 1912. The building for the Public Health Service Hospital was erected in 1931 or 1932, and in 2010 the building was converted into a residential apartment building.

== History ==
=== Rincon Point ===
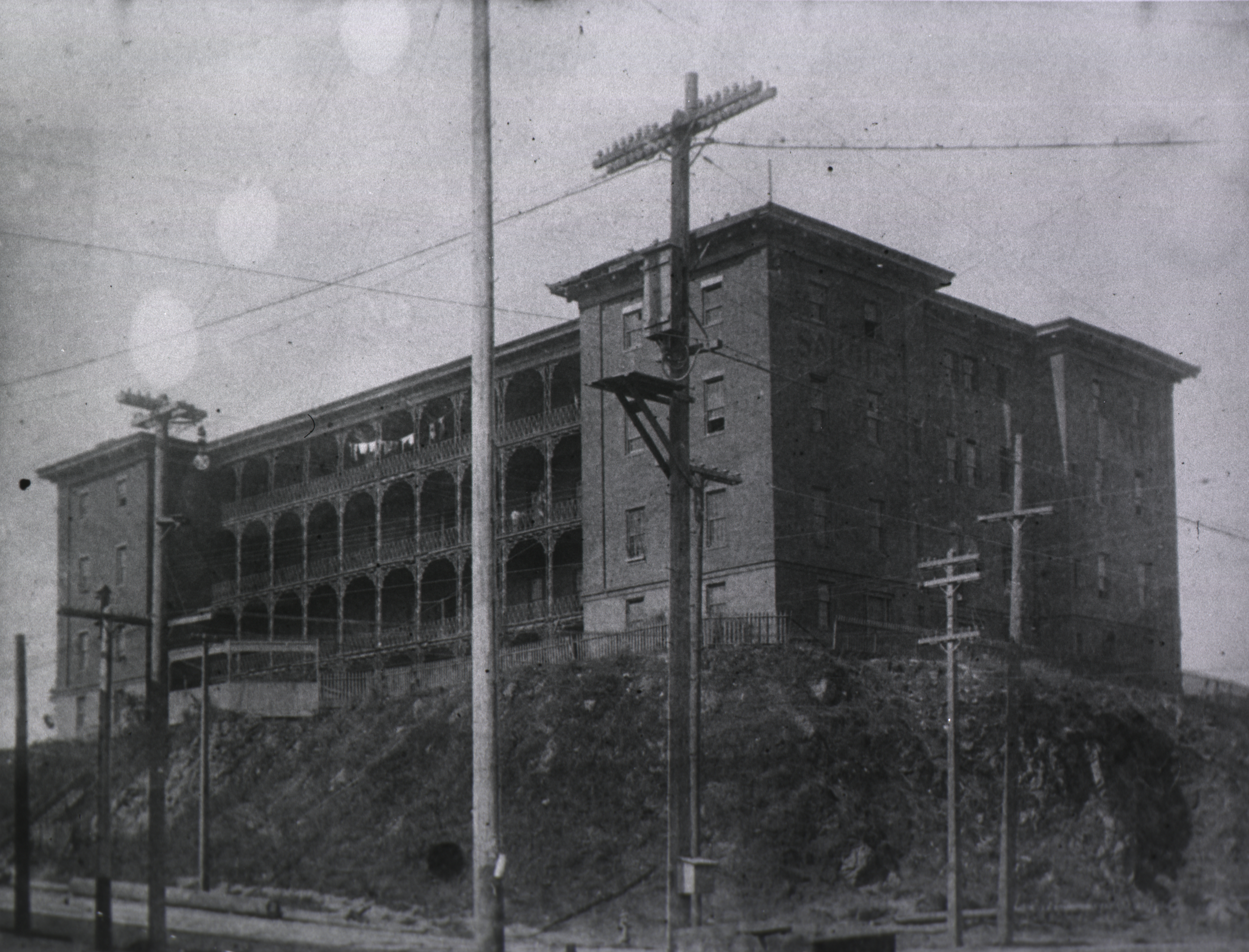
The original Marine Hospital building at Rincon Point in 1897

In 1851, United States Congress established the hospital as the San Francisco Marine Hospital (also known as the U.S. Marine Hospital, San Francisco). The Marine Hospital Service was an organization of Marine Hospitals dedicated to the care of ill and disabled seamen in the United States Merchant Marine, the United States Coast Guard, and other federal beneficiaries.

The building was completed in 1853, and had 500 beds at the time of opening. The first location was at Rincon Point in 1853; it was damaged by the 1868 Hayward earthquake and abandoned.

=== Presidio campus ===
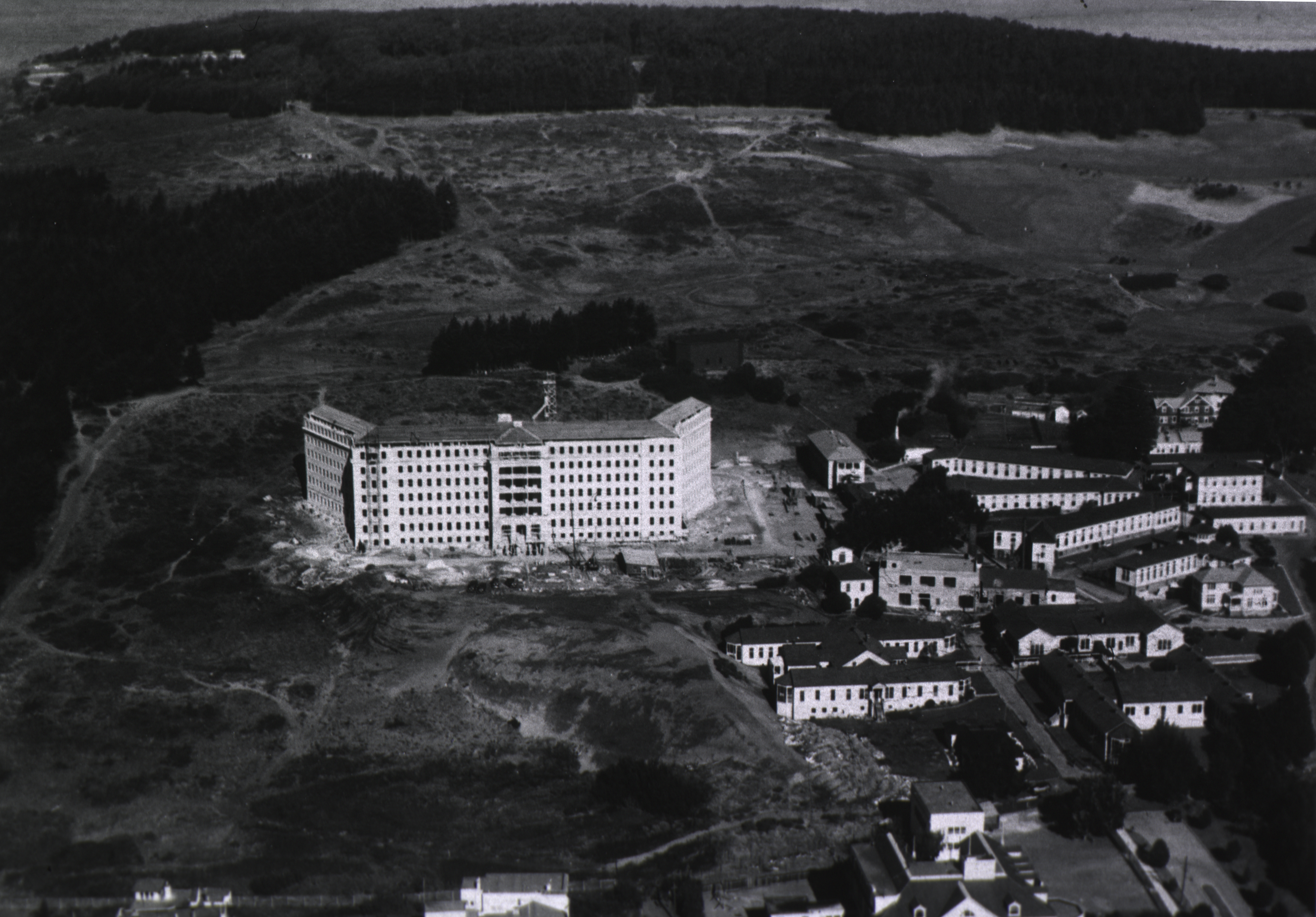
Construction of the current building in the early 1930s. The wards of the old hospital, soon to be demolished, are visible at right.

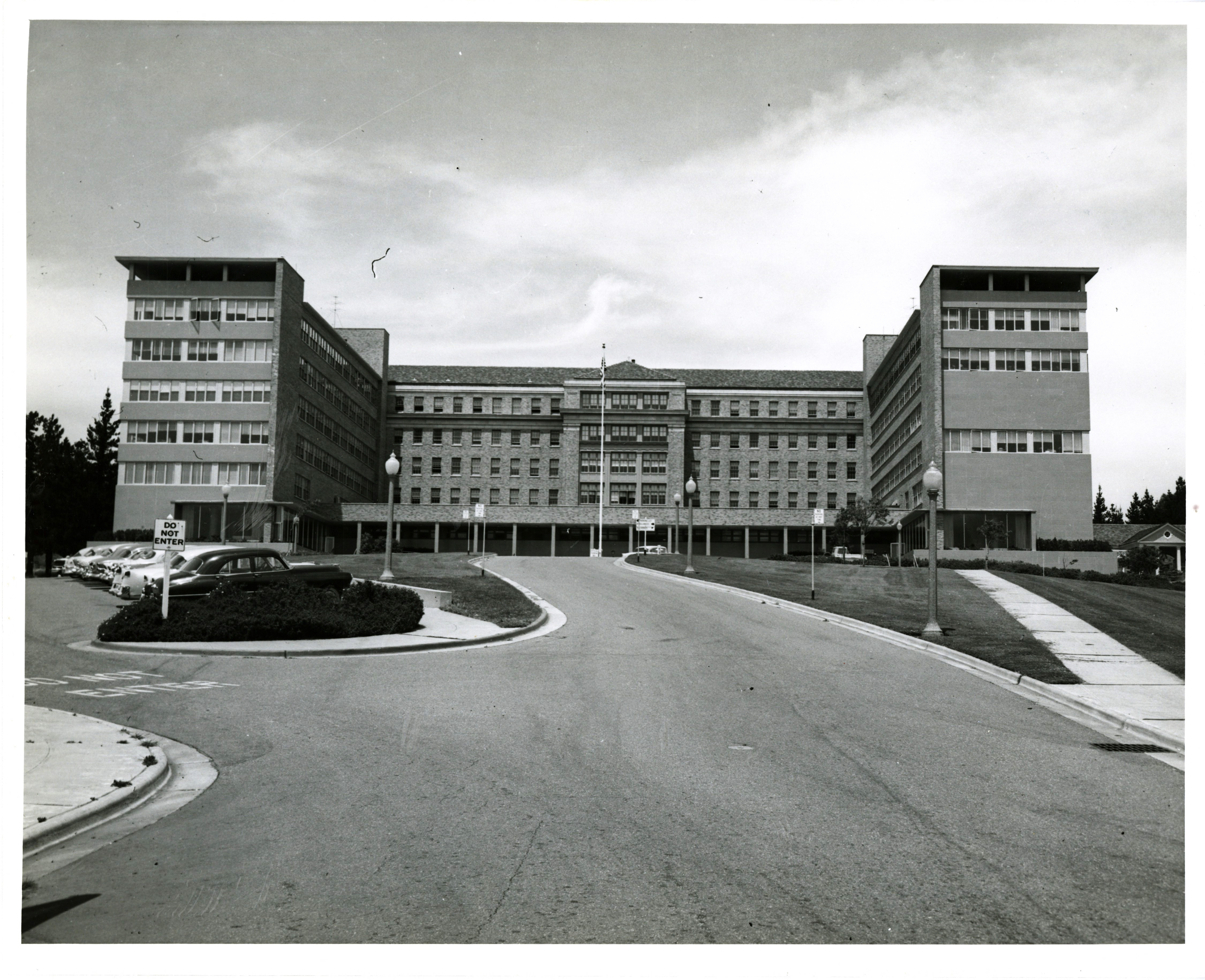
The hospital building with the wings added in the 1950s

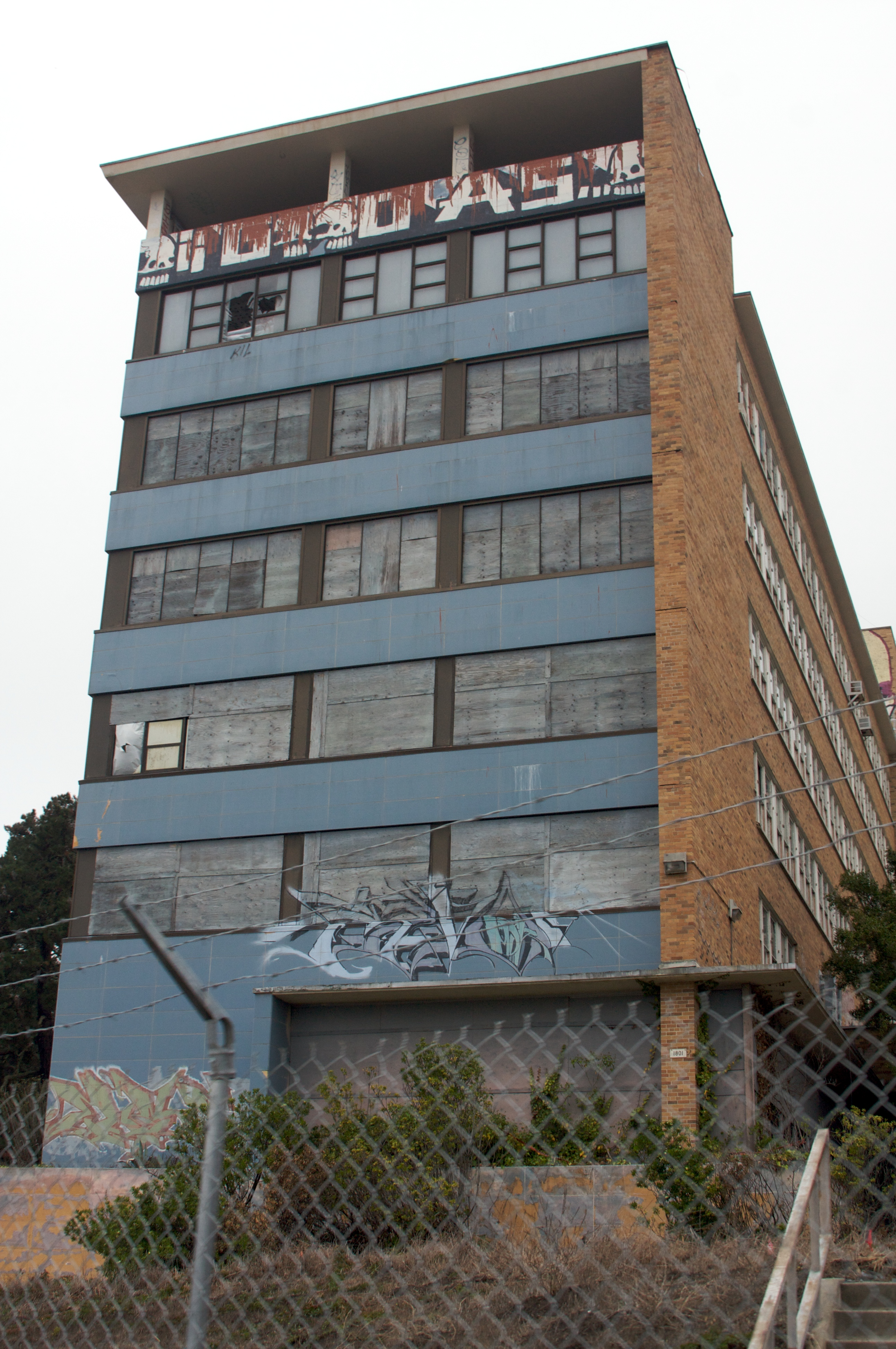
The abandoned West Wing (now demolished) in 2008

A new building on the Presidio of San Francisco opened in 1875. A cemetery associated with the San Francisco Marine Hospital at the Presidio was actively used from approximately 1881 to 1912, and (as of 2006) the remains of the cemetery were still partially visible.

All of the Marine Hospital Service facilities nationwide evolved into part of the United States Public Health Service agency and the San Francisco Marine Hospital was renamed Public Health Service Hospital in 1912.

The current building opened in 1932. Two wings were added in the 1950s, which were later demolished in 2009. In 1981, the Public Health Service Hospital shut down because of budget cuts.

Between 1982 and 1988, the buildings housed the San Francisco branch of the Defense Language Institute. It was closed in December 1988, and all remaining students were moved to Monterey, with plans to sell the hospital to the city of San Francisco. In the following years, the building remained empty, and became popular with squatters, graffiti artists and ghost hunters who were attracted by the allegedly haunted former morgue and operating rooms.

The historic 1932 modernist building was converted and rehabilitated for housing, and opened in 2010 as the Presidio Landmark apartments.

== Gallery ==
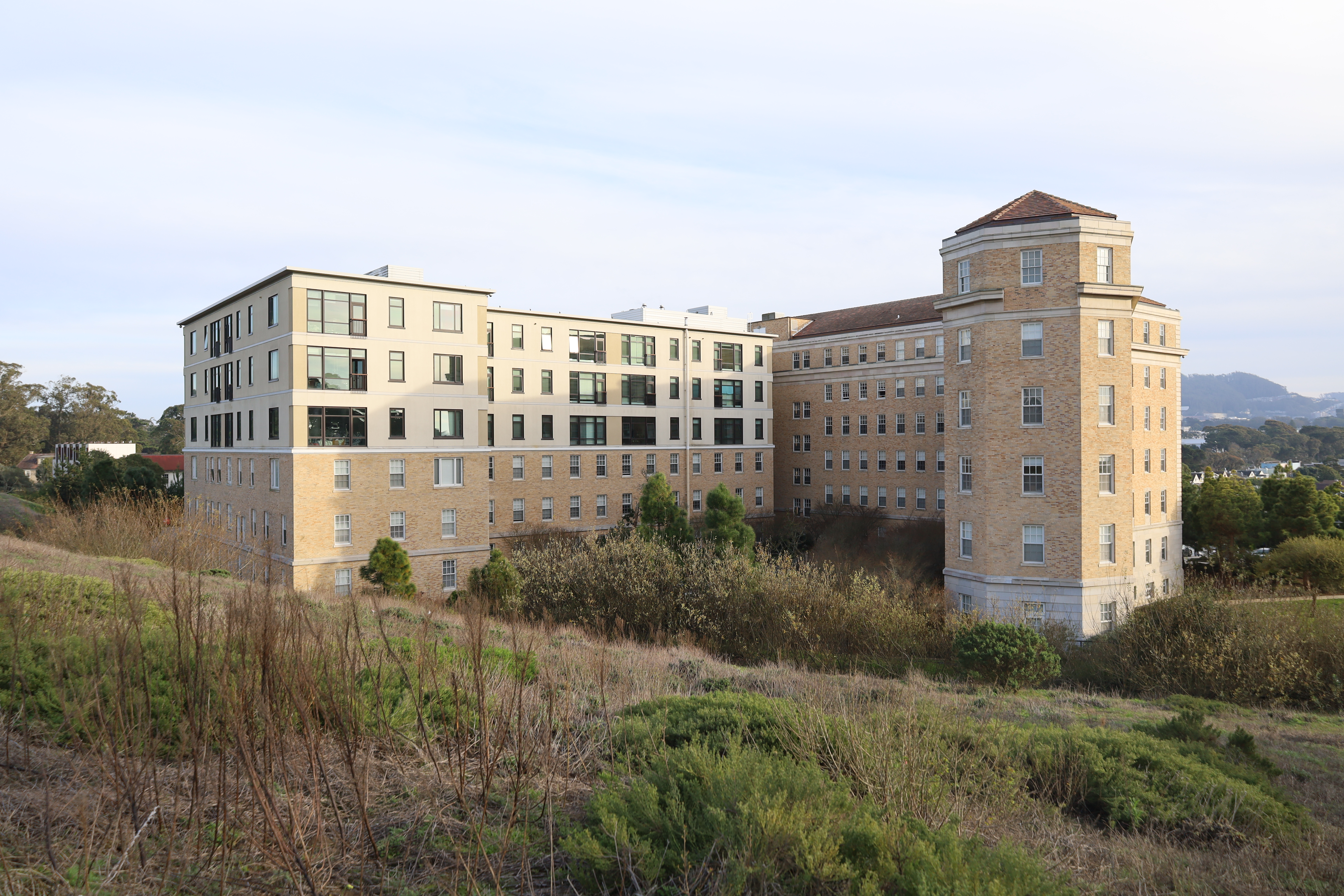
Rear of the main building

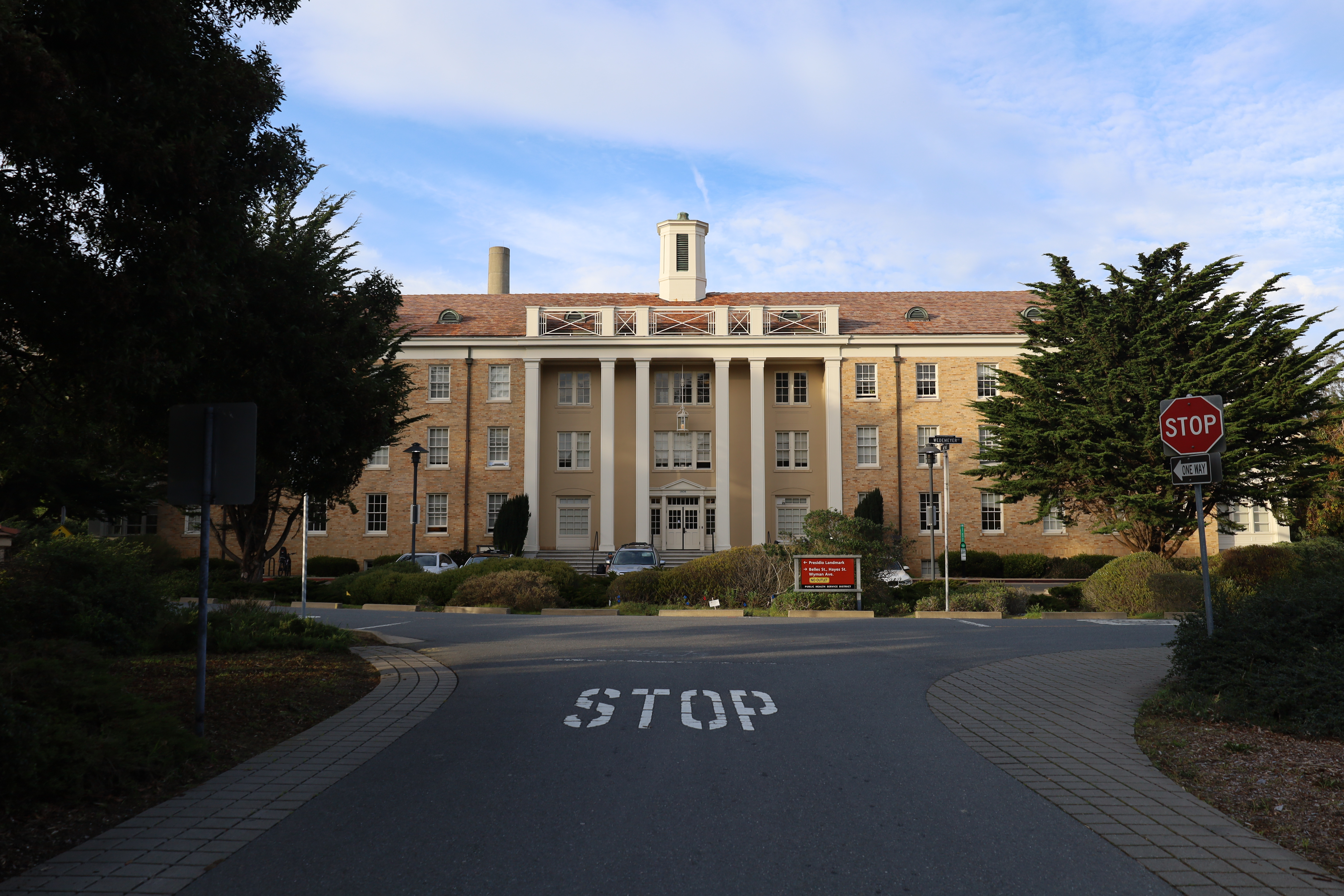
Former nurses' quarters

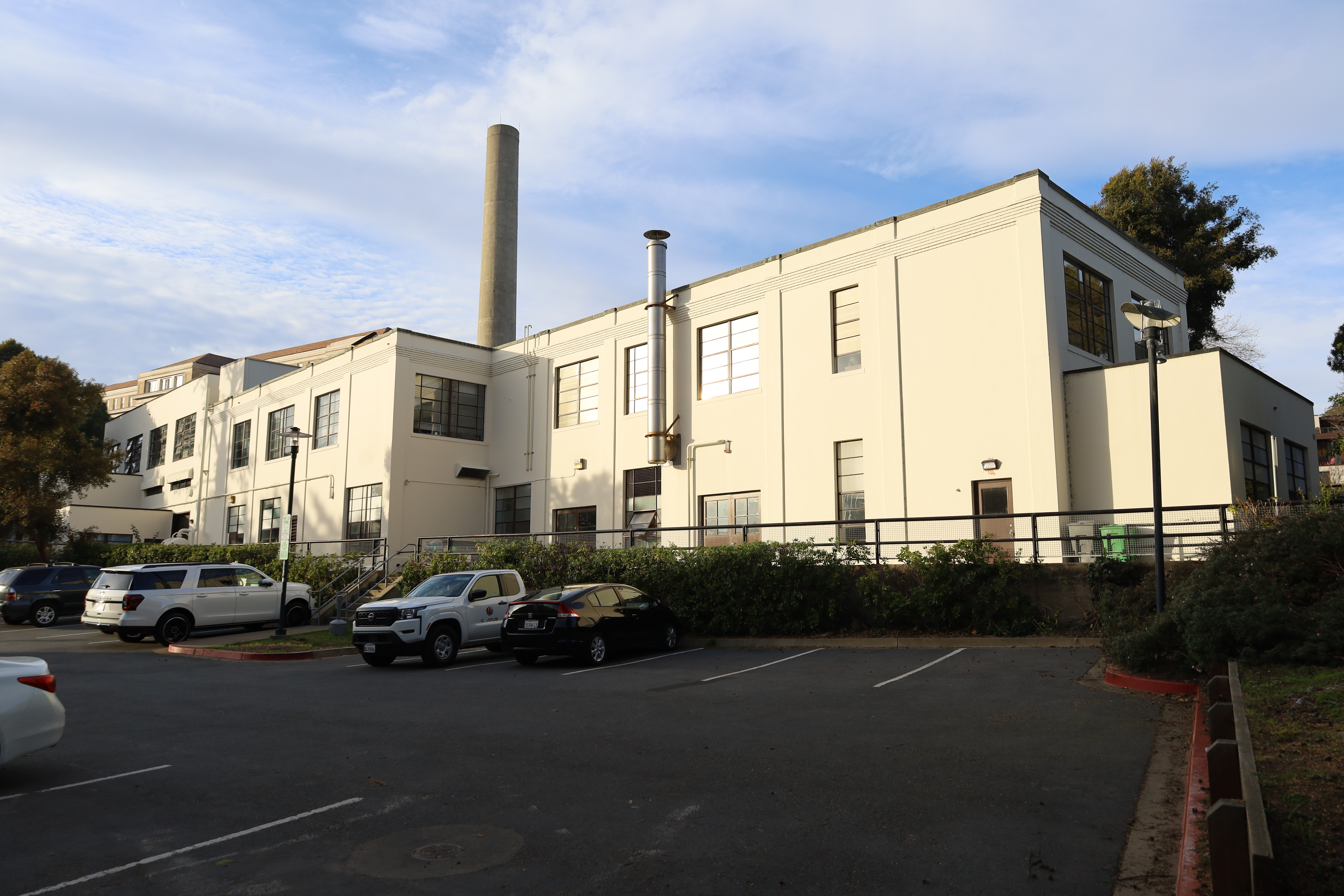
Former power plant

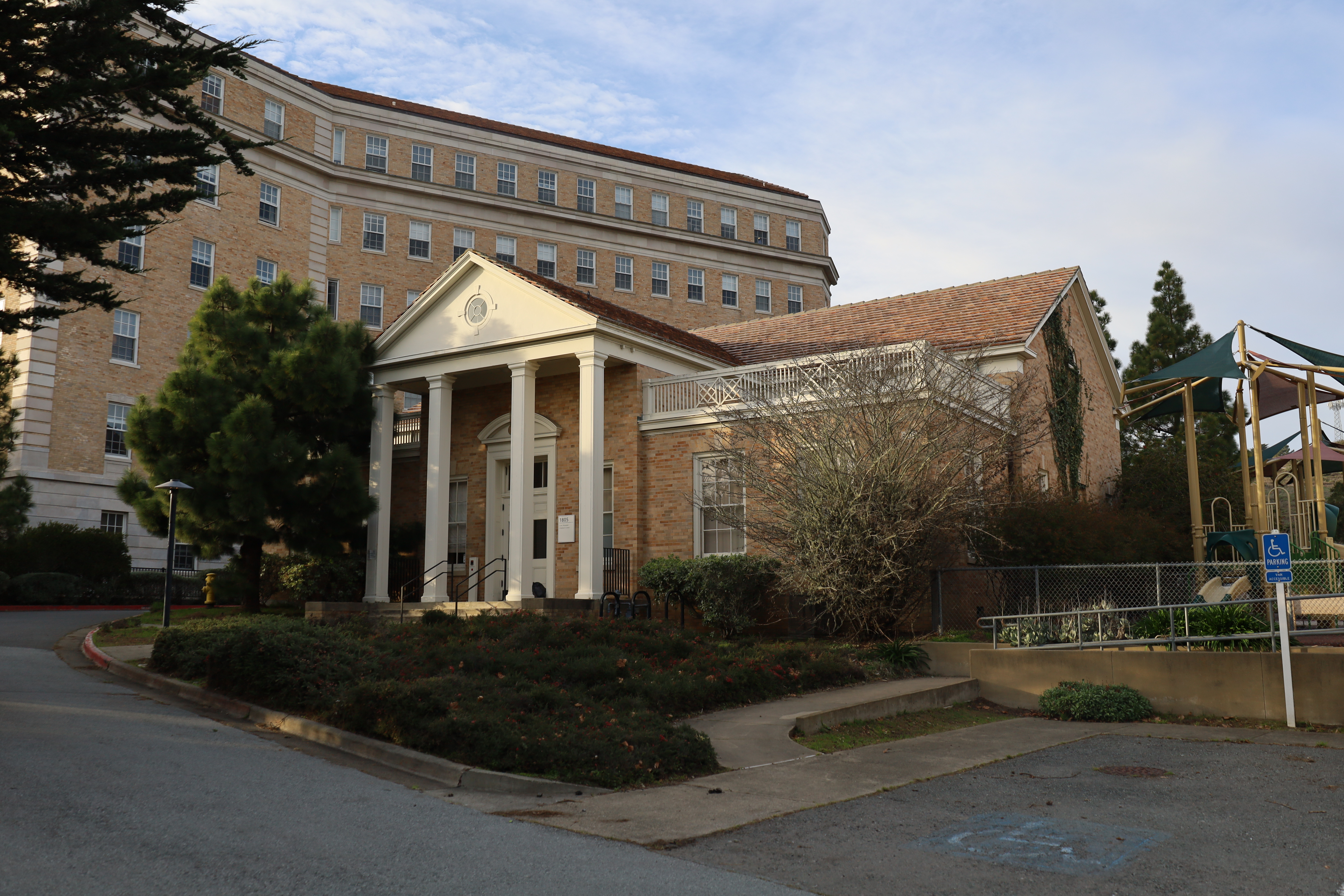
Former recreation center

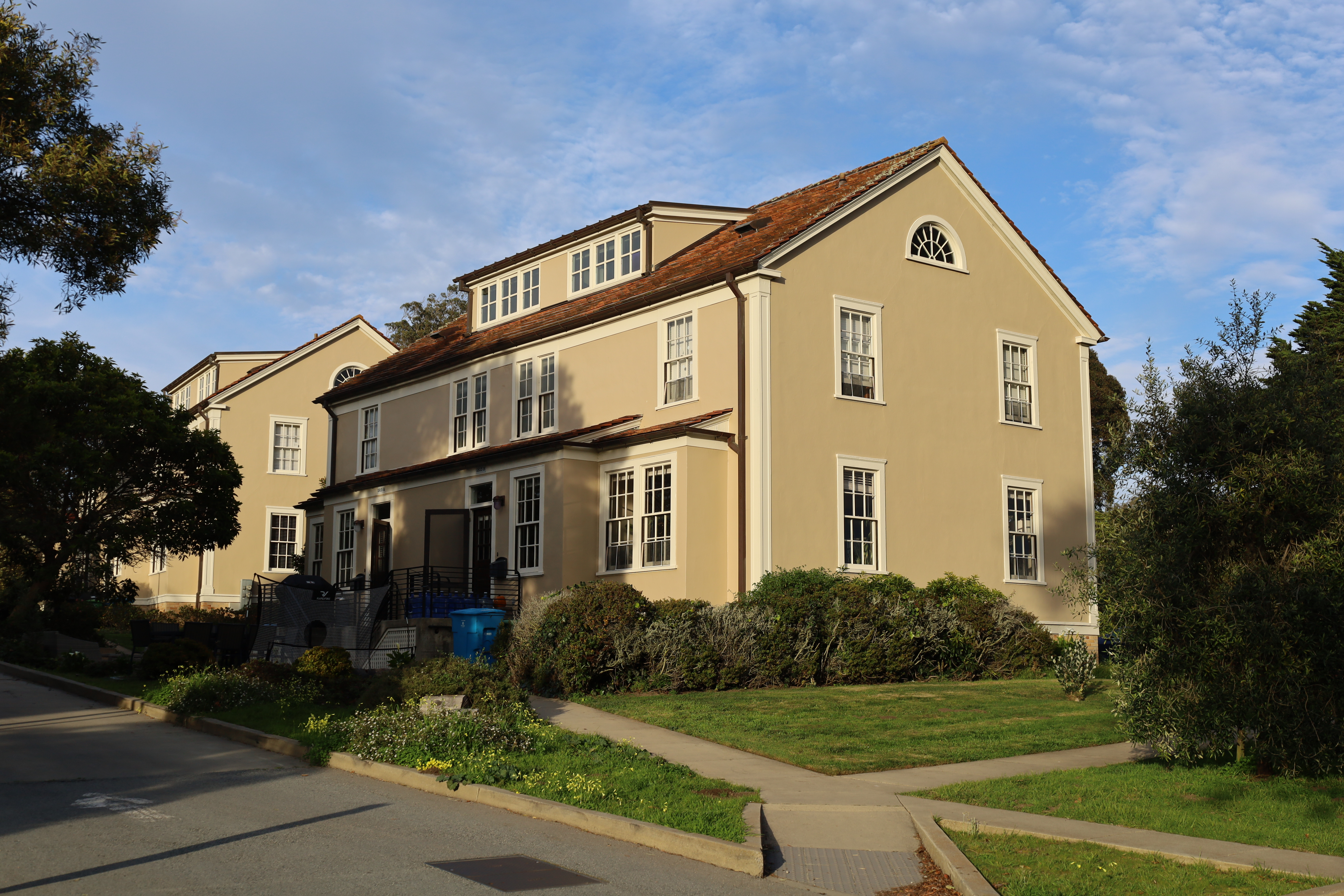
Former officers' housing

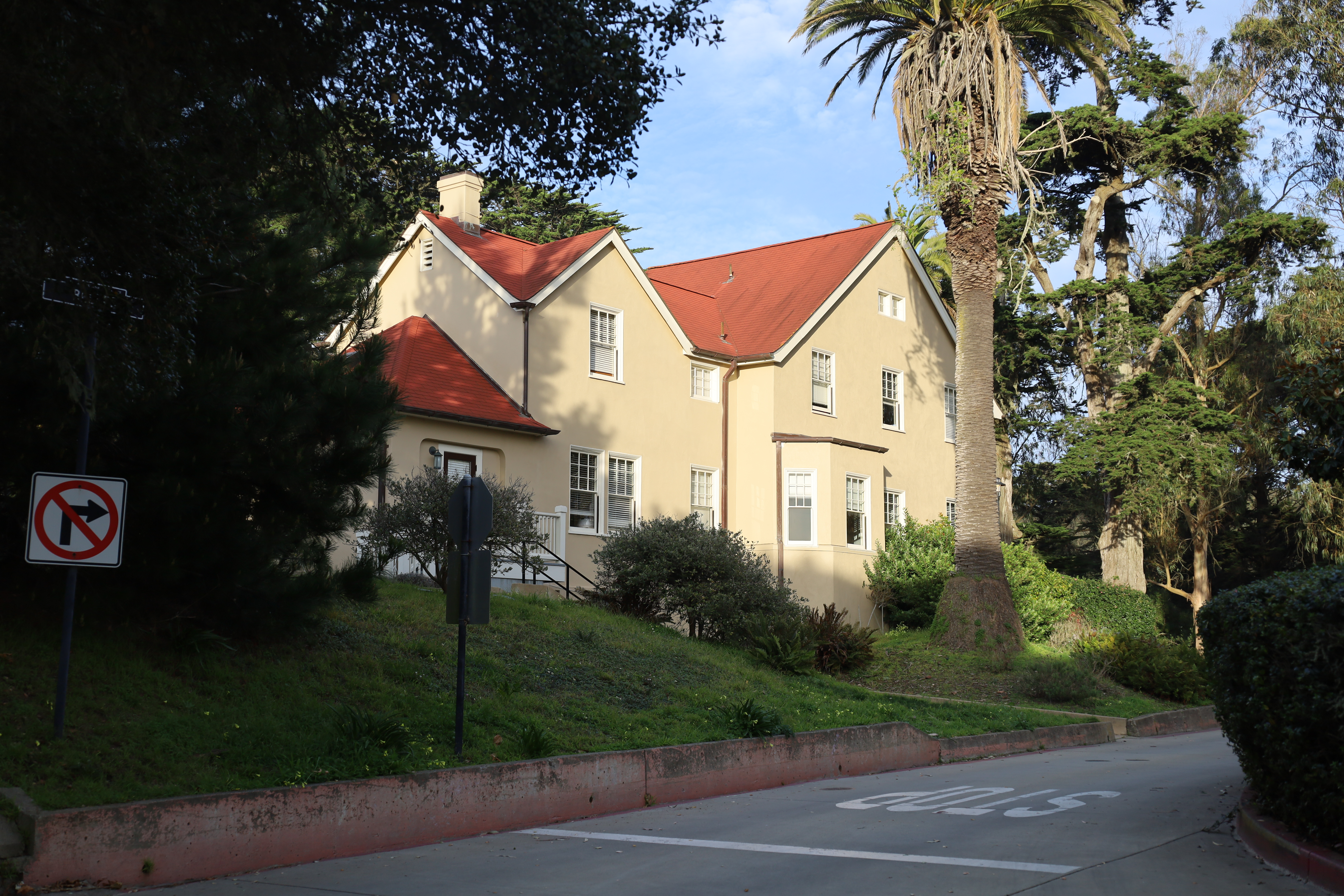
Former officers' housing

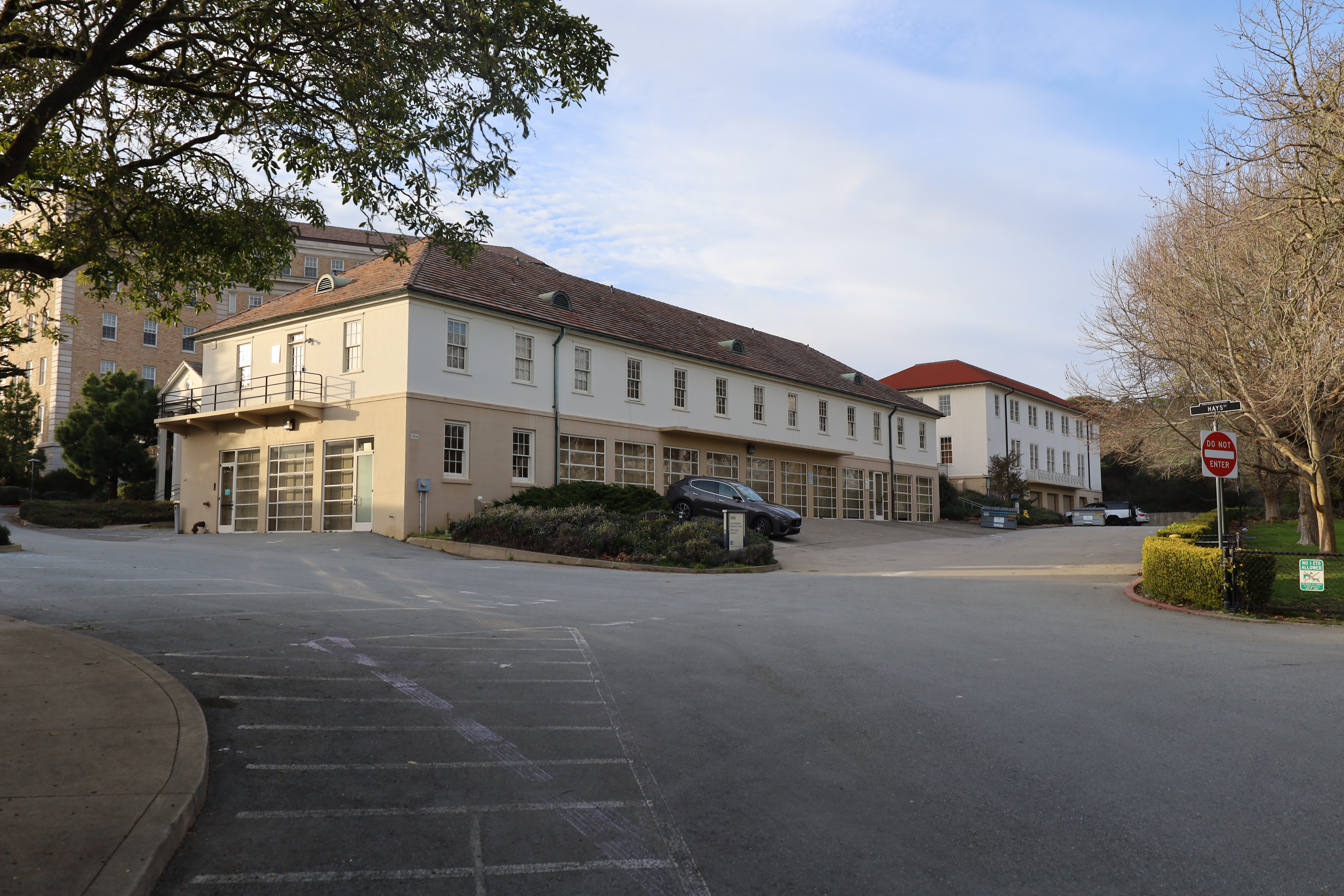
Former enlisted quarters

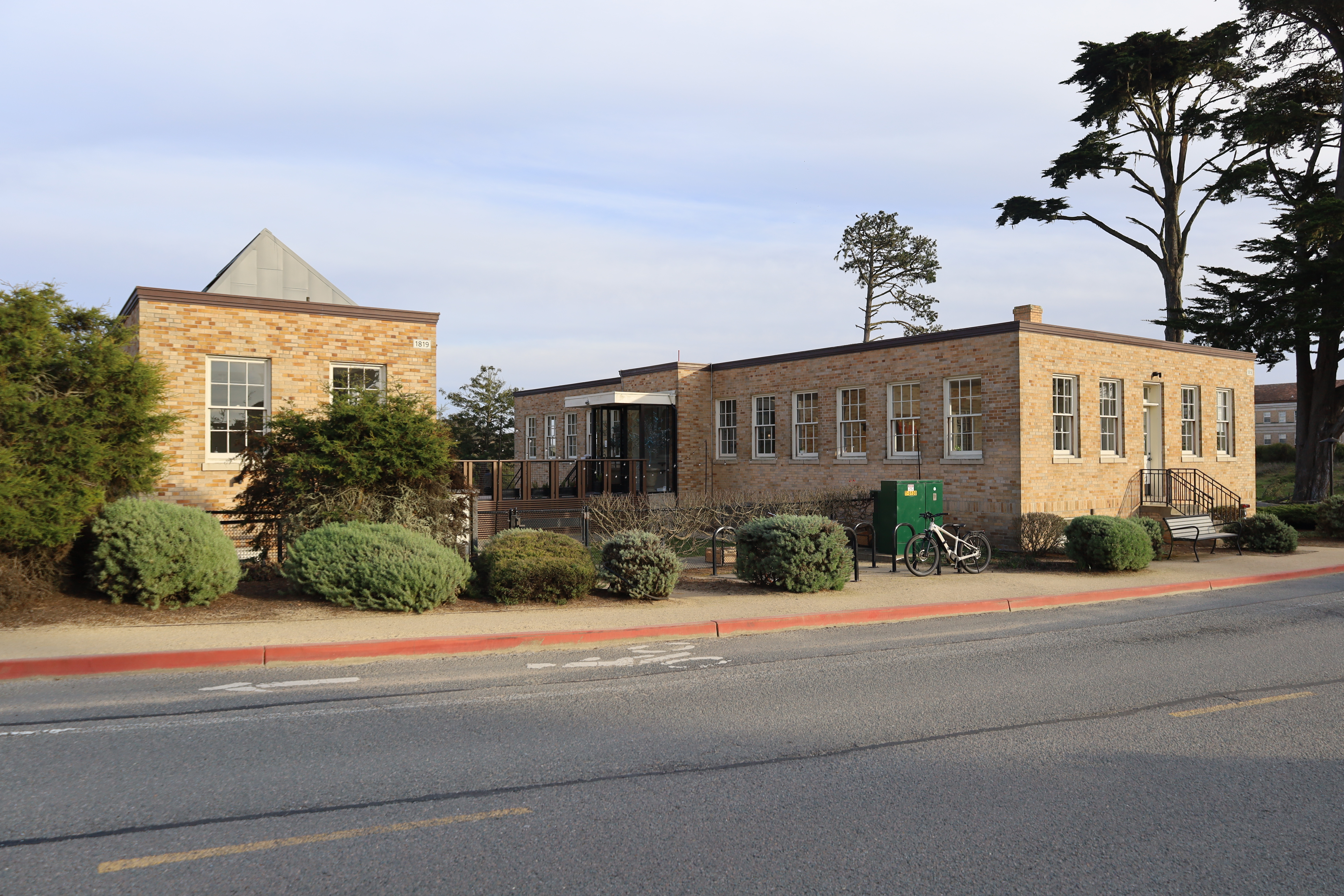
Former laboratories

== See also ==
- Golden Gate National Recreation Area
- Letterman Army Hospital
- List of hospitals in California
