= Martha's Vineyard Museum =

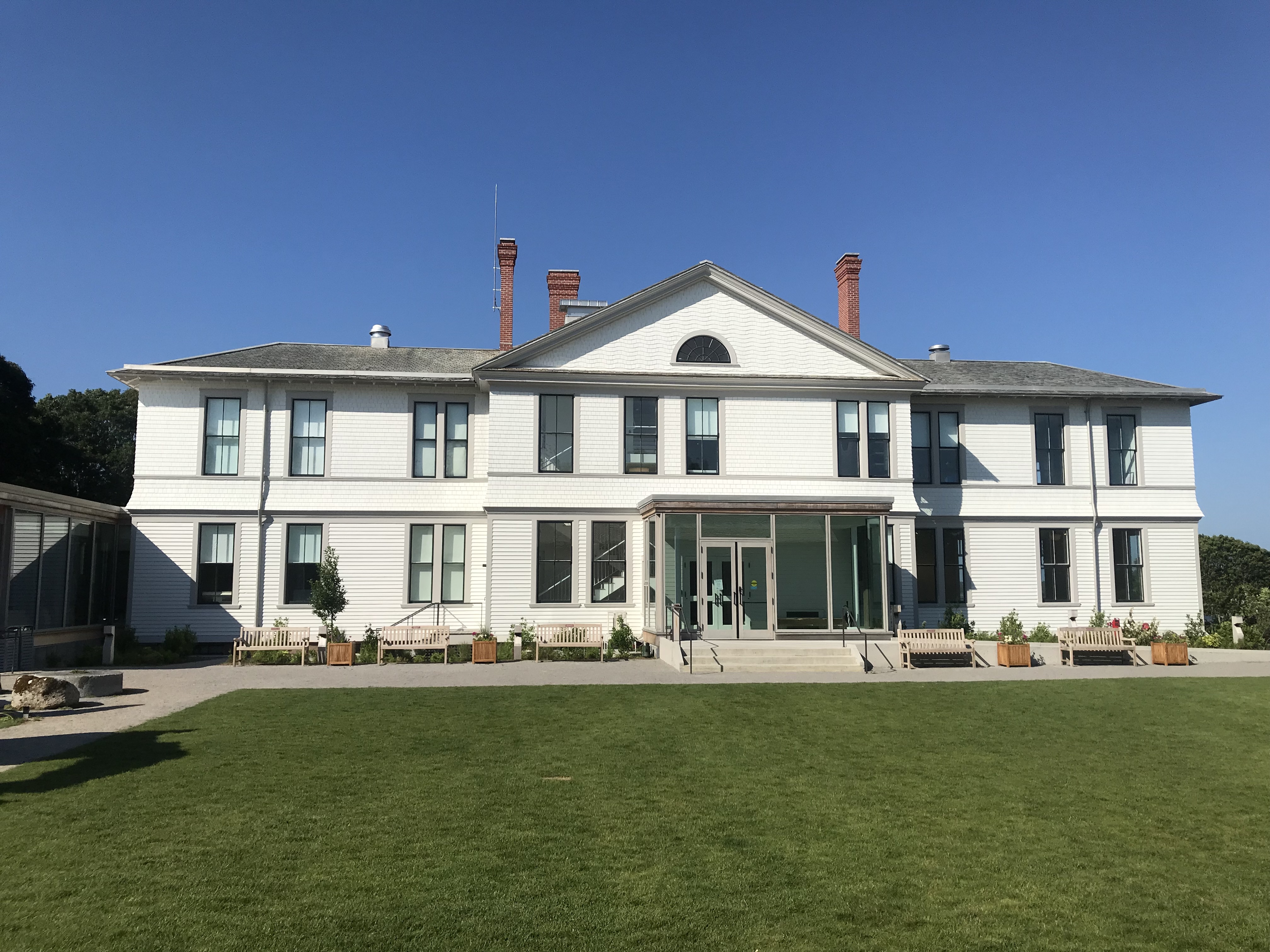
- Martha's Vineyard Museum, July 2019
- Established: 1922
- Location: 151 Lagoon Pond Road; Vineyard Haven, MA 02568 United States
- Coordinates: 41.456111°N 70.607222°W
- Type: History
- Director: Heather Seger
- Curator: Bonnie Stacy
- Website: Martha's Vineyard Museum

Martha's Vineyard Museum (MV Museum), originally named the "Dukes County Historical Society," is a historical and cultural museum located in Vineyard Haven and founded in 1922.

== History ==
The founders of the MV Museum acquired revolutionary era documents, realizing the historical importance of the documents they started a collection and an organization, the Dukes County Historical Society.

In 1996, the Society changed its name to the Martha's Vineyard Historical Society to reflect an emphasis on Martha's Vineyard. In 2006, the organization decided to change the name from the Martha's Vineyard Historical Society to the Martha's Vineyard Museum. In 2019, the Martha's Vineyard Museum completed its move from its Edgartown campus to its new location: a refurbished and expanded 1895 marine medical facility in Vineyard Haven, Massachusetts.

== Gallery ==
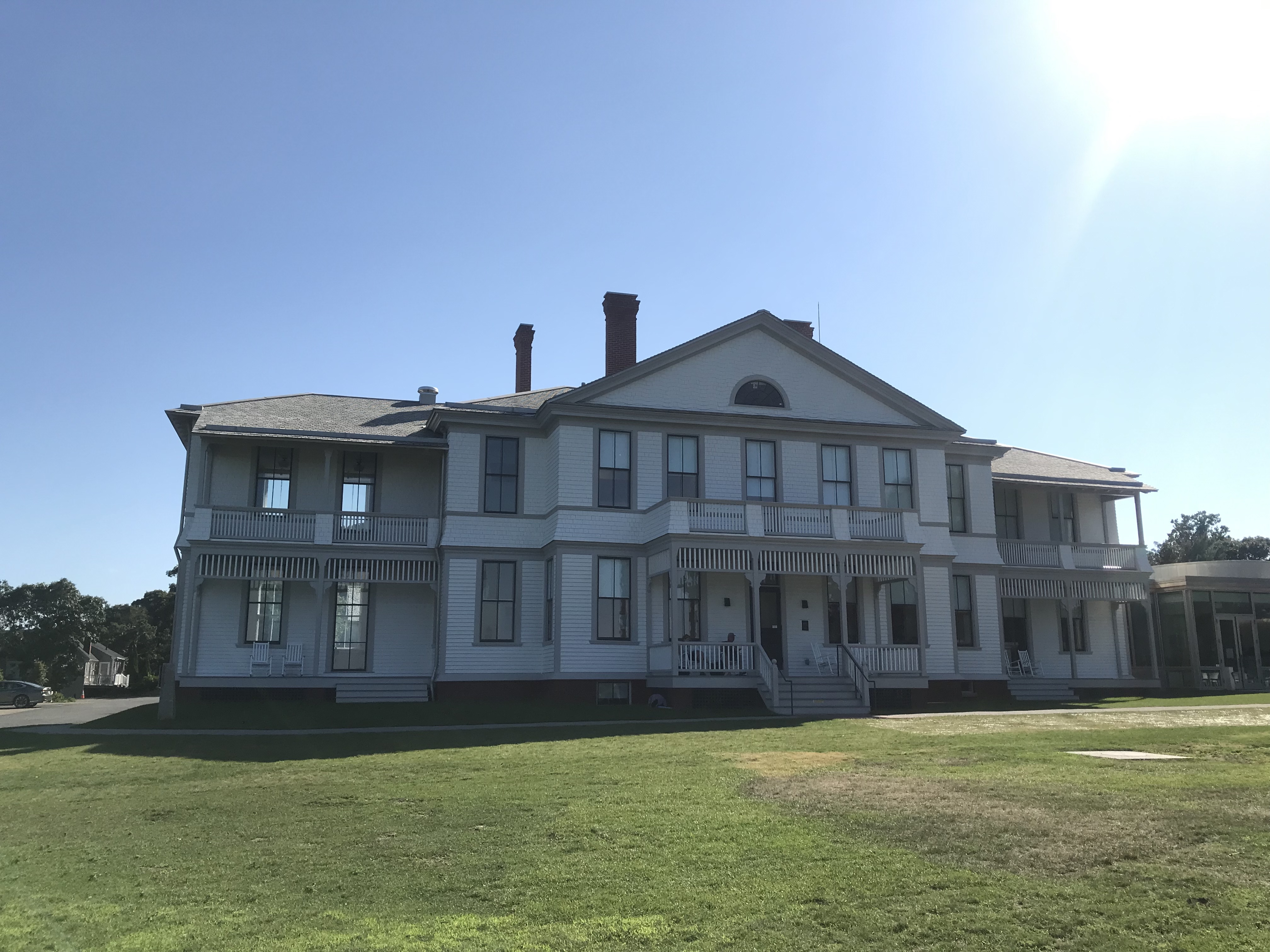
Front of building - July 2019

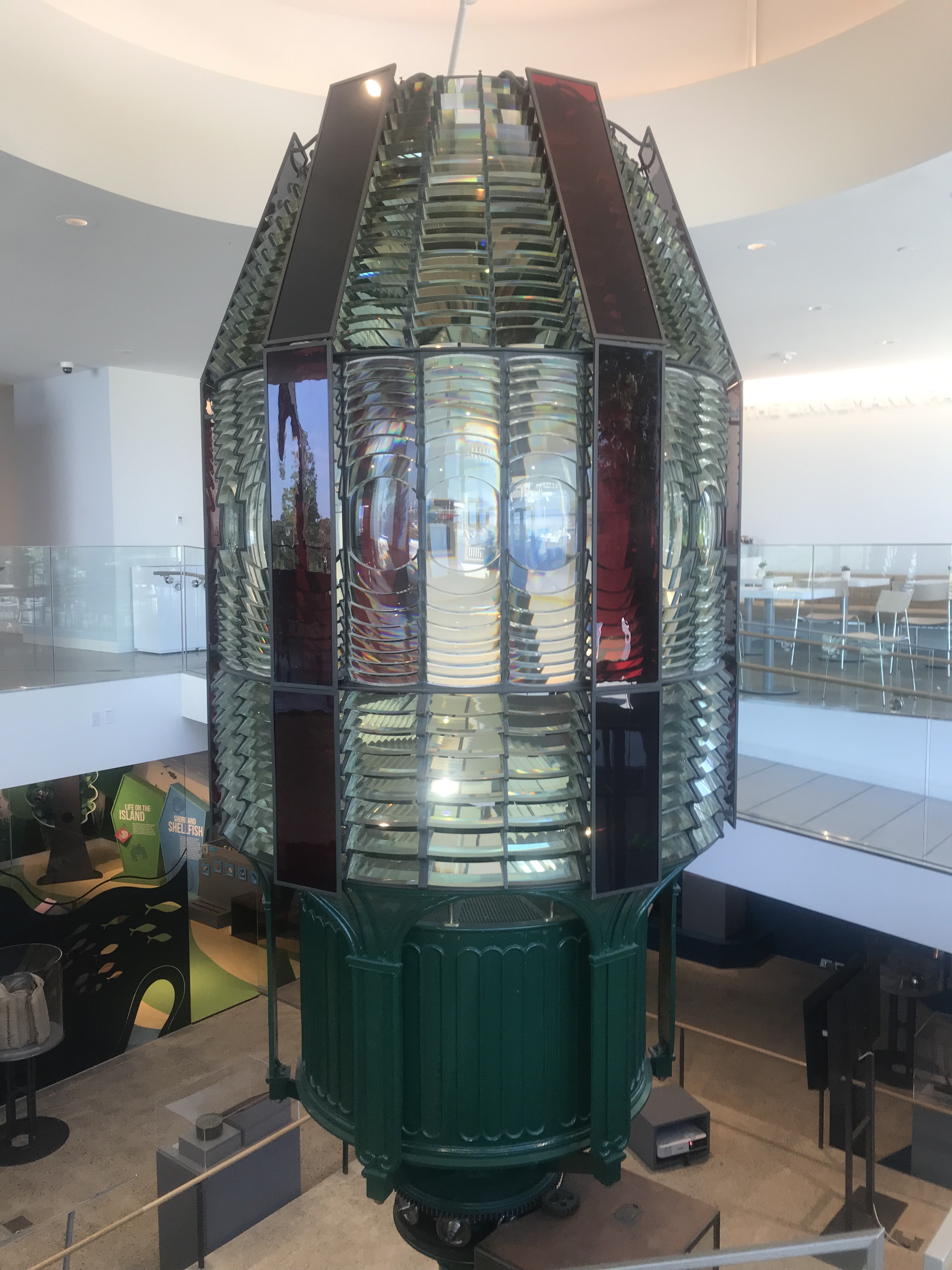
First order Fresnel Lens - July 2019

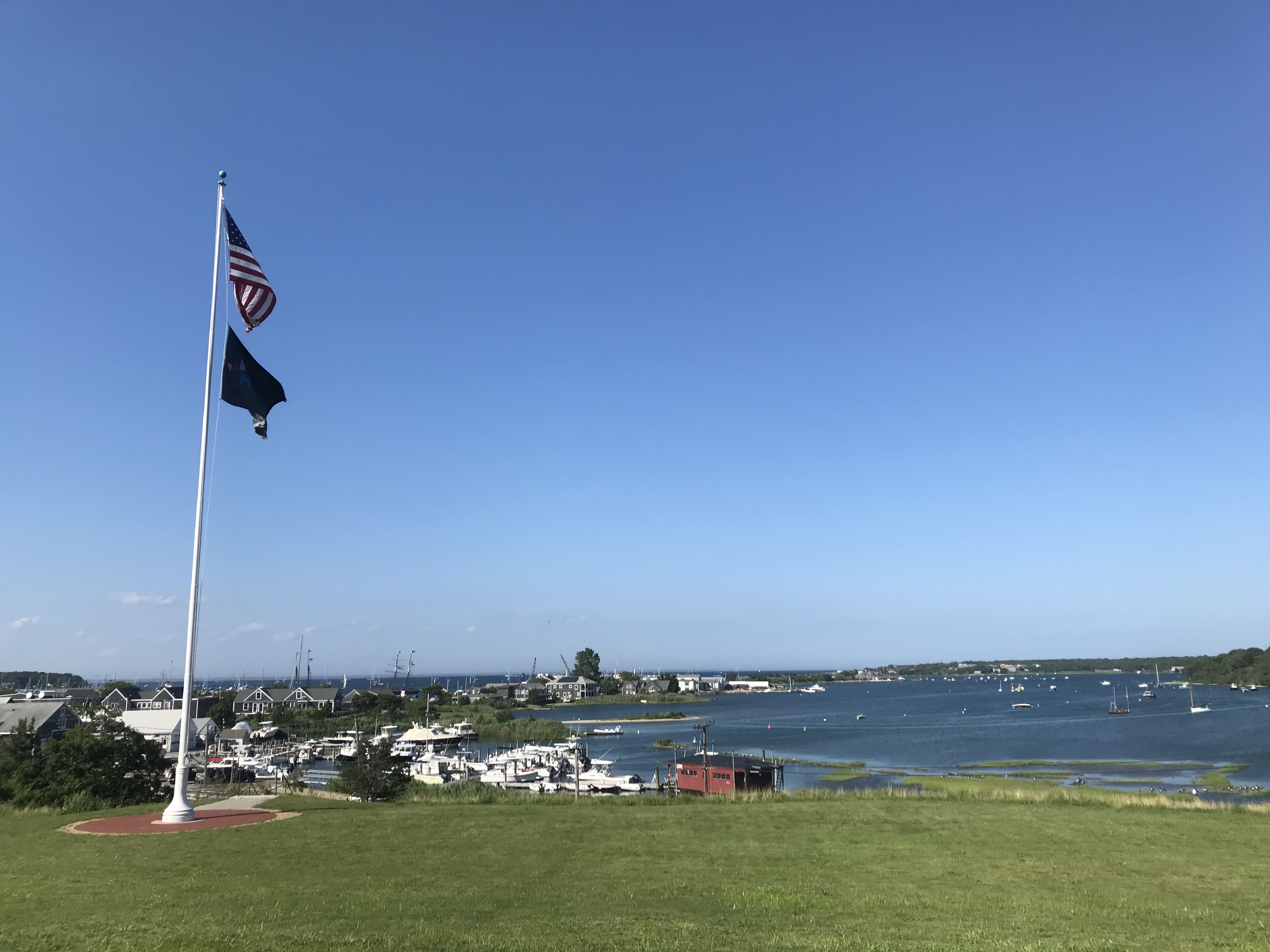
View from the MVMuseum - July 2019
