= Katharine Brush =

American writer

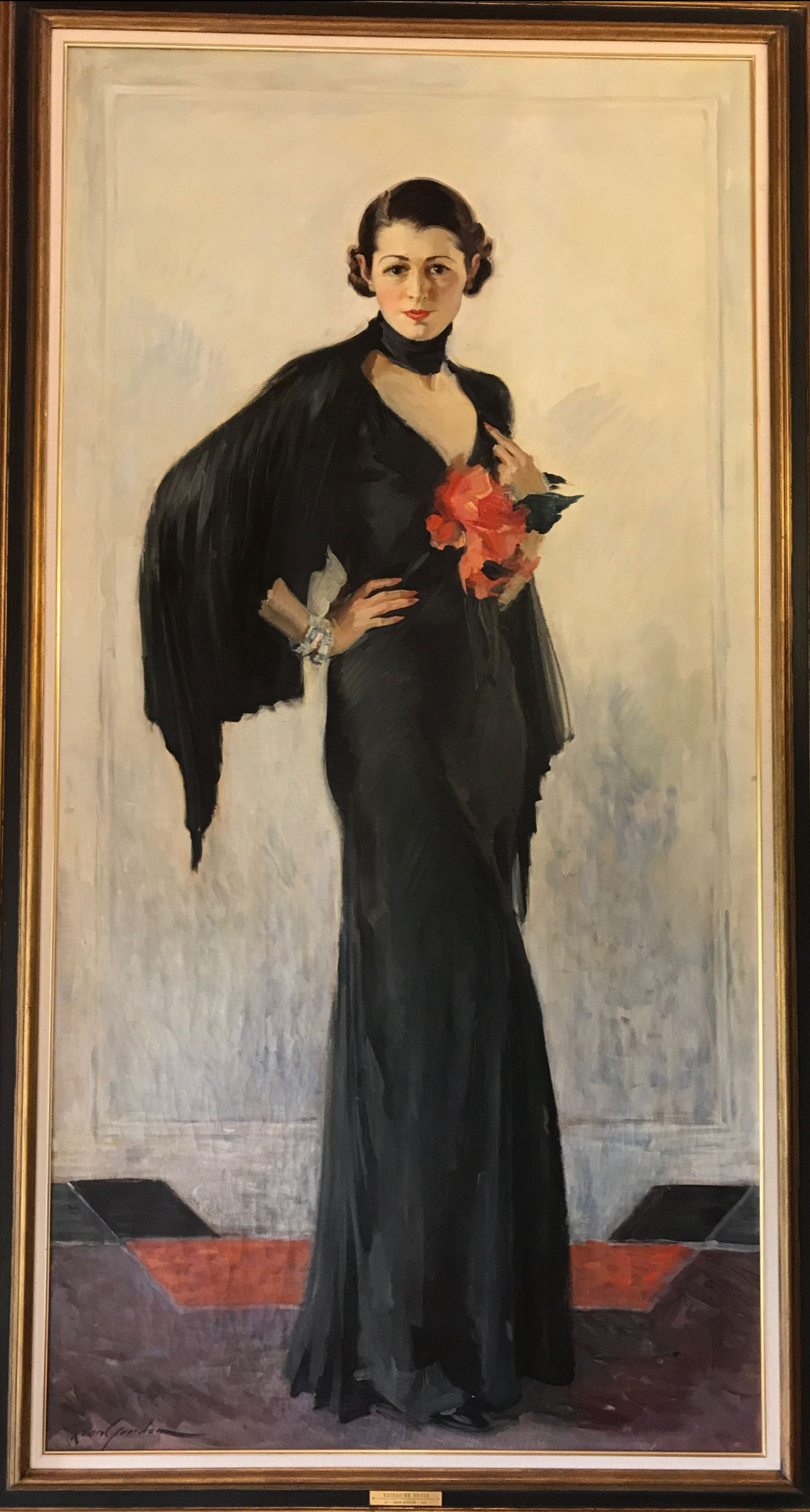
Katharine Brush: portrait by Leon Gordon, 1933

Katharine Brush (August 15, 1902 – June 10, 1952) was an American newspaper columnist, short-story writer, and novelist. In the era of the 1920s-30s, she was considered one of the country's most widely read fiction writers, as well as one of the highest-paid women writers of her time; several of her books were best-sellers, and several others were made into movies.

== Early years ==
Katharine Brush was born Katharine Louise Ingham in Middletown, Connecticut. She was the daughter of Charles S. Ingham, an educator, and his wife, Clara. Young Katharine did not attend college; directly after graduating from Centenary Collegiate Institute, a New Jersey boarding school, at age 16, she began working as a movie columnist for the Boston Evening Traveller. She married Thomas Stewart Brush when she was eighteen; he was the son of Louis H. Brush of Brush-Moore Newspapers. After the marriage, she moved to Ohio with him.

== Literary career ==
Brush's writing first attracted attention in the 1920s. During this time, multiple short stories of hers were published in serial magazines like College Humor and Cosmopolitan; the best known of these were collected in a book titled Night Club (1929); the title story first appeared in Harper's Magazine in September 1927.

Brush's works were characterized by her narrative style and wit: she was praised for being a keen observer of contemporary American life, a writer skilled at presenting the foibles of relationships in a realistic manner. Her story "Him and Her" (published in Collier's Weekly March 16, 1929) was an O. Henry Award winner named "Best Short Short" of 1929, and in 1932, she was again named a Best Short Story writer, by the O. Henry Memorial Committee. She also received honorable mentions for her short story "Night Club" (1927); her 1931 story "Good Wednesday", which also appeared in Harper's; as well as for a 1932 short story, "Football Girl", which was published in College Humor in October 1931.

During the mid-1920s, in addition to writing short stories and beginning a novel, she also wrote syndicated columns. Among her columns in the early-to-mid-1920s were occasional articles about sports, including boxing, and college football. And during 1925 and 1926, she covered the World Series for several newspapers in Ohio.

Brush's first novel, Glitter, was published in 1926, to favorable reviews. Her novel Young Man of Manhattan was named the 9th best-selling novel of 1930 by Publishers Weekly and later that year was made into a film starring Claudette Colbert, Norman Foster, and Ginger Rogers. Her subsequent novel Red-Headed Woman was made into a film in 1932 starring Jean Harlow; playwright Anita Loos adapted the story for the screen.

In 1936, Katharine Brush christened the USCGC Ingham; the new cutter was formally commissioned on 12 September 1936; it would later be decommissioned in 1988. The ship was named after one of her ancestors, American politician Samuel D. Ingham, and this incident was discussed in her 1940 autobiographical collection of works, This Is On Me. It also featured a story about what in the 1970s became known as latchkey children) OCLC 26043754. Critics praised the book for its honesty in showing the development of Brush's talent, by including some early works that were not as impressive, and then moving on to her well-received later works. In addition, the book was said to offer a behind-the-scenes look at how Brush went from obscurity to success as an author. Ironically, Brush (whose nickname was "Kay") frequently told friends that despite being popular and critically acclaimed, she worried that after she died, she would probably be forgotten. In 1967, only 15 years after her death, a critic who had known her noted that in fact, fewer and fewer people remembered who she was.

== Later years and legacy ==
Her first marriage ended in divorce; she moved to New York City and remarried in 1929, to businessman Hubert Charles "Bobby" Winans, but that marriage ended in divorce in 1941. She was the mother of one child, Thomas, with her first husband. She died after a long illness, in New York: some sources say she was 49, but some sources say she was 52. At the time when she took ill, she had been working on a new novel, to be called "Lover Come Back." Her son Thomas, who became a newspaper executive and a patron of the arts, donated the funding for a new library in her memory to the Loomis Chaffee School of Windsor, CT, in 1968. The building, designed by architect Kenneth DeMay of Hideo Sasaki's firm Sasaki, Dawson, DeMay Associates (now Sasaki Associates), is still in use today at the school. The Katharine Brush Library contains a larger than life-size portrait by Leon Gordon of Katharine Brush looking down the length of the second floor.

Brush's short story "Birthday Party" is frequently taught in literature classes. It appeared on the 2005 Advanced Placement English Literature Exam; the story was originally published in The New Yorker's Fiction section on March 16, 1946. Brush's Connecticut home was featured on a 2006 episode of HGTV's "If Walls Could Talk".

== Selected list of works ==
- Glitter (1926)
- Little Sins (1927)
- Night Club (1929)
- Young Man of Manhattan (1930), which appeared on the 1930 Publishers Weekly bestseller list and was filmed as Young Man of Manhattan (1930) with Claudette Colbert.
- Red-Headed Woman (1931), which was made into Red-Headed Woman (1932), a movie starring Jean Harlow
- Other Women (1933)
- Don't Ever Leave Me (1935)
- Free Woman (1936), filmed as Honeymoon in Bali (1939) with Madeleine Carroll.
- Marry For Money (1937) made into Mannequin (1937 film) with Joan Crawford.
- This Is on Me (1940) (a mostly non-fiction autobiography with unconventional structure)
- You Go Your Way (novel) (1941)
- The Boy from Maine (1942)
- Out of My Mind (1943)
- This Man and This Woman (1944)
- When She Was Bad (1948) (reprinting of You Go Your Way)
