= Bryant Park Studios =

Office building in Manhattan, New York

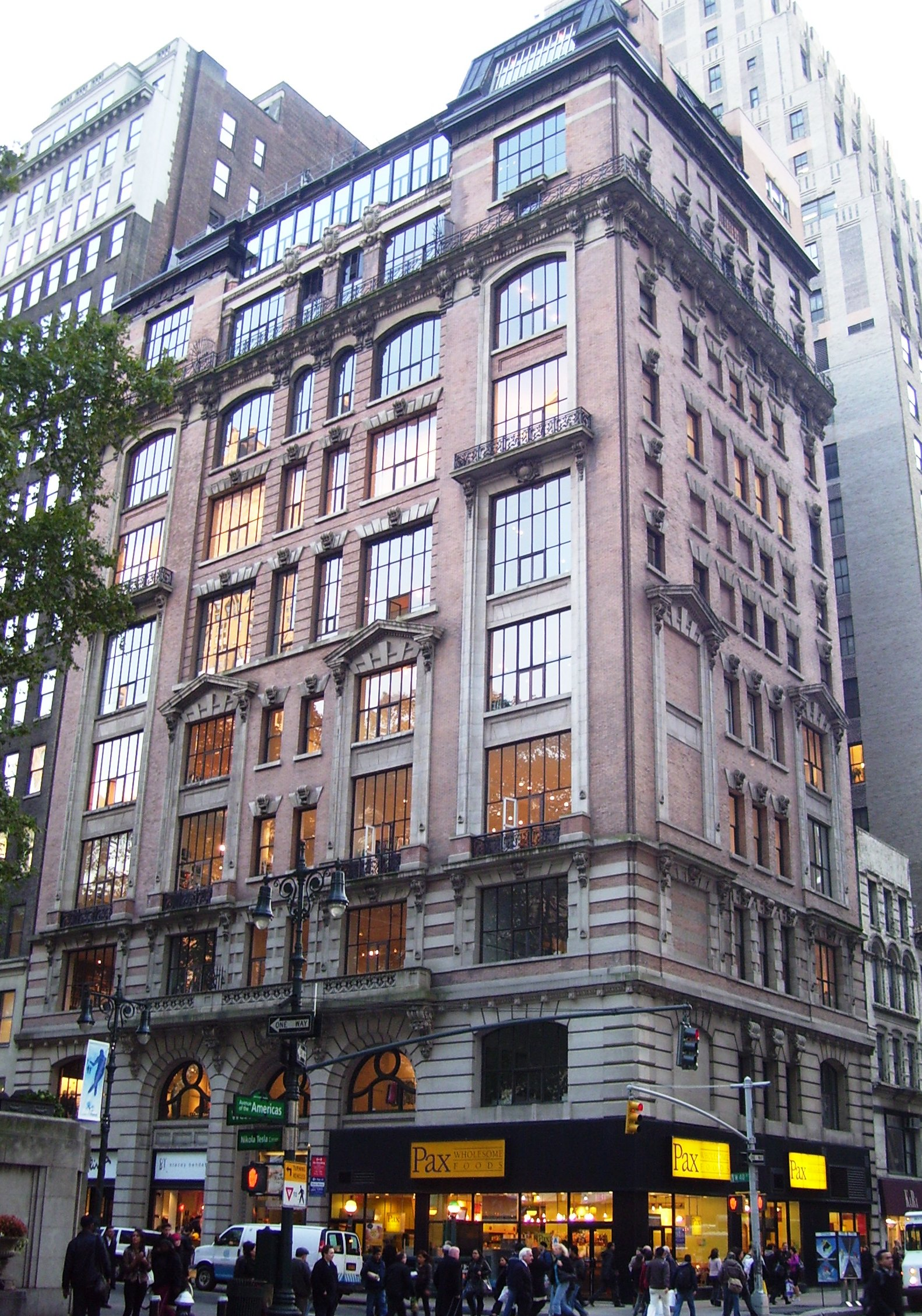
- Interactive map of the Bryant Park Studios area

General information
- Type: Office
- Architectural style: French Beaux-Arts
- Location: 80 West 40th Street; 1054 Avenue of the Americas, Manhattan, New York, United States
- Coordinates: 40°45′12″N 73°59′05″W
- Groundbreaking: 1900
- Opened: 1901
- Owner: 80 West 40th Street Associates
- Landlord: Mountain Development

Technical details
- Floor count: 10
- Floor area: 61,304 square feet (5,695.3 m^{2})
- Lifts/elevators: 2

Design and construction
- Architect: Charles A. Rich

New York City Landmark
- Designated: December 13, 1988
- Reference no.: 1542

The Bryant Park Studios (formerly known as the Beaux-Arts Building) is an office building at 80 West 40th Street in the Midtown Manhattan neighborhood of New York City, New York, United States. The building, at the corner of 40th Street and Sixth Avenue and overlooking the southwest corner of Bryant Park, was designed by Charles A. Rich in the French Beaux-Arts style. Built from 1900 to 1901 by Abraham A. Anderson, the building is one of several in Manhattan that were built in the early 20th century as both studios and residences for artists.

The Bryant Park Studios is 10 stories tall with several mezzanine levels. The lowest two stories of the facade are clad in rusticated blocks of terracotta, while the other stories have pink brick with terracotta and stone decoration. The brickwork of the facade contains both broad and narrow bays, and the northern side facing 40th Street contains large studio windows facing Bryant Park. The Cafe des Beaux-Arts once operated at the ground story and basement. The upper stories had forty units, the largest of which was Anderson's own double-story penthouse. Since the late 20th century, the former studios have served mostly as offices and showrooms, and the lower stories have contained storefronts.

The Bryant Park Studios was developed by Anderson, who leased the building to another company in 1920. Anderson lived in his penthouse until his death in 1940, after which his family sold the building. By the late 20th century, the building was converted for office use. The Bryant Park Studios was designated a city landmark by the New York City Landmarks Preservation Commission (LPC) in 1988. The building has been owned since 1980 by the Mountain Development Corporation, which restored the building in the late 1980s and the 2000s.

== Site ==
The Bryant Park Studios is at the southeast corner of 40th Street and Sixth Avenue (Avenue of the Americas) in the Midtown Manhattan neighborhood of New York City, New York, United States. It overlooks the southwestern corner of Bryant Park. The building occupies a rectangular land lot with an area of 5,950 square feet (553 m^{2}) and a frontage of 100 feet (30 m) along 40th Street and 59.5 feet (18.1 m) on Sixth Avenue.

The Bryant Park Studios is one of several structures on 40th Street between Fifth and Sixth Avenues, which forms the southern end of Bryant Park. On the same block are the American Radiator Building, Engineering Societies' Building, Engineers' Club Building, The Bryant, and 452 Fifth Avenue to the east, as well as the Haskins & Sells Building to the southeast and Bryant Park Studios to the west. Other nearby places include the New York Public Library Main Branch across 40th Street to the northeast; 7 Bryant Park and the Springs Mills Building to the west; and the Colony Arcade Building one block south. Immediately outside the Bryant Park Studios is an entrance to the New York City Subway's 42nd Street–Bryant Park/Fifth Avenue station, which is served by the 7, <7>, B, D, F, <F>, and M trains.

The site had historically been occupied by the Hotel Royal, which burned down in the late 19th century. The site was assembled from four lots that collectively cost $3,200 in 1900 (equivalent to $98,900 in 2024). The surrounding block of 40th Street had contained brownstone row houses through the 1920s, before they were replaced by several other multi-story structures.

== Architecture ==
The Bryant Park Studios building was designed by Charles A. Rich in the Beaux-Arts Gothic style. It was developed by Abraham Archibald Anderson, a prominent watercolor artist in the late 19th and early 20th centuries. The building was popularly known as the Beaux Arts Building after the Café des Beaux Arts on the ground floor. Robinson & Wallace were the general contractors. The Bryant Park Studios contains ten full stories. (Note: The New York City Landmarks Preservation Commission counts these offset duplex levels as their own stories. Therefore, the Sixth Avenue facade is counted as having twelve stories.) It is 131.23 feet (40.00 m) tall and has its main roof at 166 feet (51 m) above ground. A two-story mansard roof on the building's western section dates to a 1923 renovation. The building is New York City's oldest surviving high-rise studio building that was purposely designed for artists.

=== Facade ===
The facade is made of pink brick, stone, and terracotta. When the Bryant Park Studios were built, the facade was visible on all sides, though subsequent development obscured the south and east elevations. The north elevation facing 40th Street, as well as the west elevation on Sixth Avenue, remain visible and are both divided into three horizontal sections: a base, midsection, and upper section. The 40th Street elevation is divided vertically into five bays. The building has wide studio windows on 40th Street, which generally measure 12 by 12 feet (3.7 by 3.7 m). The Sixth Avenue elevation is generally arranged as a central bay flanked by two end bays.

==== Base ====
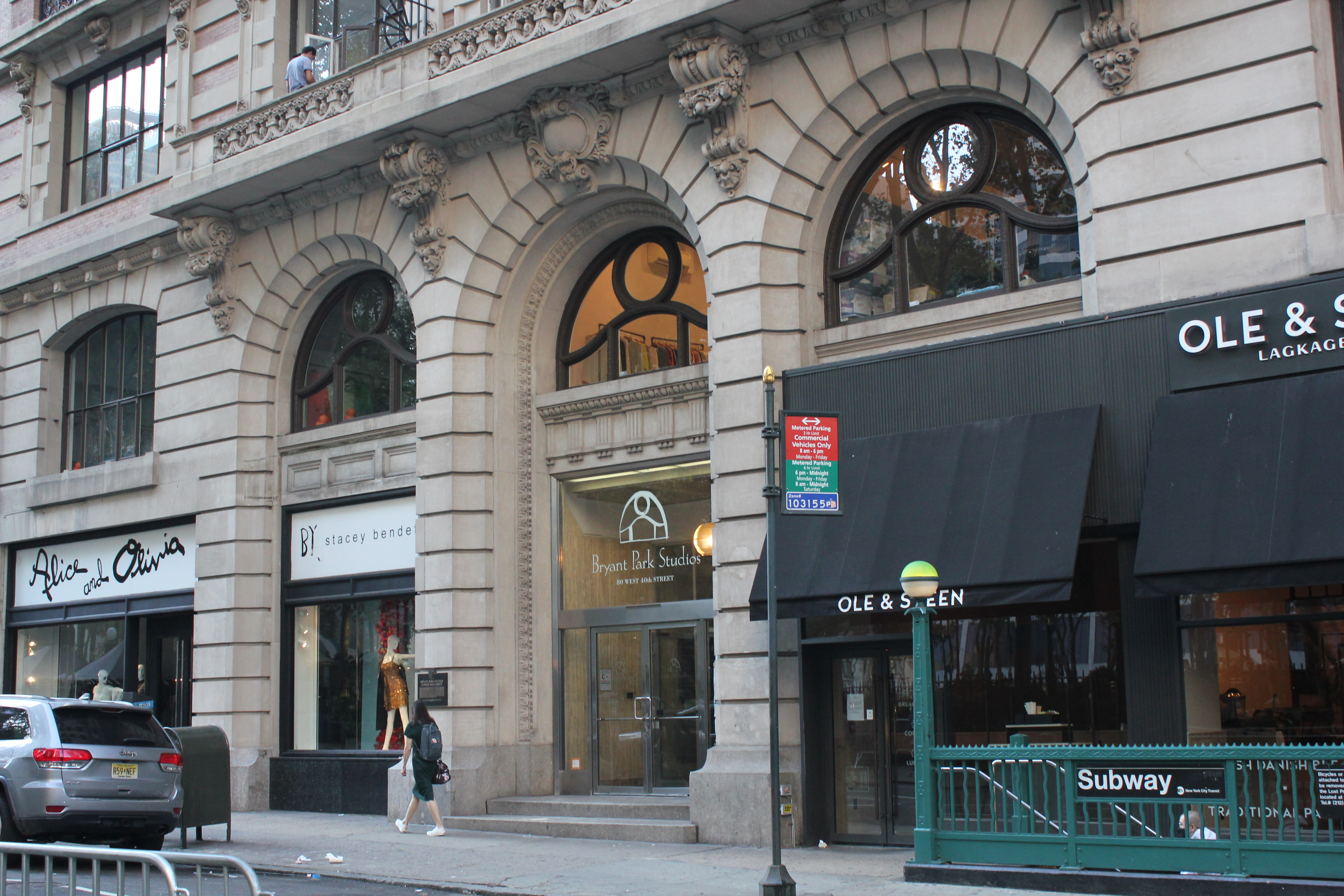
Main entrance

The first two stories are made of rusticated terracotta, which is carved to look like rusticated stone. The three center bays on 40th Street contain double-height archways. The center archway serves as the building's main entrance and contains a plate-glass door, above which is a keystone with a cartouche. The remainder of the ground story on 40th Street and Sixth Avenue contains signs and storefronts. The Sixth Avenue elevation has had a storefront since the building's opening, but the storefront was redesigned at some point in the 20th century.

At the second story on 40th Street, the center arches have decorative mullions. Above these arches are heavy stone brackets, which support a balcony with carved foliate motifs and swags. Within the center bay on Sixth Avenue, there are three narrow arched windows with volutes above them. The outermost bays on both elevations have segmental arches. A simple cornice runs above most of the second story, except at the center arches on 40th Street.

==== Midsection ====
The third story is a transitional story with alternating bands of pink brick and terracotta. On 40th Street, the central bay has two narrow windows. The other four bays on that elevation have wide studio windows, which are separated horizontally by terracotta bands and contain broad square-headed lintels. The windows' keystones are volutes, and the third story on 40th Street is capped by a narrow stone cornice. A simpler arrangement appears on Sixth Avenue; the outermost bays are broad square-headed openings, which flank three narrower windows. Above these openings are splayed lintels, as well as volutes serving as keystones.

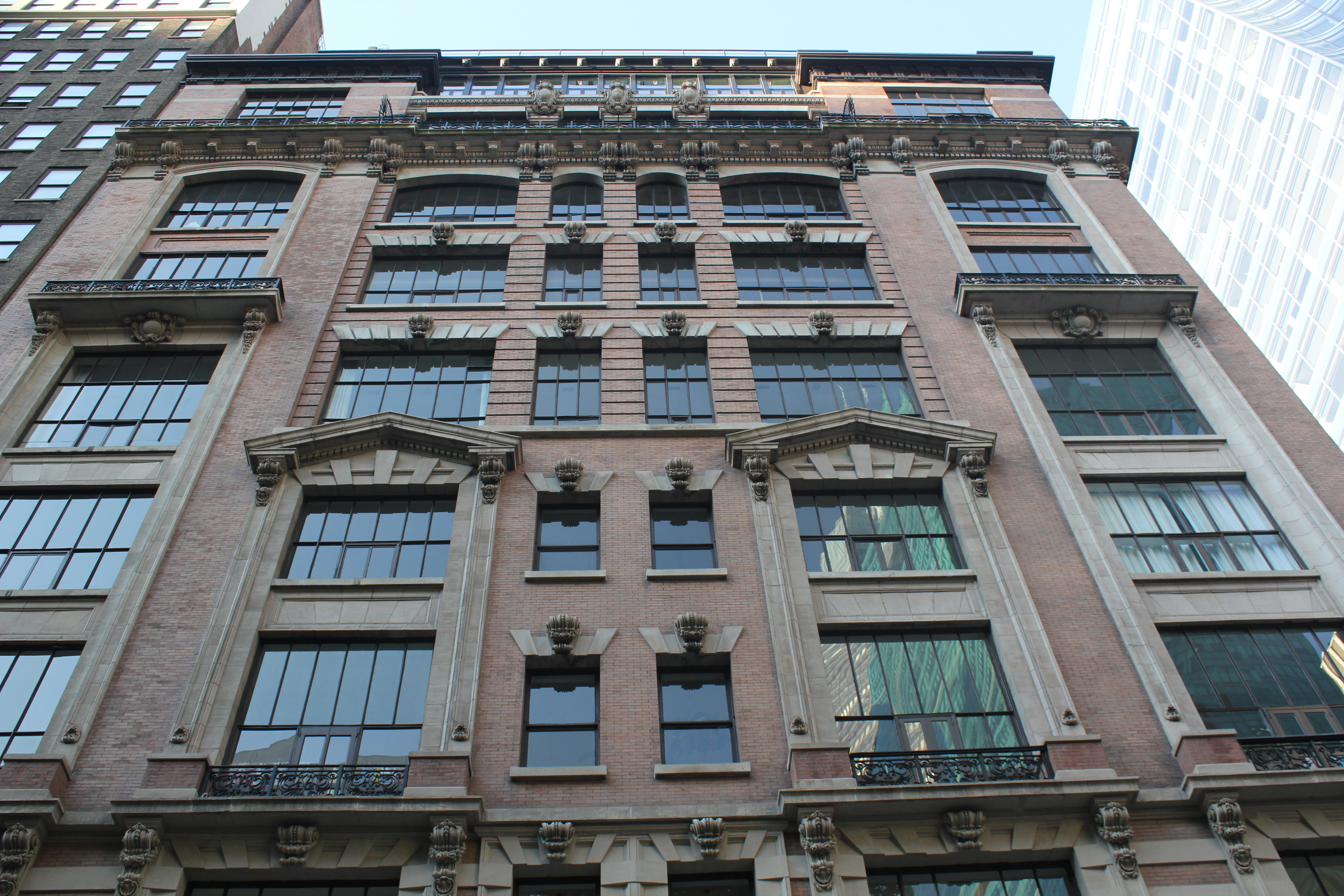
Midsection detail on 40th Street. The center bay has two windows on each story. Immediately flanking the center bay are the second-outermost bays. The outermost bays are visible at far left and right.

The fourth through eighth stories are clad with pink brick and have terracotta and stone ornamentation. On the 40th Street elevation, most windows are full-height; the center bay has two narrow windows, while the remaining bays have a large studio window. All bays, except the center one, have a balcony at the fourth story. The outermost bays are flanked by continuous brick piers from the fourth to eighth stories, with a volute above the sixth story and a balcony at the seventh. The three middle bays are arranged differently. At the fourth and fifth stories, the center bay's windows are topped by volutes, and the second-outermost bays have double-height stone frames topped by pediments. At the sixth through eighth stories, the three middle bays have full-height recessed windows, each with volutes and splayed lintels above them. A window sill connects the three middle bays at the sixth story. On the eighth story, all openings contain segmental arches.

The midsection on Sixth Avenue contains seven rows of windows. The fourth and fifth stories correspond to those on 40th Street, The outermost bays have double-height stone frames topped by pediments, while the center bay has three windows, each with volutes and splayed lintels above them. The sixth through eighth stories contain five offset duplex levels, with mezzanines above the sixth and eighth stories. The windows are arranged in a 1-5-1 configuration, with one sash window in each of the outer bays and five in the center bay. There are generally splayed lintels and volutes above each window, except for those above the eighth mezzanine level. On both elevations, there is a large overhanging cornice just below the ninth story, supported by large brackets and modillions.

==== Upper stories ====
At the ninth floor, there is a balcony and a metal balustrade above the cornice. On 40th Street, the outermost bays are flanked by continuous brick piers, as with the midsection, and contain windows flanking small doorways. Between these is a recessed set of windows, with two large windows flanking two narrow windows. These windows are separated by wide pilasters, above which are decorative capitals. On Sixth Avenue, the ninth-story windows are rectangular and contain volutes and splayed lintels above them. There is a mezzanine above the ninth story on Sixth Avenue, which has plain openings. Two of the center windows on the ninth mezzanine have been combined into a modern-style opening. (Note: The Landmarks Preservation Commission counts the ninth story and ninth mezzanine as respectively being the eleventh and twelfth stories on the Sixth Avenue elevation.)

The tenth story contains a recessed bank of windows on 40th Street. When the building was completed, it had an angled skylight at the center and antefixes to the west and east. A mansard roof on the western side was built in 1923, and the antefixes were removed. A brick chimney is at the north end of the mansard, while a brick dormer is at the south end. The skylight itself, illuminating Anderson's penthouse, was subsequently covered with paint outside and tar inside.

=== Features ===
==== Ground floor and basement ====
The ground floor and basement originally housed the Cafe des Beaux Arts, which had a kitchen and a ratskeller, or German beer hall, in the basement. The restaurant featured a women's-only bar, which in the early 20th century was still relatively uncommon. As of 2019, the ground-floor space was occupied by a branch of bakery chain Ole & Steen, which also had a 225-square-foot (20.9 m^{2}) mezzanine above the ground floor.

The building's basement has a "Vault Museum", as well as the New York City office of Mountain Development Corporation. The "museum" contains artifacts from the Bryant Park Studios' last 123 years including: former tenants, such as art, letters, and pictures. It is open to the public but is not highly publicized, and visitors must request a tour in advance via email. The building's manager David Seeve gives tours to people every month; the visitors typically study art or history, or they may have read the landmark-designation plaque on the facade. The "Vault Museum" includes such items as the cafe's original tiling, an antique crystal fireplace, and a letter Irving Penn wrote to Mia Fonssagrives-Solow that was lodged in the mail chute for several decades.

==== Studios ====
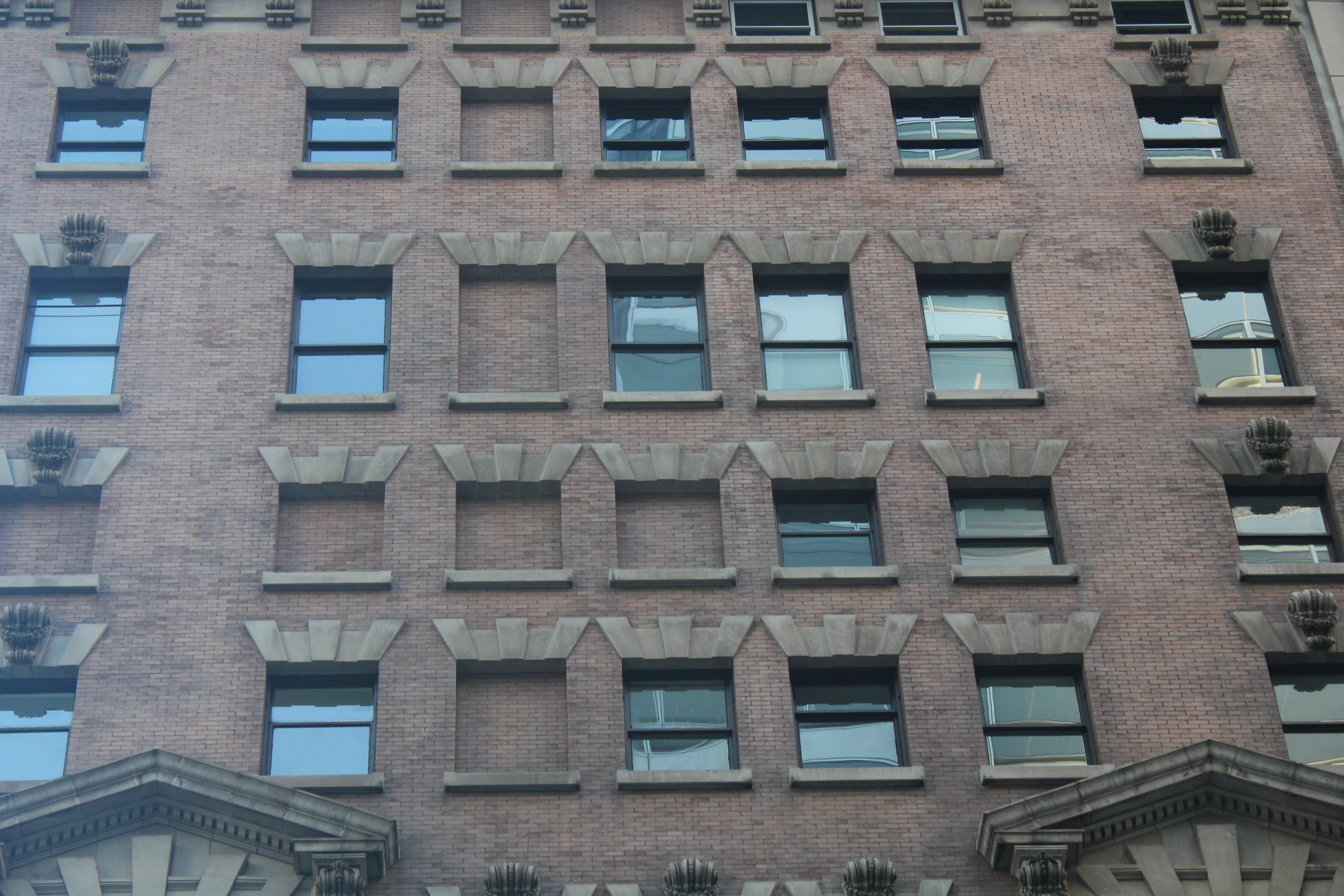
The Sixth Avenue elevation has mezzanines for the duplexes. Pictured from bottom to top are the sixth story, sixth mezzanine, seventh story, and eighth story.

The Bryant Park Studios building was designed with 40 units in single-story simplex and double-story duplex layouts. The 24 duplex studios all faced north toward the large windows on 40th Street. The site was at the southern end of Bryant Park, so sunlight could illuminate the windows even if taller buildings were erected nearby. Each full story is typically spaced 13 feet (4.0 m) apart. Many of the studios were overlooked by balconies on their southern ends. In addition, several floors were initially designed in an open plan so tenants could choose how to subdivide the space. A sample residence was that of portrait artist H. Stanley Todd, who had a two-story studio with a wooden fireplace, a mezzanine with bedrooms overlooking the studios, and a hallway connecting to a kitchen and studio room.

The building was also designed with two electric elevators, as well as a frame lift for hoisting picture frames. The passenger elevators are small, with the larger cab measuring 12.5 square feet (1.16 m^{2}). There was a freight lift in the back. A dumbwaiter brought food from the basement to each story.

Anderson maintained his own suite on the top two stories until his death in 1940. The penthouse spanned the western part of the building, and it had various antique items such as Spanish tapestries. The penthouse foyer, on the ninth story, had a floor covered in terrazzo tiles. It led to a reception room with white-and-gold decoration, tapestries, and a carved fireplace. The ninth-story bedroom was designed with pink-and-white decoration, and the adjacent dining room had green-and-gold Gothic decoration. Connecting the stories was a stair with wood banister. The studio at the center of the tenth floor measured 50 feet (15 m) square and 25 or 30 feet (7.6 or 9.1 m) high, with oak-paneled walls and ceilings, an organ in the wall, a large ceiling arch from a Venetian church, and an onyx-and-crystal fireplace. One bathroom had a floor surface made of cobalt blue tile and walls with abalone shells. There was also a skylight made of stained glass as well as a greenhouse for vegetables.

== History ==
Cooperative apartment housing in New York City became popular in the late 19th century because of overcrowded housing conditions in the city's dense urban areas. By the beginning of the 20th century, there were some housing cooperatives in the city that catered specifically to artists, including at 130 and 140 West 57th Street, as well as the West 67th Street Artists' Colony near Central Park. However, these were almost always fully occupied. The idea for the Bryant Park Studios in particular was devised by Abraham A. Anderson, an American who studied art in Paris during the late 19th century. He and his wife Elizabeth Milbank Anderson returned to the United States in the late 1890s, where they lived first in Manhattan and then in suburban Greenwich, Connecticut, after failing to find enough space in Manhattan.

=== 1900s and 1910s ===
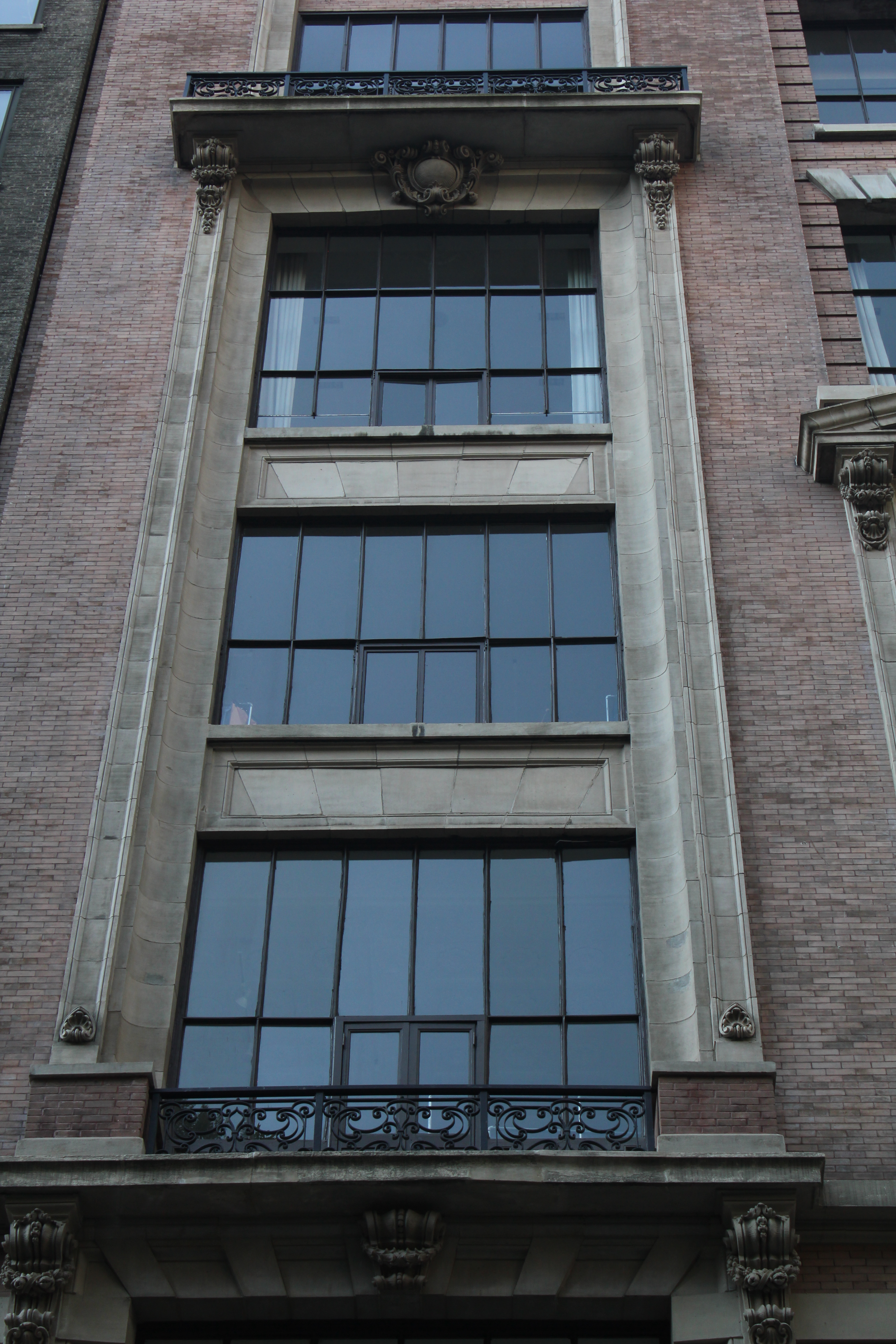
Large studio windows

In early 1900, Elizabeth Anderson acquired a site at the southeast corner of Sixth Avenue and 40th Street. The site was not near the traditional studio district around 57th Street, but it did benefit from proximity to the upscale residential district on Fifth Avenue. The site directly abutted the Sixth Avenue Elevated line, which devalued the site somewhat. A. A. Anderson reflected: "My business friends said it was a foolish thing to erect so expensive a studio building in what was then the 'tenderloin district'. But I wanted the best, since it is usually the best or the poorest that pays." By March 1900, excavations had commenced on the plot. Rich filed the building plans with the New York City Department of Buildings that month. During construction, in early 1901, a workman was killed by an elevator.

Once the building had been completed, in May 1901, Elizabeth transferred the new building to her husband for $300,000. The Bryant Park Studios, as well as the Knox Building on 452 Fifth Avenue, were among the earliest major developments on the surrounding stretch of 40th Street, which still mostly consisted of low-rise residences. In October 1901, the Bustanoby brothers leased the ground-floor and basement restaurant space. The Cafe des Beaux Arts opened the following year at the building's base. The cafe quickly became popular among "many men and women of society", as it was described in a 1905 Town & Country magazine article. The Bryant Park Studios was itself known as the Beaux Arts Building by the 1910s. The Bryant Park Studios housed not only visual artists, photographers, and decorators, but also doctors and dentists.

Louis Bustanoby sued two of his brothers, Andre and Jacques, over control of the Cafe des Beaux Arts in 1909. Louis alleged his brothers were trying to oust him from management. Anderson unsuccessfully tried to broker a compromise between the brothers. The restaurant went into foreclosure in December 1911 and a creditor was designated for the property. Ultimately, Louis gained control of the restaurant in February 1912. The same year, the A. J. Robinson Company was hired to modify a portion of the building. Anderson used his apartment to entertain high-profile guests, such as the prince of Monaco, as well as meetings for the Hunters' Fraternity of America, of which Anderson was president. By 1919, the Bryant Park Studios was described as being "known far and near as one of the New York places of amusement".

=== 1920s and 1930s ===
Anderson leased the building in April 1920 to L. K. Schwartz & Co. for 42 years at a total price of $3.5 million. The company had intended to add four stories to the structure and convert it to office use. Schwartz controlled the Beaux-Arts Building and Studio Corporation, which significantly increased the rents for several artists. This led tenant J. C. Leyendecker to sue the company in November 1920 on behalf of the building's thirty-six tenants. A municipal judge found that the company could not pass on the cost of an "unfavorable lease" to tenants. The Cafe des Beaux Arts was not affected by the lease and continued to operate. In 1922, the cafe was damaged in a flood when an ancient spring leaked through the floor. Afterward, the cafe floor was capped.

The Cafe des Beaux Arts only occupied the eastern part of the ground-story storefront by 1923. The western portion, measuring 45 by 60 feet (14 by 18 m), was leased that year to Joseph M. Nimhauser, who planned to alter the storefronts there. The same year, the mansard roof was added above the western portion of the building. The Sixth Avenue storefront was occupied by a barbershop for two decades. During Prohibition, the cafe was temporarily closed in March 1925 and banned from selling alcoholic beverages. Anderson still lived in his penthouse, having agreed in 1923 to lease the unit from his own tenant for $5,000 a year for five years. At the end of the five-year period in 1928, the Beaux-Arts Building Corporation tried to evict Anderson from his own apartment. Anderson unsuccessfully attempted to have the case heard in the New York Supreme Court rather than in the municipal court, but he won his lawsuit. The Beaux-Arts Club was shuttered for a year in late 1928 after violating Prohibition-related restrictions on alcohol sales.

The Beaux-Arts Building and Studio Corporation surrendered its lease to Anderson in January 1930. Ownership of the building passed to Anderson's daughter Eleanor A. Campbell in 1934. The building was damaged by a fire in 1936, which started in painter Leon Gordon's studio and then burned out Louis Herzog's and Anderson's units. Because of the large amount of water used in fighting the fire, some of the ceilings were also damaged. Among the non-residential tenants of this time was dentist Rodrigues Ottolengui.

=== 1940s to 1970s ===
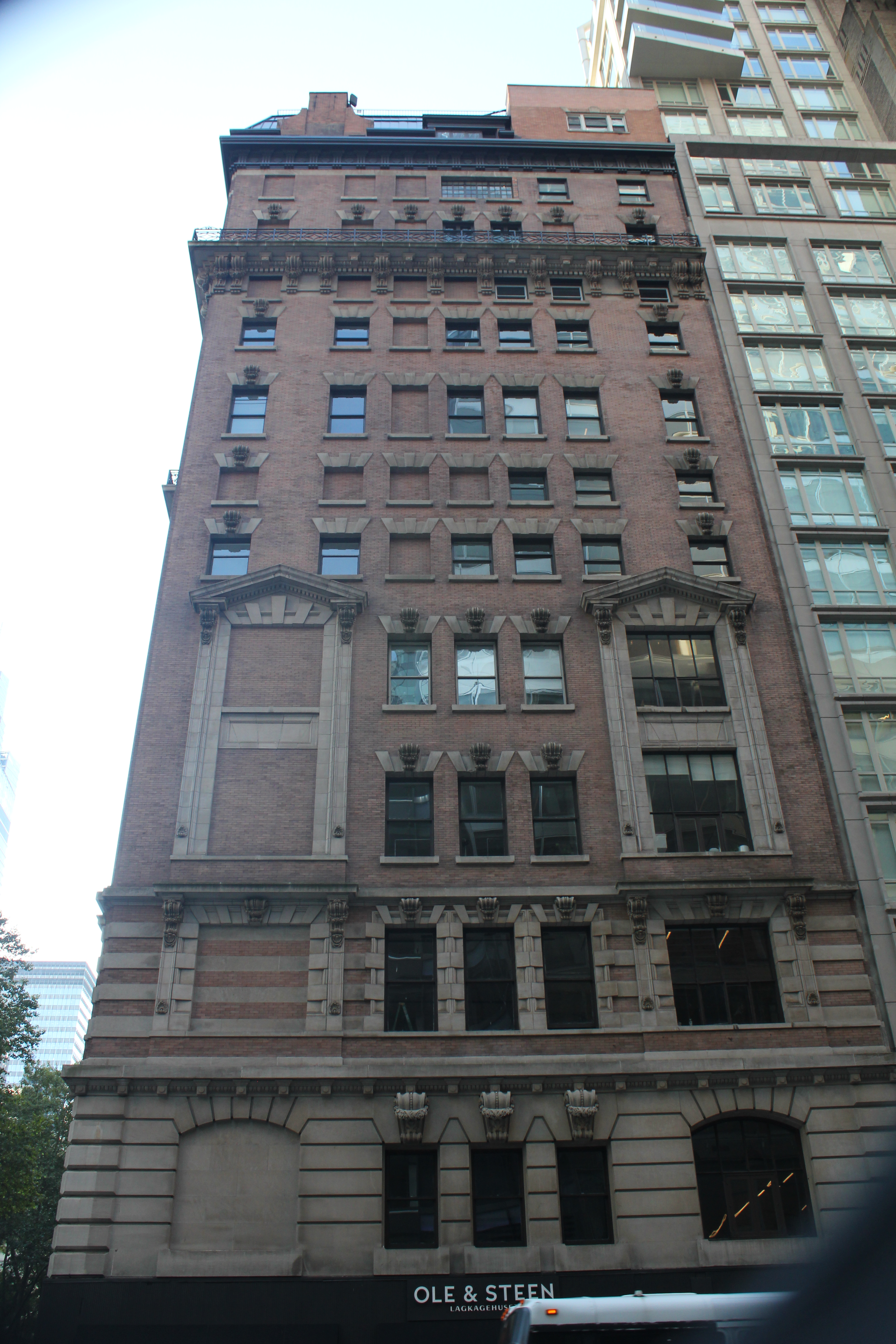
Seen from Sixth Avenue in 2021

Anderson died at his apartment in April 1940, and his funeral was held in his studio. The ground-floor and basement storefront at the corner with Sixth Avenue was leased in 1942 by Nedick's Stores Inc. That September, his daughter Eleanor transferred the building to the 80 West Fortieth Street Corporation. In 1943, the Greenwich Savings Bank acquired the building at auction on a bid of $425,000. Greenwich Savings Bank sold the building the next year to a client of the E. M. Simon Company. At the time, it was appraised at $515,000.

Anderson's old penthouse was rented in 1959 by the artist Dorothy Hart Drew. For several years, Drew was involved in a dispute with the owner about whether her residence could be considered a commercial space; she ultimately won that case. Drew continued to occupy the penthouse with her sister through the early 1990s. In the 1960s, the Bryant Park Studios were owned by Max Cohen, who died in 1968. By the 1970s, the building was being occupied by designers and garment companies. These included fashion designer Liz Claiborne, who founded Liz Claiborne Direct Brands in 1976 and occupied three stories before moving out during 1978. Fashion designer Donna Karan also had space in the building.

=== 1980s to present ===
L. Robert Lieb, of the New Jersey–based Mountain Development Corporation, (Note: A source from 2001 described Mountain Development as having purchased "a 140-year-old building overlooking Bryant Park", but the structure pictured is Bryant Park Studios, which was exactly one hundred years old at the time.) bought the building in 1980. (Note: Crain's New York cites a date of 1979, but the deed transfer occurred on February 11, 1980.) In the mid-1980s, Mountain Development subsidiary 80 West 40th Street Associates cleaned the facade and renovated the interior walls, dropped ceilings, lighting, and elevators. At the time, the building was fully occupied and had four retail tenants, as well as office tenants. The New York City Landmarks Preservation Commission held hearings in 1985 to determine whether to designate the building as a landmark. Stephen E. Gottlieb, speaking for the American Institute of Architects' New York chapter, said: "This is not your average Beaux Arts building [...] nor is it your average loft building." The LPC designated the building as a New York City landmark on December 13, 1988.

With residential tenants' leases expiring, Lieb started to renovate the building in the late 1980s so he could rent the space to fashion firms. As part of the project, the lobby's ceiling was restored, the window frames were repaired, and exterior air conditioners were removed. In addition, the facade was cleaned. The renovations cost $4.5 million. After designer Gordon Henderson opened a showroom in the building, ten firms followed. Though the owners offered low rents of $19 per square foot ($200/m^{2}), four of the Bryant Park Studios' ten floors remained empty until about 1992, when the nearby Bryant Park was renovated. Within a year, Mountain Development wrote seven leases covering nearly all of the vacant space, and asking rents had increased to $27 per square foot ($290/m^{2}). By 2002, the building was almost entirely composed of showrooms, but it was described in The New York Times as having "cheap-looking storefronts and roll-down gates".

At the beginning of the 21st century, the building was fully occupied, with law, financial, and technology companies all using the space. The building was renovated in 2008. By 2013, the Bryant Park Studios was charging rents of $60 per square foot ($650/m^{2}), a premium rate compared to the average rent of $45 per square foot ($480/m^{2}) for the neighborhood. Michael Seeve of Mountain Development, who coordinated day-to-day tenant operations, said his company sought to attract tenants working in similar industries. Tenants included Alice + Olivia within the ground story as well as fashion firms on upper stories. In 2019, Danish bakery chain Ole & Steen opened a restaurant space on the ground floor and adjoining mezzanine.

== Residents ==
The Bryant Park Studios' residents have included:

- Elizabeth Gowdy Baker, painter
- William Haskell Coffin, painter
- Jo Davidson, sculptor
- Barry Faulkner, painter
- Harrison Fisher, illustrator
- Emil Fuchs, painter and sculptor
- John La Gatta, illustrator
- Leon Gordon, painter
- Fernand Léger, painter
- J. C. Leyendecker, illustrator
- Gari Melchers, painter
- Irving Penn, photographer
- Frank H. Schwarz, painter
- Harrington Mann, portrait artist
- Kurt Seligmann, painter and engraver
- Edward Steichen, photographer
- Bert Stern, photographer
- Florine Stettheimer, painter

== See also ==
- List of New York City Designated Landmarks in Manhattan from 14th to 59th Streets
