= Louis H. Brush =

American newspaper publisher (1872–1948)

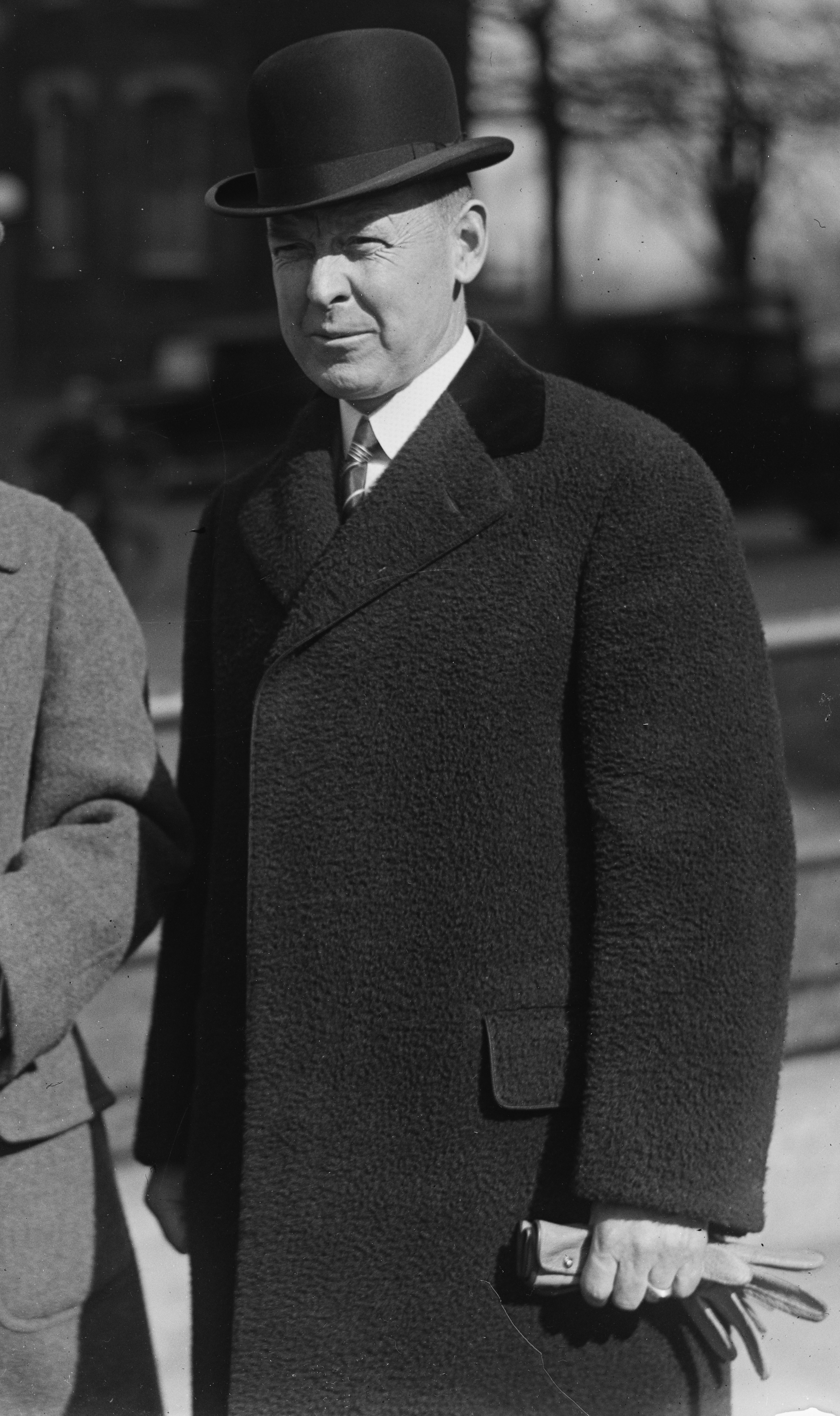
Brush in 1921

Louis Herbert Brush (January 24, 1872 – June 24, 1948) was an American newspaper publisher. After acquiring a series of Ohio newspapers he and his business partner Roy D. Moore purchased The Marion Star from US president Warren G. Harding in 1923. In 1927 he, Moore and William Henry Vodrey founded Brush-Moore Newspapers.

== Biography ==
Louis Herbert Brush was born on January 24, 1872 in Alliance, Ohio, to James Alpheus Brush (1834–1884) and Amelia McCall Brush (1838-1927). He had an older brother named Harlan W. Brush. Brush attended public schools in Alliance and graduated from Mount Union College (where his parents had been professors) in 1890 with a Bachelor in Arts degree. Afterward he was a first lieutenant in the Ohio National Guard. Brush married Maude Snowden Stewart on September 18, 1895, in Youngstown (where Maude had been born in 1870). Their son, Thomas Stewart Brush, was born in Salem, Ohio on July 12, 1896 and married novelist Katharine Louise Ingham in 1920 but divorced her in 1929. Brush lived in Salem for most of his life.

Brush was the circulation manager for the Ohio Sun in 1893. In 1895 Brush acquired the Salem News. He acquired the Liverpool Review in 1901 and the East Liverpool Tribune in 1920; he made his son the general manager of the latter newspaper. In 1922 he and several other newspaper publishers founded the Thompson-for-Governor Newspaper Club in support of Republican gubernatorial candidate Carmi A. Thompson. He met Roy D. Moore sometime after 1908 in New York City while Moore was working as a salesman for the International News Service.

In June 1923, Brush and Moore purchased The Marion Star from then-US president Warren G. Harding, two months before Harding's unexpected death. Harding, as well as William McKinley, William Howard Taft, Theodore Roosevelt, Calvin Coolidge and Herbert Hoover, were among Brush's personal friends. Around the same time, Brush and Moore acquired the Marion Tribune from L. S. Galvin and W. J. Galvin. In 1924, Time noted that The Marion Star, the East Liverpool Tribune, the Salem News and the East Liverpool Review comprised one of the prominent newspaper groups in the country, with a total circulation of 30,906. Brush and Moore then purchased The Canton Repository and The Steubenville Herald-Star. In 1927 Brush, Moore and William Henry Vodrey founded Brush-Moore Newspapers, Inc. from their holdings.

In 1935, Brush and Moore lost a case in which they requested to deduct a $13,300 yearly salary, which Harding would have received from The Marion Star had he lived to retire from the presidency, from Brush-Moore Newspapers' income tax; it was ruled that the salary was "capital outlay" that would remain taxable. On June 6, 1941, Brush and Moore were called up to testify to the Federal Communications Commission during a hearing to determine whether Chester A. Thompson should be allowed to give them his 50% share in the radio station WPAY; the FCC had accused Thompson of colluding with Brush and Moore, against public interests, to secure them full ownership of WPAY. Brush-Moore Newspapers already owned the other 50%. They denied any conflict of interest with Thompson; Brush, furthermore, said that WPAY’s affairs were Moore’s to deal with. The hearings concluded in August of 1941, but the FCC's ruling that the remainder of WPAY would be transferred to Brush-Moore was not made until April of 1944. In 1946, Brush stepped down from president of Brush-Moore Newspapers to chairman of its board of directors; Moore succeeded Brush as president.

Brush was a Republican, a member of the Methodist Episcopal Church and a Knight Templar Mason of the Mystic Shrine of Cleveland. He was vice president of the Ohio Mutual Insurance Company. On June 23, 1948, Brush suffered a cerebral hemorrhage in his friend Henry A. Hurst's apartment in Philadelphia, Pennsylvania after falling ill at the Republican National Convention; he died on June 24 at Hahnemann University Hospital, at the age of 76. The funeral took place on June 26 in Salem, Ohio, and his remains were interred in Grandview Cemetery. His son had died in 1938 in a Tucson, Arizona sanitorium after being ill for four years. Maude Brush died on August 18, 1966; she was 95. Brush was inducted, along with newspaper publisher William O. Littick and sports journalist Hugh S. Fullerton, Sr., into the Ohio Journalism Hall of Fame in 1956.

== Works cited ==
- Upton, Harriet Taylor (1909). A Twentieth Century History of Trumbull County, Ohio: A Narrative Account of Its Historical Progress, Its People, and Its Principal Interests. Whipporwill Publications.
- Stewart, Robert (1907). Colonel George Steuart and His Wife Margaret Harris: Their Ancestors and Descendants with Appendixes of Related Families, a Genealogical History. Printed at the "Civil and military gazette" Press.
- The Fourth Estate: A Weekly Newspaper for Advertisers and Newspaper Makers. E. F. Birmingham. 1922.
- Broadcasting Publications, Inc. (April 24, 1944). Broadcasting and Broadcast Advertising 1944-04-24: Vol 26 Iss 17. New Bay Media LLC.
