= Daniel Reed (actor) =

American actor

- Circa 1952
- Born: July 12, 1892; Denver, Colorado
- Died: February 9, 1978 (aged 85); Montrose, New York
- Occupation(s): Actor, playwright, screenwriter
- Spouse: Isadora Bennett
- Children: Susan Reed (singer); Jared Reed (actor)

Daniel A. Reed (July 12, 1892 – February 9, 1978) was an American actor, playwright, and screenwriter.

== Biography ==
Reed was born July 12, 1892, in Denver, Colorado. He took to theatre in 1912. He developed his own one-man show based on Edgar Lee Masters Spoon River Anthology. In Chicago he married Isadora Bennett in 1918. Together they founded Town Theatre in Columbia, South Carolina.

In 1930, he was a MacDowell colonist. He spent a few years in Hollywood as a dialect coach, eventually settling in New York in 1936 as an actor.

He was awarded the Outer Critics Circle Award in 1950 for his role as the Postman in Come Back, Little Sheba.

He died February 9, 1978, in Montrose, New York.

== Plays ==
- Black April, an adaptation of the novel by Julia Peterkin
- Scarlet Sister Mary (1929), an adaptation of the Pulitzer Prize winning novel by Julia Peterkin
- Goodbye in the Morning (1930)

== Filmography ==
=== Film credits ===
- Maybe It's Love (1935) (dialogue director)
- Madame DuBarry (1934) (dialogue director) (uncredited)
- The Dragon Murder Case (1934) (dialogue director)
- Fog Over Frisco (1934) (screenwriter, dialogue director)
- Young Man of Manhattan (1930) (screenwriter, dialogue director)
- Jimmy the Gent (1934) (dialogue director)
- Queen High (1930) (dialogue director)
- The Sap from Syracuse (1930) (dialogue director)

=== Television appearances ===
- Kiss Her Goodbye (1959) (actor)
- Goodyear Television Playhouse (1 episode, 1951) (actor)
- Armstrong Circle Theatre (1 episode, 1950) (actor)
- The Chevrolet Tele-Theatre (2 episodes, 1950) (actor)
