= Young Man of Manhattan =

1930 film

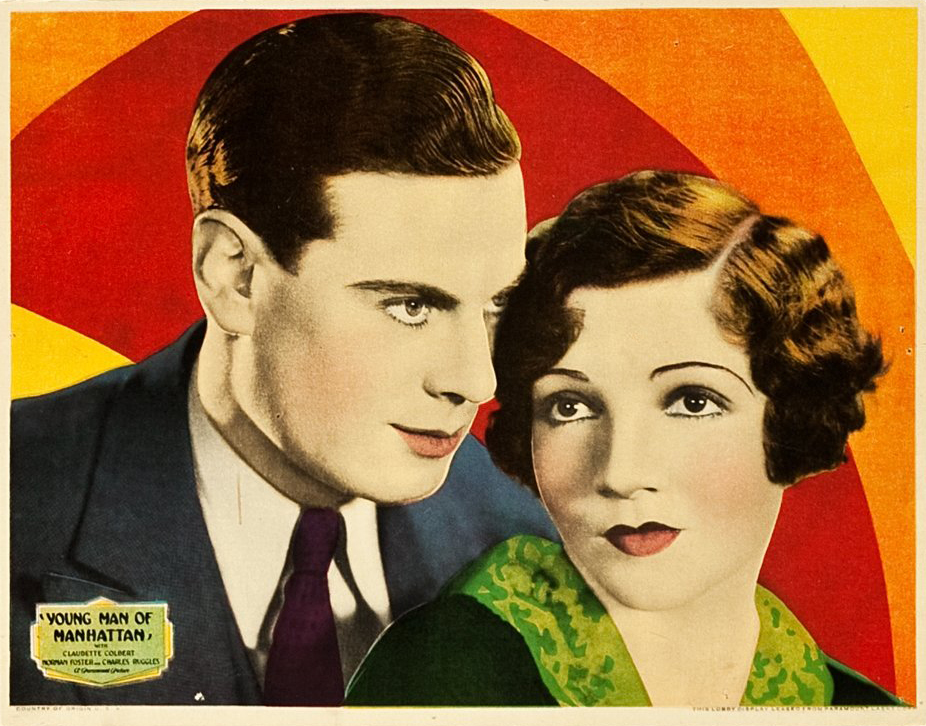
- Lobby card
- Directed by: Monta Bell
- Written by: Daniel Reed; Robert Presnell Sr. (adaptation)
- Based on: Young Man of Manhattan by Katharine Brush
- Produced by: Monta Bell
- Starring: Claudette Colbert; Norman Foster; Ginger Rogers; Charles Ruggles
- Cinematography: Larry Williams
- Edited by: Emma Hill
- Music by: Sammy Fain; Pierre Norman; W. Raskin
- Production company: Paramount Pictures
- Release date: May 17, 1930
- Running time: 79 minutes
- Country: United States
- Language: English

Young Man of Manhattan is a 1930 American pre-Code musical comedy film directed by Monta Bell and starring Claudette Colbert, Norman Foster, Ginger Rogers, and Charles Ruggles. Made by Paramount Pictures, it was set and filmed in New York City. It was the feature film debut of Ginger Rogers.

== Synopsis ==
Tensions begin to build between a couple when the wife begins to earn more and become more successful than her husband, an ambitious sportswriter. Puff Randolph, an emancipated girl who pursues the journalist with her advances, creeps in between the two. Her line "Cigarette me, big boy" became a catchphrase in America when the film came out.

== Cast ==
- Claudette Colbert as Ann Vaughn
- Norman Foster as Toby McLean
- Ginger Rogers as Puff Randolph
- Charles Ruggles as Shorty Ross
- Leslie Austin as Dwight Knowles
- Lorraine, Aileene, Fern, and Harriet Aalbu as the Sherman Sisters (credited as Four Aalbu Sisters)
- H. Dudley Hawley as Doctor
- Jack Dempsey as Jack Dempsey (archive footage) (uncredited)
- Maynard Holmes as Football Game Spectator (uncredited)
- John MacDowell as Undetermined Role (uncredited)
- Tom Reilly as Referee (archive footage) (uncredited)
- Gene Tunney as Gene Tunney (archive footage) (uncredited)

== Production ==
Young Man of Manhattan was based on Katharine Brush's story of the same name that was first published as a serial in The Saturday Evening Post. The film was shot at Astoria Studios in Queens.

== Music ==
- "I Got 'It'" - Ginger Rogers
- "Good and Plenty Of" - Ginger Rogers

== Influence ==
The film inspired the 1930 Vincent Youmans song "Say, Young Man of Manhattan" from his stage musical Smiles. The song was performed by Ginger Rogers' future co-star Fred Astaire. Ginger Rogers' line "Cigarette me, big boy!" became a popular saying in the early 30s.

== See also ==
- His Girl Friday
- Woman of the Year
