= Susan Reed (singer) =

- Born: Susan Catherine Reed; January 11, 1926; Columbia, South Carolina, US
- Died: April 25, 2010 (aged 84) Greenport, New York, U.S.
- Genres: Folk music
- Occupations: Singer, musician
- Years active: c.1945 – 1960s
- Labels: RCA Victor, Columbia, Elektra

Susan Catherine Reed (January 11, 1926 – April 25, 2010) was an American singer, harpist, and zitherist. A regular on the New York folk scene, Life magazine dubbed her "the pet of Manhattan nightclubbers" in 1945.

== Life and career ==
She was born in Columbia, South Carolina, the daughter of Isadora Bennett and Daniel Reed, respectively a theater publicist and actor. Folk music collector Carl Sandburg and musician Huddie Ledbetter were family friends, as were visiting Irish actors and musicians from the Abbey Theatre Company. After she moved to New York City with her family – including her older brother Jared, who also performed – she began singing and playing the zither, harp and autoharp at private parties and for wounded soldiers convalescing in hospitals. Although she originally aspired to becoming a painter, she was discovered by Barney Josephson, owner of the Café Society club in Greenwich Village, who booked her to appear there.

Her performances of folk ballads and other traditional songs found immediate success, and she appeared on radio and TV shows with Burl Ives. She made her debut at the Town Hall in New York in 1945, at the age of nineteen, followed by a national tour. In 1947, Alan Lomax wrote of her, with Ives, Woody Guthrie and Josh White, as one of the foremost performers in the "enthusiasm for native balladry and folklore that is running through the country from coast to coast". In 1948, she appeared with Gene Krupa in the film Glamour Girl (retitled Night Club Girl in the UK), in which she played a folk-singing country girl brought to sing in New York nightclubs. The movie directly inspired English folk singers Shirley and Dolly Collins.

Reed appeared regularly on TV and radio in the early and mid 1950s, and recorded for the Columbia, RCA Victor, and Elektra record labels. Her albums included an adaptation of Joseph Canteloube's Chants d'Auvergne (Songs of the Auvergne, 1950), Susan Reed Sings Old Airs from Ireland, Scotland and England (1954) and Susan Reed (1956). She also acted on TV, and appeared on Broadway in Shooting Star, a musical about Billy the Kid.

Her popularity diminished as her relatively mannered singing style became less fashionable; according to Bruce Eder at Allmusic, "she was neither fish nor fowl, too pop for the most serious folk audiences and too folky for mainstream audiences..". In the late 1950s she ran afoul of the House Un-American Activities Committee, and was blacklisted as a communist sympathiser. She married actor James Karen in 1958; they had one child before divorcing in 1967. She ended her career in the early 1960s.

She established an antiques shop in Greenwich Village, and later sold ethnic handicrafts and clothes in Nyack, New York. She still gave occasional performances into the 2000s. In 2006, her recordings for Elektra were reissued on CD.

She died in 2010 at a Long Island nursing home, at the age of 84.

== Discography ==
- Folk Songs and Ballads (RCA Victor, 1948)
- Songs of the Auvergne (Columbia, 1950)
- Susan Reed Sings Old Airs from Ireland, Scotland and England (Elektra, 1954)
- Susan Reed (Elektra, 1956)
- Songs for the Wee Folk (Elektra, 1959)

== Filmography ==
- Glamour Girl (1948 Feature Film)
- Goodyear Television Playhouse – "The Inward Eye" (1954 TV episode)
