= Oxnard Press-Courier =

Newspaper published in Oxnard, California from 1899 to 1994

- Front page of January 2, 1994 issue
- Type: Daily newspaper
- Owner(s): Thomson Newspapers (1967-94); Brush-Moore Newspapers (1963-67); George Grimes (1945-63)
- Founder: Whitmore Brothers
- Founded: 1899
- Ceased publication: June 16, 1994
- Language: English
- Headquarters: Oxnard, California; United States
- Circulation: 17,325 (1992)

The Oxnard Press-Courier was a newspaper published in Oxnard, California, United States. It originated in 1899 and ceased after 95 years in 1994.

== History ==
On January 8, 1899, the first edition of the weekly Oxnard Courier was published by the Whitmore brothers. In 1907, John Ray Gabbert, a recent college grad and former editor of The Daily Californian, leased the paper. In 1908, Charles A. Whitmore, whose father founded the paper and helped him operate it, started his own paper called the Corcoran Courier. In 1909, the Oxnard Courier expanded into a daily. In January 1912, Gabbert disposed of his interests in the Oxnard paper to Rex B. Kennedy, but bought it back six days later. Gabbert then sold the Courier again to Frederick O'Brien in October 1912, who six months sold it to James J. Krouser in April 1913.

A month later, brothers F.W. "Bill" and T.A. Train launched a rival paper called the Oxnard News. In 1915, the Trains sold the News to brothers E.E. and L.O. Carlson. It's unclear it the deal went through. In 1916, T.A. Train sold his half-interest to W.C. Black. In 1918, the News was consolidated into the Courier.

In 1937, Dan W. Emmett, former publisher of the Ventura Free Press, founded another rival paper called the Oxnard Press. In 1940, Krouser sold the Courier to Emmett, who then merged it with the Press to form the Oxnard Press-Courier. The paper was purchased by brothers George and Russell Bennitt in 1943, followed by George G. Grimes and David Calvert in 1945. Under the new ownership, Grimes and his wife Eva grew the circulation from 1,200 to 16,000. The couple was aided at the paper by their four sons: Lee, Thomas M., George E. and David C.

In 1963, the Grimes family sold Press-Courier to Brush-Moore Newspapers. G.G. Grimes died a year later. In 1967, Thomson Newspapers paid $72 million for 12 papers owned by Brush-Moore, including the Press-Courier. Years later the paper faced stiff competition from the Ventura County Star and Los Angeles Times and after three decades Thomson decade to cease publication of the Press-Courier in June 1994.

== 1940s Associated Press dispute ==
A U.S. District Court in Los Angeles awarded the Associated Press a $3,780 judgement against Press-Courier publisher Dan W. Emmett on June 20, 1942, for attempting to withdraw from the A.P. without giving two years' notice as required by the association's bylaws. Judge Leon R. Yankwich stated that when Emmett refused to accept service and, without notice, failed to pay his weekly assessment, he became liable for 104 weeks' assessments in a lump sum based on the rate Emmett paid in May 1940 when he entered the contract.
