= Colony Arcade Building =

Building in Manhattan, New York

- U.S. National Register of Historic Places
- New York State Register of Historic Places

- Location within Manhattan Location within New York City Location within New York Location within the United States
- Location: 63–67 W. 38th St., Manhattan, New York, US
- Coordinates: 40°45′09″N 73°59′07″W
- Area: 0.3 acres (0.12 ha)
- Built: 1913
- Architect: Frederick Zobel
- NRHP reference No.: 14000580
- NYSRHP No.: 06101.018002

Significant dates
- Added to NRHP: September 10, 2014
- Designated NYSRHP: July 9, 2014

The Colony Arcade Building is a hotel building at 63–67 West 38th Street in the Midtown Manhattan neighborhood of New York City, New York, United States. Designed by Frederick C. Zobel, it was constructed between 1912 and 1913 as a commercial and industrial building. The facade rises 13 stories and is made of brick, terracotta, granite, and cast iron, divided into three horizontal sections similar to the components of a column. Inside, the building spans 128,000 square feet (11,900 m^{2}) and has 200 hotel rooms. The building is on the National Register of Historic Places.

The building was constructed following the development of mass transit in the Garment District. Five sites were acquired for the building in early 1912, and its first tenants, including a series of hat manufacturers, moved in the next year. For much of the 20th century, the building served fashion firms. In 2013, it became a hotel called the Refinery Hotel.

== Description ==
The Colony Arcade Building is at 63–67 West 38th Street in the Midtown Manhattan neighborhood of New York City, New York, United States, between Fifth Avenue to the east and Sixth Avenue to the west. Designed by Frederick C. Zobel, the building occupies a site on the northern side of 38th Street, where the front elevation of the facade has a frontage of approximately 62 feet (19 m). It extends 197 feet (60 m) through the block to the rear elevation on 39th Street, where the frontage measures 46 feet (14 m) wide. The structure is surrounded by other loft buildings, some of which are part of the Garment Center Historic District. At the eastern end of the same block is the Lord & Taylor Building. Other nearby buildings include the Springs Mills Building across Sixth Avenue to the northwest, and Bryant Park Studios one block north.

=== Exterior ===
The Colony Arcade Building was built as a 12-story structure, but it has since been expanded to 13 stories due to the presence of a roof terrace. On both the 38th and 39th Street elevations of the facade, the articulation consists of three horizontal sections similar to the components of a column (namely a base, shaft, and capital). The 38th Street elevation is divided vertically into two single-width outer bays, which flank two wider, triple-width inner bays in an A-B-B-A pattern. On 39th Street, there is only one wide bay in between the two narrow bays, arranged an A-B-A pattern. The western and eastern elevations are made of red brick with limited windows, and the western elevation has a deep light well.

The base of both sections is three stories high and is made of terracotta and granite, with spandrels of cast iron between windows on different stories. On 38th Street, the ground (first) floor has Neo-Gothic archways in the outer bays, decorated with eagles, shields, corbels, and gables; these entrances have metal-and-glass doors beneath transom windows. The ground floor's center bay has a storefront, and the entrance to the main lobby has a glass-and-metal awning extending above it. The ground level on 39th Street is similar in decoration; there is a central ground-level storefront, along with an awning above an entrance in one of the outer bays. The second and third stories of both elevations have windows. On 38th Street only, there are quatrefoil spandrels above the ground floor; paneled spandrels above the second floor; and a cornice with protruding piers, quatrefoil spandrels, shields, gables, and other decoration above the third floor.

The shaft is a seven-story section measuring seven stories high, while the capital is two stories high and has terracotta decoration. Both the shaft and capital have sheet-copper spandrels, which are present only in the wider central bays. The shaft's central bays are separated from each other and the outer bays by brick piers; the shaft's outer bays are relatively simple, with plain lintels and windowsills. The capital has elaborate decorations in all bays, such as decorative two-story piers protruding from the facade, which have motifs such as gables, quatrefoils, acanthus leaves, lattices, and geometric designs. Above the twelfth story are more acanthus motifs, followed by a roof balustrade.

=== Interior ===
The building spans 128,000 square feet (11,900 m^{2}). The ground floor's interior has a hotel lobby facing 38th Street and a restaurant facing 39th Street, a holdover from the building's original mix of retail and commercial space. The lobby has a vaulted ceiling, and there is a reception desk inspired by a sewing machine. The building's original means of circulation, a hallway, remains intact on the east side of the building. Some of the elaborate plasterwork ceilings also remain standing, as they have been hidden above dropped ceilings, but other decorations have been removed where the ceiling has been exposed. The modern-day hotel has two bars, one of which is on the building's ground floor.

Two stairways, a freight elevator, and three passenger elevators traverse the building. The upper stories are arranged around U-shaped corridors. The central north–south wing is lined with rooms only on one side, while the west–east corridors at each end have rooms to both the north and south. There are 197 guestrooms, which generally retain their original ceilings. Other parts of the interior lack their original decorations. The hotel's decorations include walls with hat-shaping apparatus, and a carpet with scissors-and-spool motifs, coffee tables shaped like carts, and floor lamps.

There is a roof terrace, which was built in 2013, along with bulkhead structures on the roof. This roof terrace, spanning 3,500 square feet (330 m^{2}), was built atop the existing 12-story structure and has terracotta floor tiles and brick walls, along with a movable skylight. The terrace contains a bar called the Refinery Rooftop.

== History ==
Detail of the westernmost bay at ground level

The development of mass transit in the Garment District, including the nearby Pennsylvania Station and the IRT Sixth Avenue Line's 38th Street elevated station, prompted loft development in the area. Just before the Colony Arcade Building was constructed, the site had three existing four-story houses: 63 West 38th Street, owned by J. E. Serre, and 65 and 67 West 38th Street, owned by M. J. Parrott. The adjoining property at 62 and 64 West 39th Street was owned by Judson I. Todd. This site was particularly desirable because it was right outside the 38th Street station and was to be served by a proposed extension of the Hudson & Manhattan Railroad's Uptown Hudson Tubes, though the latter was ultimately never built.

=== Industrial use ===
In January 1912, all five sites were sold to Judson I. Todd of the Holland Holding Company. It was immediately thereafter sold to the Colony Construction Company, led by Max Solomon. That March, Solomon filed plans for the Colony Arcade Building, a 12-story loft building on the site, to be designed by Frederick C. Zobel. The building was originally planned for light manufacturing before being changed into a storage facility. By 1913, the Colony Arcade Building was in use and was occupied by a series of hat manufacturers. The commercial space was first occupied in 1914, when the ground story and basement were leased to a restaurant. By then, the proximity of the 38th Street station and the brand-new Lord & Taylor Building were credited with having attracted patronage to the area.

Initially, there was a tea salon at the ground story, while the floors above were used for manufacturing and garment industry–related industries. The building was sold in 1922 to Levy Brothers, at which point it was occupied exclusively by milliners. During Prohibition in the United States, the building hosted illicit bars. The building was owned by Colony Arcade Inc. by 1952, when the owner took out a $97,500 mortgage loan on the building. For much of the 20th century, the building continued to house various garment-related companies, along with ribbon shop Hyman Hendler & Sons. The Hollywood Reporter retrospectively described the building as a "hat factory".

By 1981, the building was owned by Melohn Properties. That year, Melohn sought to evict the twelve remaining hatmakers to make way for office space. While many of the hatmakers ultimately remained, by the 1990s the building housed only two millinery companies; many of its other tenants dealt with accessories, fabrics, and trimmings.

=== Hotel conversion ===
By 2005, the owner, The Daten Group, was planning to sell the building for at least $50 million. Equity firm Savanna placed a $45.75 million loan on the building in 2008, and the structure subsequently became the Refinery Hotel, which opened in 2013. As part of the renovation, the architectural firm Stonehill & Taylor decorated the hotel with industrial-looking motifs alluding to the building's history. The building was added to the National Register of Historic Places on September 10, 2014. In 2021, the developers of the Refinery Hotel sold the site's air rights to the developers of the nearby Xadia Hotel for $11 million; this transaction allowed the Xadia Hotel's developers to include additional floor space in their building. Morgan Stanley provided a loan of about $90 million to refinance the hotel in 2024.

== See also ==
- National Register of Historic Places listings in Manhattan from 14th to 59th Streets

== Sources ==
- National Register of Historic Places Inventory/Nomination: Colony Arcade Building (Report). National Register of Historic Places, National Park Service. 2014.
