= Times-Standard =

Newspaper covering the far North Coast of California, United States

- Type: Daily newspaper
- Format: Broadsheet
- Owner: Digital First Media
- Founder: Edwin D. Coleman
- Publisher: John Richmond
- Editor: Ruth Schneider
- Founded: 1854
- Language: English
- Headquarters: 930 6th Street; Eureka, California 95501 United States
- Circulation: 13,556 (as of 2016)
- OCLC number: 27389437
- Website: times-standard.com

The Times-Standard is a local daily newspaper covering the far North Coast of California. Headquartered in Eureka, the paper covers all of Humboldt County while providing partial coverage of neighboring Del Norte, Mendocino, and Trinity counties. The newspaper is one of the oldest continuously published papers in all of California.

The Times-Standard is owned by Digital First Media which is controlled by Alden Global Capital.

== History ==
=== Humboldt Times ===
On Sept. 2, 1854, Dr. Edwin D. Coleman printed the first issue of the Humboldt Times. The weekly newspaper began publishing in what is known today as Old Town Eureka. Coleman failed to receive the letters "u" and "v" in a type font set he ordered from a merchant, so he replaced them with "w"s and similar letters in the first edition. After several markets folded in Eureka and the city failed to become the county seat, Coleman moved the paper on Dec. 16, 1854 to Union, now called Arcata. On Dec. 22, 1855, Coleman sold the business to Walter Van Dyke and Austin Wiley. Van Dyke served as editor until Jan. 23, 1858, when he transferred his shares to Wiley and returned to working as an attorney.

Wiley moved the Times back to Eureka on Aug. 28, 1858 and sold the paper to Van Dyke and L.M. Burton on Jul 14, 1860. Burton quickly withdrew and was replaced by Stephen Girard Whipple, who became the sole owner on March 30, 1861. He retired a year later and sold the paper to Wiley and Walter Boball, followed in 1864 by J.E. Wyman, Esq. After his death in 1880, his son W.H. Wyman managed the Times for a few years until it merged with another paper and briefly became the Times-Telephone, run by Wiley and Mr. Henry. In 1886, a corporation who placed Whipple in charge. At that time the paper had a circulation of 1,250. In 1892, Whipple sold the Times to E.N. Borg.

In November 1931, a fire destroyed the paper's office and caused $200,000 worth of damage. At that time the owners were Ralph W. Bull. and John H. Crothers.

=== Humboldt Standard ===
In 1875, R.V. Chadd, former owner of the Sutter Creek Independent, founded the Humboldt Standard in Eureka. The paper ceased after less than two years and was relaunched in 1877 by William Ayres who renamed it to the Democratic Standard. In 1883, R.L. Thompson bought the paper and placed his brother F.P. Thompson in charge. It was then renamed back to the Humboldt Standard. J.F. Thompson purchased a half-interest in 1888 and. A year later became the sole owner. At that time the circulation was 840.

In 1916, F.W. Georgeson became the paper's editor. He had been a part owner for several years prior and also had severed as president of the Humboldt County Bank and mayor of Eureka. In April 1931, Georgeson sold the paper to Clarence L. Day for $200,000. The Georgeson family had published the paper for the past four decades. In 1934, an unknown assailant fired two bullets through the a window at the paper's office in an attempt to kill managing editor Donald O'Kane. In 1935, Day died of a sudden heart attack and ownership of the paper was passed to his widow. Kane was then made publisher.

=== Times-Standard ===
On May 1, 1941, Donald O'Kane, who owned the Humboldt Standard, and John H. Crothers, who owned the Humboldt Times, merged their businesses together as a means to reduce cost. Both papers shared a printing plant but kept separate newsrooms and editorial policies. Crothers sold out to O'Kane in September 1946.

In April 1966, O'Kane sold the Times and Standard to Brush-Moore Newspapers. The papers were later merged and the name was changed to The Times-Standard on June 1, 1967. A month later the company was bought for $72 million by Thomson Newspapers. At the time it was believed to have been the biggest newspaper sale in U.S. history and the Justice Department filed an anti-trust lawsuit to stop the sale but later dropped it.

According to an older version of the newspaper's "about us" section of its web page, moving day came on December 7, 1968. Staff writer Andrew Genzoli later recalled, "There hadn't been so much excitement in the newsroom since Pearl Harbor".

Thomson owned the Times-Standard until 1996 when it was bought by MediaNews Group, who sold it to Digital First Media in June 2016. Digital First Media is owned by Alden Global Capital.

From 2003 to 2008, the Times-Standard was the subject of vigorous competition through the establishment of another daily newspaper, The Eureka Reporter. But, Humboldt County and other areas of the North Coast (reached by local papers), though quite large in geographical terms, is a small population area to feature two daily newspapers. As a result, in late 2008 (after a brief period of reduced publication), The Eureka Reporter announced that it would cease operations.

In 2012, The Times-Standard ceased printing a Monday edition, publishing Monday news exclusively online. In 2020, the newspaper decommissioned its in-house Eureka printing press and began delivering copies to Humboldt County from Chico, California.

== Awards ==
- The Times-Standard received the Newspaper Association of America's Award of Excellence in the 2008 Media Innovation Awards competition.
