= Isadora Bennett =

American publicity agent (1900–1980)

- Circa 1962
- Born: July 21, 1900; Canton, Missouri
- Died: February 8, 1980 (aged 79); New York, New York
- Occupation(s): Publicity agent, theatre manager
- Spouse: Daniel Reed
- Children: Susan Reed (singer); Jared Reed (actor)

Isadora Bennett (July 21, 1900 – February 8, 1980) was an American publicity agent for modern dance theatre. Her work has been considered significant for establishing modern dance. Her clients included Martha Graham, José Limón, José Greco, American Ballet Theatre, Royal Danish Ballet, Joffrey Ballet.

== Biography ==
Born from Clarence and Catherine Bennett, actors, she went with her parents on tour as a young child. At age 5, she moved in with an aunt in Springfield, Illinois. She took an early interest in the literary life, and there she befriended Vachel Lindsay and Edgar Lee Masters. At age 14, she received a scholarship to the University of Chicago. In 1916, she became a reporter for the Chicago Daily News, where she befriended Carl Sandburg, then still a reporter. In 1918, she married Daniel Reed (but would keep her maiden name professionally).

The Reeds moved to Columbia, South Carolina, and founded the Town Theatre. They would move around, settling permanently in New York City in 1936.

There she became a theatrical and dance publicity agent. In 1939, Martha Graham became her client, and would stay with Bennett until 1970. She became partners with theatrical agent Richard Pleasant. Together they would also manage McCarter Theatre in Princeton, and arranged to have Broadway bound shows premiere there.

She published occasional essays on dance for the general public under the pseudonym Weylan Morgan.

She retired in 1972.

== Awards ==
- 1962, Dance Magazine Award (with Margot Fonteyn and Bob Fosse)
- 1973, Capezio Dance Award
