= The Marion Star =

Newspaper in Marion, Ohio

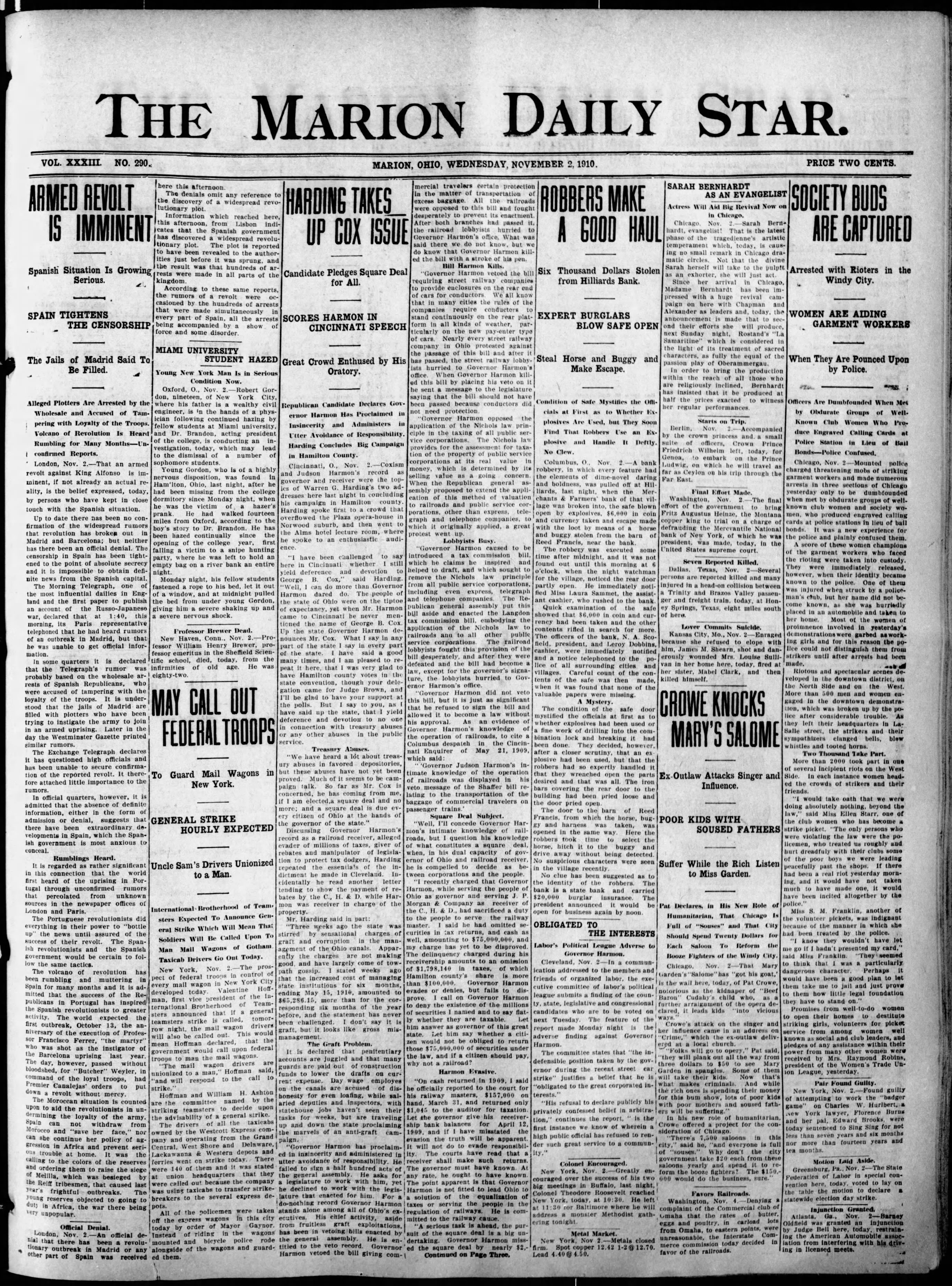
- (top) Present-day logo (bottom) November 2, 1910 front page
- Type: Daily newspaper
- Format: Broadsheet
- Owner(s): USA Today Co., formerly Gannett
- Founder(s): Sam, Willis and Harry Hume
- Founded: 1877
- Language: English
- Headquarters: 163 E. Center St., Ste. 100; Marion, Ohio 43302; United States
- Circulation: 6,416 morning 8,073 Sunday (2012)
- ISSN: 1087-7495
- OCLC number: 18114262
- Website: marionstar.com

The Marion Star (formerly known as The Marion Daily Star and founded as the Marion Daily Pebble) is a daily newspaper in Marion, Ohio, United States. The paper is owned by USA Today Co., formerly the Gannett Newspaper organization. Founded in 1877 by Sam Hume and his sons Willis and Harry, it struggled financially in its early years and went insolvent in 1884. After the business was put up for auction at a sheriff's sale, it was purchased by future United States president Warren G. Harding and two of his friends, John O. Sickle and Jack Warwick (the former of whom left shortly after the purchase). Harding brought commercial success to the Star by improving the office equipment, soliciting classified advertisements and adding more content to the newspaper.

He owned it until June of 1923, when he sold the business to Roy D. Moore and Louis H. Brush, who later founded Brush-Moore Newspapers from the Star and several other Ohio newspapers they had acquired. After Harding's death in August of 1923, banker Frank A. Vanderlip accused Moore and Brush of having bribed Harding into selling them the newspaper; Moore and Brush sued Vanderlip for libel, and Vanderlip paid them a settlement in 1925. In 1928, the US Senate conducted an investigation into allegations that Harding had invested the money he received from the Star's sale in missing oil bonds; the allegation was proved false within days.

The Star was acquired by Thomson Newspapers in 1967; its name was changed to simply The Star in 1994, but was reverted to The Marion Star in 1996. In 2000, the Gannett Company purchased the Star and twenty other Thomson newspapers. During Harding's ownership, the Star often praised the Republican Party and opposed alcohol prohibition, but under Gannett it has claimed to be politically neutral. The Star is the only extant newspaper in Marion County, Ohio.

== Current operations ==
Gannett reported in 2012 that the print version of The Marion Star had a circulation of 6,416 for the morning edition and 8,073 for the Sunday edition. In 2007 it reported that the Star had 66 employees. As of 2026 the Star has two reporters: Abby Bammerlin for news and Rob McCurdy for sports. A person can buy either a digital-only subscription or a print-and-digital subscription, both of which will give him complete access to The Marion Star's website. Special print editions come out on Thanksgivings and up to twice every month.

== History ==
=== Early history (1877–1884) ===
The Marion Daily Pebble was founded in 1877 by Sam Hume, a lumber salesman who had moved from Pleasant Township, Ohio to Marion, and his young sons Willis and Harry. Sam, Willis and Harry had previous but trivial experience in publishing, and Sam Hume thought that the city of Marion "needed a daily". Sam Hume's wife, Maria P. Hoxter, proofread the newspaper. The paper changed its name shortly after its creation to The Marion Daily Star.

Despite its name, the Marion Daily Star usually sent out only twice a week. Having the paper delivered to one's home cost ten cents, and picking it up at the post office cost seven. The newspaper's editorials and features were comedic, but because readers had limited interest in the comedy, the business began to struggle financially. It was described in business magazine The World's Work as having been a "hell-box full of pied type and a broken-down press" during that time.

In 1884, the Humes sold the newspaper to Ben Dempster and moved to Indiana. Dempster sold it to Kelley Mount, but Mount, after alienating many of the paper's subscribers because of his outspoken praise for James G. Blaine and obsession with writing on politics, resold it to Dempster in the same year. According to Warren G. Harding, Dempster put the Star, which by then had gone insolvent, up for auction at a sheriff's sale. Harding's father, George Tryon Harding, bought it with real estate instead of cash, paid off its debts and gave his son ownership of the newspaper. George Tryon Harding claimed that he himself never had any influence or control over the editorial policy of the Star. Warren lost his proprietorship shortly thereafter, when "[a] judgment was entered in court against some of the property Harding's father had traded for the paper".

=== Management by Warren G. Harding (1884–1923) ===
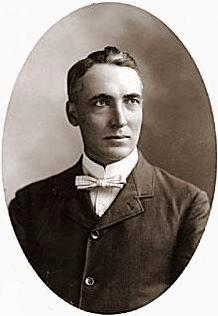
Warren G. Harding in 1882, aged 17

Later in 1884, an eighteen-year-old Warren Harding, along with his friends John O. Sickle (Note: Sometimes given as Sickel.) and Jack Warwick, repurchased The Marion Daily Star for either $300 or $450 (Harding's recollection of the price varied). It is not clear whose money bought the newspaper. George may have paid for it, or Warren, Sickle and Warwick may have pooled their money. Harding named the business under which he published the Star the Star Publishing Company; it later became the Harding Publishing Company. Within weeks after the purchase, Sickle, frustrated with the poor quality and difficulty of the printing equipment available at the office, quit. Warwick, though, kept a job at the Star as a rewrite man.

Harding began editing at the newspaper immediately after he acquired it. Harding was responsible for writing, proofreading, typesetting and printing the newspaper, and for managing the business component of it; Warwick assisted him in proofreading, typesetting and printing. Harding furnished the headquarters with new printing presses, a telephone and a telegraph, and hired reporters so that he could spend his time requesting advertisements and writing editorials instead of doing the reporting himself. Warwick got into an argument with Harding over Harding's decision to install the telephone, but remained with the newspaper until he found a new job at the Toledo Blade in 1904.

Harding believed that classified advertisements were an important aspect to a newspaper's financial success and ability to beat competition. His preferred method of convincing people to pay to put advertisements in the Star was to meet with them personally and explain the advantages of advertising in a newspaper. He paid the Star's staff better than competitor newspapers paid their own staff, which kept his employees satisfied and deterred strikes.

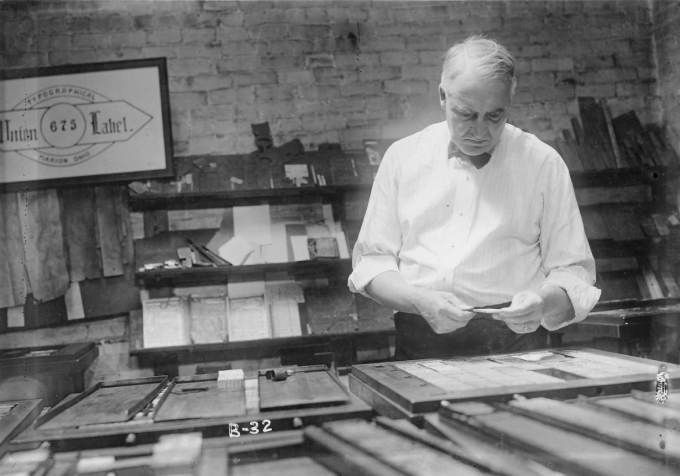
Harding working at The Marion Star

Harding increased the length of the Star from four pages to an average of fourteen, with a comic strip and extra pages on Saturdays. The paper's circulation increased from 1,000 to 15,000, it began to publish six days each week instead of semiweekly and by 1885 it had financially recovered; sometime before he was nominated presidential candidate, Harding jested to a man who offered to buy the newspaper from him that it would cost $200,000. However, his success as an editor took a toll on his health; he was hospitalized five times between 1889 and 1901 at the Battle Creek Sanitorium for reasons his biographer, Andrew Sinclair, described as "fatigue, overstrain, and nervous illnesses". Florence Kling, who became Florence Harding after Warren married her in 1891, acted as the Star's business manager and accountant but did not influence the actual editing or publication of the newspaper.

The Star encouraged industrialists to make improvements to the city of Marion, including through the development of new railroads; it supported the Black Diamond railroad, which was to send coal to Marion from Coshocton County mines. The railroad was never completed, and after the project's failure became apparent Harding denounced Albert E. Boone, the railroad's original proponent. In 1890, Harding wrote in the Star that promoting Marion, which was not legally a city, to the status of a city would permit its municipal government to pave the then-dirt streets properly, because only a city council could handle the expenses to do so. On April 7 of that year, the majority of Marion citizens voted to make Marion a city. The pavement project was delayed by several years, after Harding wrote an editorial on April 9 that disparaged wealthy people who did not want the pavement.

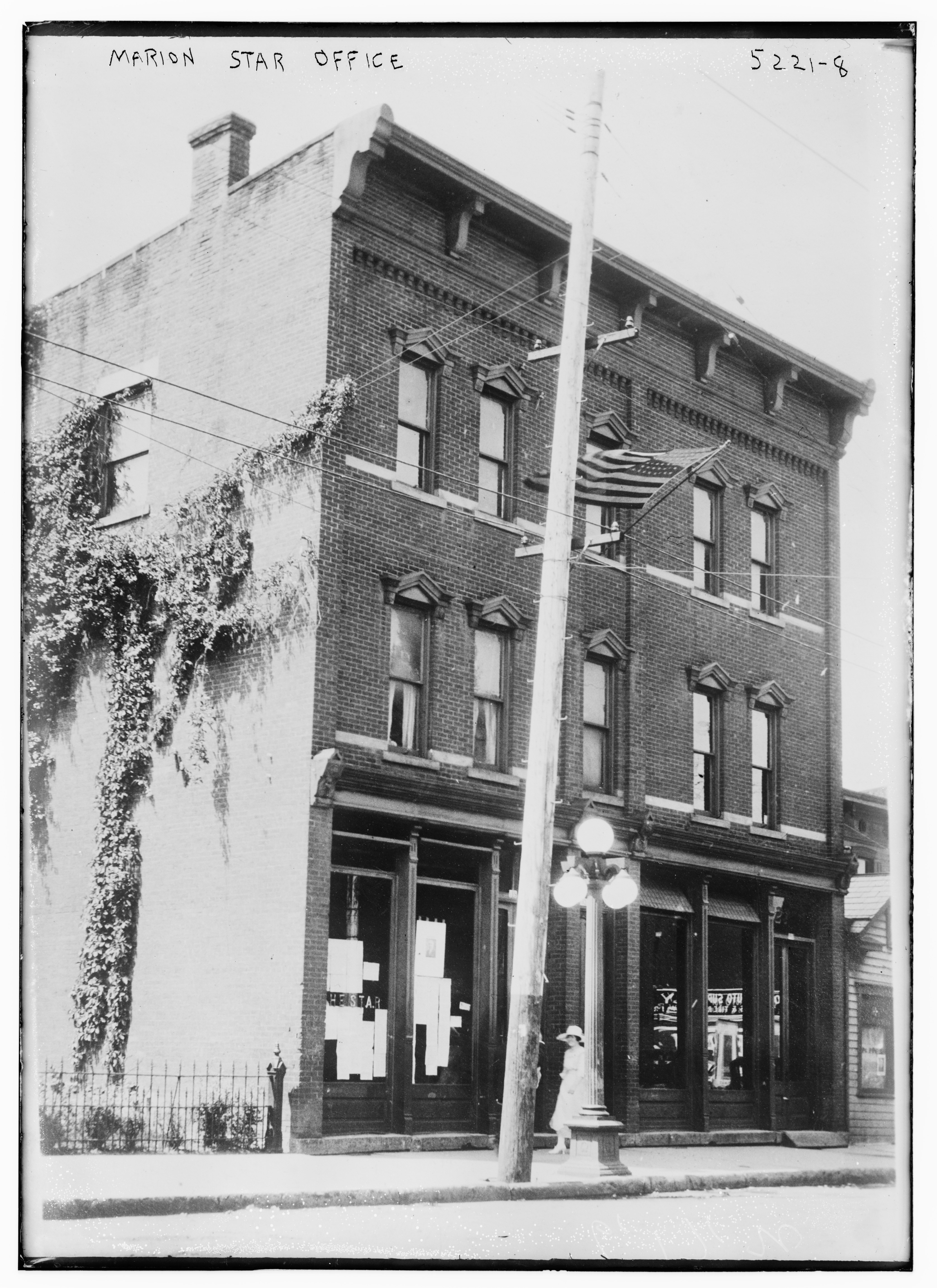
Office of The Marion Daily Star in 1915

Later in the 1890s, Harding and George Crawford, publisher of the Independent (a competitor to the Star), insulted and degraded each other via their own editorials. After Crawford published one in 1894 referring to Harding as a "moral leper" by whom "[s]ome of the best men in the city have been assailed", Harding called Crawford a "lickspittle organ" and a "parasite" in return. James H. Vaughn, the publisher of another competitor, the Democratic Mirror, accused Harding's father of being black ("woolly-headed"); Harding responded, "The Mirror grows amusing on the subject of wool. The suspicion is abroad that Colonel Vaughn has been chased by a vicious ram".

The Star reported on Harding's campaigns for US senator in 1914 and United States president in 1920. When Harding announced his campaign for senatorship in May of 1914, the Star wrote that "[his] assurance of support come from every class, every faction and every locality in the state... The home sentiment is apparently very favorable to the candidacy". In July of 1920, the Star claimed that the ceremony in which Harding was formally notified of his selection as the primary Republican candidate for president "was the most notable exercise of its kind in history and drew more people than any similar ceremony within memory". On October 4, 1920, the Star published an opinion piece by Gifford Pinchot in which he explained why he wanted Harding to become president.

After Harding won the presidential election on November 2, employees of the Star gifted him a golden printer's rule and gave Florence a flower bouquet. A few weeks afterward, Harding announced at a meeting with shareholders that, because he could not simultaneously work full-time at the Star and fulfill his obligations as president, he would give up his responsibilities as editor. Harding was sad to retire; he claimed that he loved the Star as if it were "a part of [his] body" and that he had had no regrets in becoming a newspaper publisher. One of the last columns he wrote for the Star celebrated the centennial of Marion's founding.

=== Ownership by Brush-Moore Newspapers (1923–1967) ===
Harding retained ownership of the Star until June of 1923, when he sold the business to Louis H. Brush and Roy D. Moore (who also purchased the Marion Tribune around the same time) for $480,000, although he intended to remain a stockholder and keep writing editorials for it. Two months later, on August 2, 1923, Harding fell ill and died unexpectedly while in San Francisco, California. The Star's obituary of Harding on August 3 stated that "[w]ith a profound feeling of personal loss... the national capital was plunged into deepest mourning today as it awaited the return of [Harding's] body". On that day, the Star also published an editorial about Harding's death, titled "Greatest and Best Beloved".

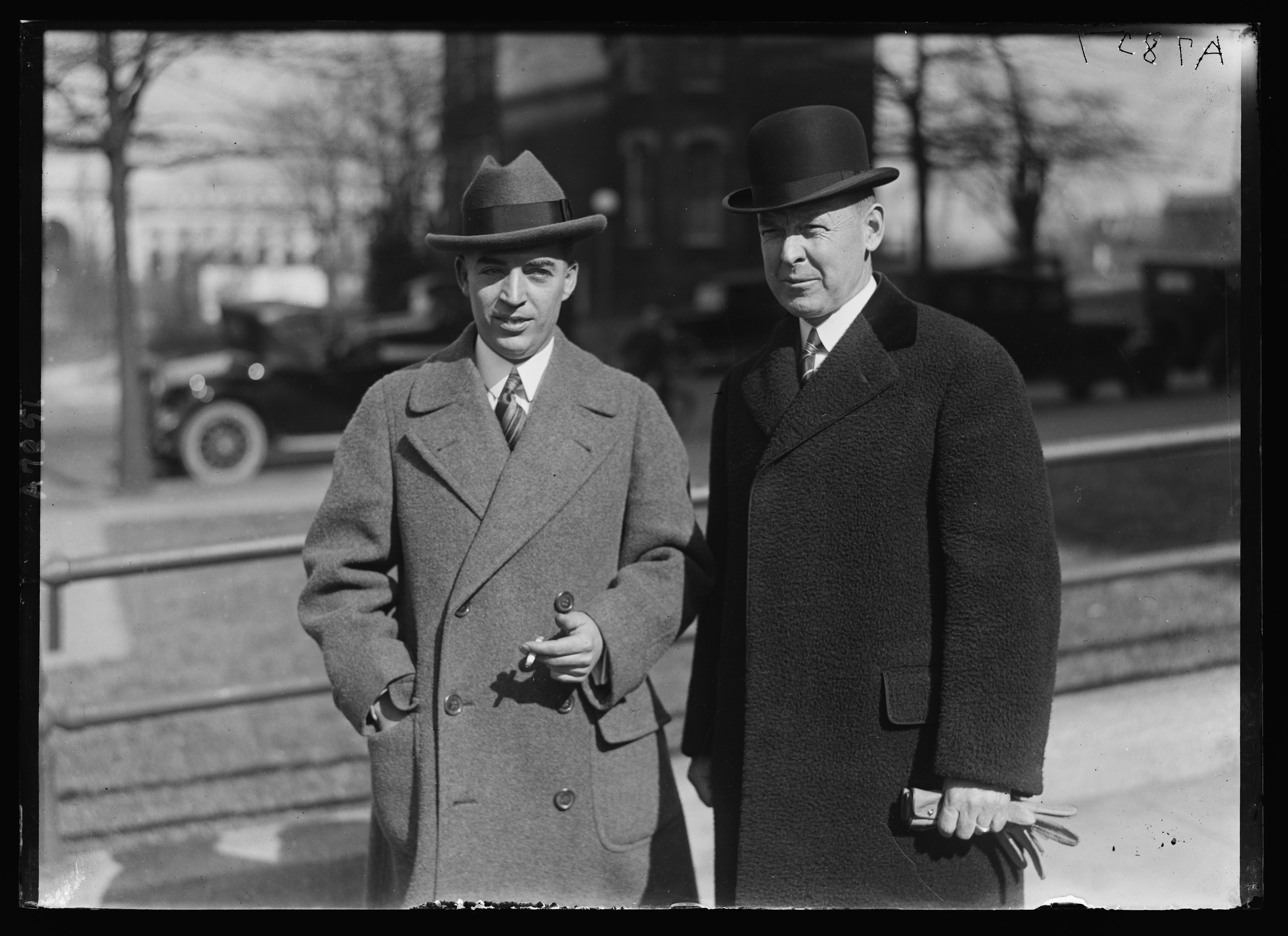
Roy D. Moore (left) and Louis H. Brush (right)

In February of 1924, Brush and Moore filed a libel lawsuit against banker Frank A. Vanderlip, seeking 1.2 million dollars in damages. Vanderlip had alleged in the New-York Tribune that the $480,000 that Brush and Moore had given Harding was a much higher amount than the newspaper's supposed actual value of $200,000, meaning that they had bribed Harding into selling them the Star. The case was settled in January of 1925 with Vanderlip paying an undisclosed amount of money to Brush and Moore. The Marion Daily Star became The Marion Star some time thereafter. Brush and Moore founded Brush-Moore Newspapers, which included the Star and the Marion Tribune, with William H. Vodrey in 1927.

In March of 1928 the Senate reopened the investigation into Harding's sale of The Marion Star, at the same time it was investigating the Teapot Dome scandal, due to allegations that Harding had invested the money he received from selling the Star in oil bonds from Continental Trading Co. that were now missing. George H. Van Fleet, an editorial writer for the Star, denied that Harding had invested in those securities and dismissed the allegations as a posthumous smear campaign against Harding. It was found a few days later that Harding could not have purchased the oil bonds, because the serial numbers of the ones he had purchased did not correspond to the Continental ones. In 1935, Brush and Moore made a request to the Board of Tax Appeals that they be permitted to deduct a $13,300 annual salary, which Harding would have received from The Marion Star had he lived to retire from the presidency, from their income tax; they claimed that Harding's estate had been using legal threats to make them pay the salary out to them. The Board, however, denied the request after finding that the salary was "capital outlay".

=== Later history (1967–present) ===
Thomson Newspapers acquired Brush-Moore Newspapers in 1967 for 72 million dollars, whereupon The Marion Star became part of the Thomson Newspaper chain, which already possessed 23 newspapers in the United States and 26 in Canada. At the time, this was the most expensive sale of a newspaper group in history. Printers of the Star and of five other Thomson newspapers went on strike in 1976, causing a decrease in the Star's circulation to 18,366 in 1978 from about 23,000 in 1969. In 1994, Thomson Newspapers changed The Marion Star's name to simply The Star. The change was reversed in 1996; Tim Dowd, its then-publisher, stated that he wanted readers to continue associating The Marion Star with the city of Marion.

In June of 2000, the Gannett Company, which has since 2025 been USA Today Co., purchased Thomson's Central Ohio group of eight newspapers (including the Star), plus 13 other Thomson papers. The headquarters of The Marion Star since the 1920s, on Court Street, were sold to developer Lois Fisher in 2013; since then the Star has been based on 163 East Center Street. Since 2014, the Star and other Ohio newspapers in the USA Today Co. network have been printed by the Dispatch Printing Company in Columbus, Ohio. In 2015, nine awards from the annual Associated Press Media Editors (APME) contest in Columbus were given to journalists of The Marion Star; the Star was also third place in the APME's General Excellence category. The APME lauded the Star for "outstanding journalism" in 2021 and, again, gave it third place in General Excellence in 2022. The Marion Star is, as of 2020, the only extant newspaper in Marion County. In April 2024, The Marion Star switched from carrier to postal delivery, as its website had grown more popular, and thus more profitable to maintain, than its print edition. The Marion Public Library maintains a microfilm collection of the Star for public research; the paper is also accessible for a monthly subscription fee through Newspapers.com and NewspaperArchive.

== Political views ==
Harding refrained from letting his Republican political views dictate the Star, because he thought that a conspicuous political slant would ruin its profits by offending Democratic and nonpartisan readers. Though it often praised the Republican Party and repeated many of Harding's political views, it never scorned the Democratic Party. The Marion Star gave no commentary about the 1885 or 1887 gubernatorial elections of Ohio.

In the 1880s during the temperance movement, the Star repeated Harding's belief that, if the government wanted people to stop drinking alcohol, it would be more effective to tax people for alcohol than to ban it altogether. Harding supported the Dow Law, an act created in 1886 by Ohio governor Joseph B. Foraker that taxed alcohol vendors a yearly $100 or $200 depending on whether they sold wine/beer or liquor. A September 10, 1886 editorial in the Star opined that the only reason prohibitionists opposed the Dow Law was "the fallacious idea that taxing the liquor traffic legalizes it".

The Marion Star claimed in a list of ethical policies in December 2023 that it, like all other USA Today Co. publications, would not and would never endorse or financially support any political parties, candidates or campaigns, nor allow its staff (barring opinion and editorial writers) to publicly express their political beliefs.

== Other notable staff ==
- Gary Abernathy – Political commentator who was a city editor for the Star between 1991 and 1993.
- Norman Thomas – American Civil Liberties Union founder and Socialist candidate for President; during his youth, he delivered The Marion Daily Star's papers.

== Works cited ==
- Hall, Sheryl Smart (January 23, 2019). Warren G. Harding & the Marion Daily Star: How Newspapering Shaped a President. Arcadia Publishing. ISBN 978-1-62584-942-7.
- Pietrusza, David (April 21, 2009). 1920: The Year of the Six Presidents. Basic Books. ISBN 978-0-7867-3213-5.
- China Monthly Review (1923). Millard's Review of the Far East.
- Cuneo, Sherman A. (1922). From printer to president. Philadelphia, Dorrance.
- Downes, Randolph C. (Randolph Chandler) (1970). The rise of Warren Gamaliel Harding, 1865-1920. [Columbus] Ohio State University Press. ISBN 978-0-8142-0140-4.
- Adams, Samuel Hopkins (1939). Incredible Era: The Life and Times of Warren Gamaliel Harding.
- Chapple, Joe Mitchell (1920). Warren G. Harding--the man. Boston, Chapple publishing company, limited.
- Sinclair, Andrew (1969) [1965]. The Available Man: The Life behind the Masks of Warren Gamaliel Harding (1st Quadrangle Paperback ed.). Chicago: Quadrangle Books. OCLC 422550801.
