= Ole & Steen =

Danish bakery chain

Lagkagehuset
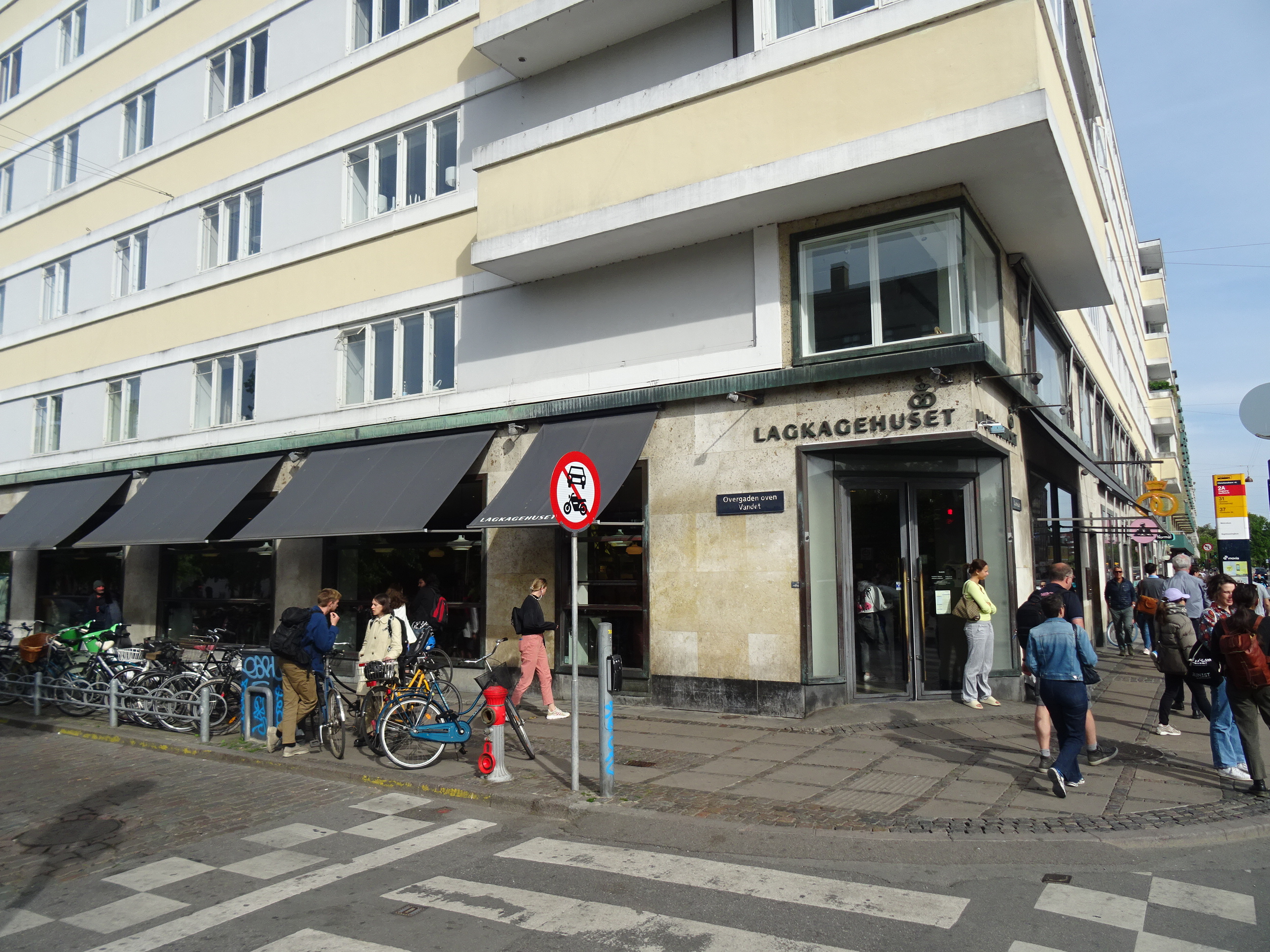
- The first branch of Lagkagehuset in Copenhagen
- Trade name: Ole & Steen
- Native name: Lagkagehuset
- Industry: Bakery
- Founders: Ole Kristoffersen; Steen Skallebaek
- Headquarters: Copenhagen, Denmark
- Number of locations: 143 (2024)
- Area served: Denmark; United Kingdom; United States
- Key people: Jason Cotta (CEO)
- Owners: Nordic Capital (80%); L Catterton (20%)
- Number of employees: ≈2,700 (2020)
- Website: lagkagehuset.dk

Lagkagehuset (Danish: [ˈlɑwkʰɛːjəˌhuˀsð̩]; trading as Ole & Steen [ˈoːlə ʌ ˈste̝ˀn] in English-speaking countries) is a Danish bakery chain with over 143 branches in Denmark, England, and New York City.

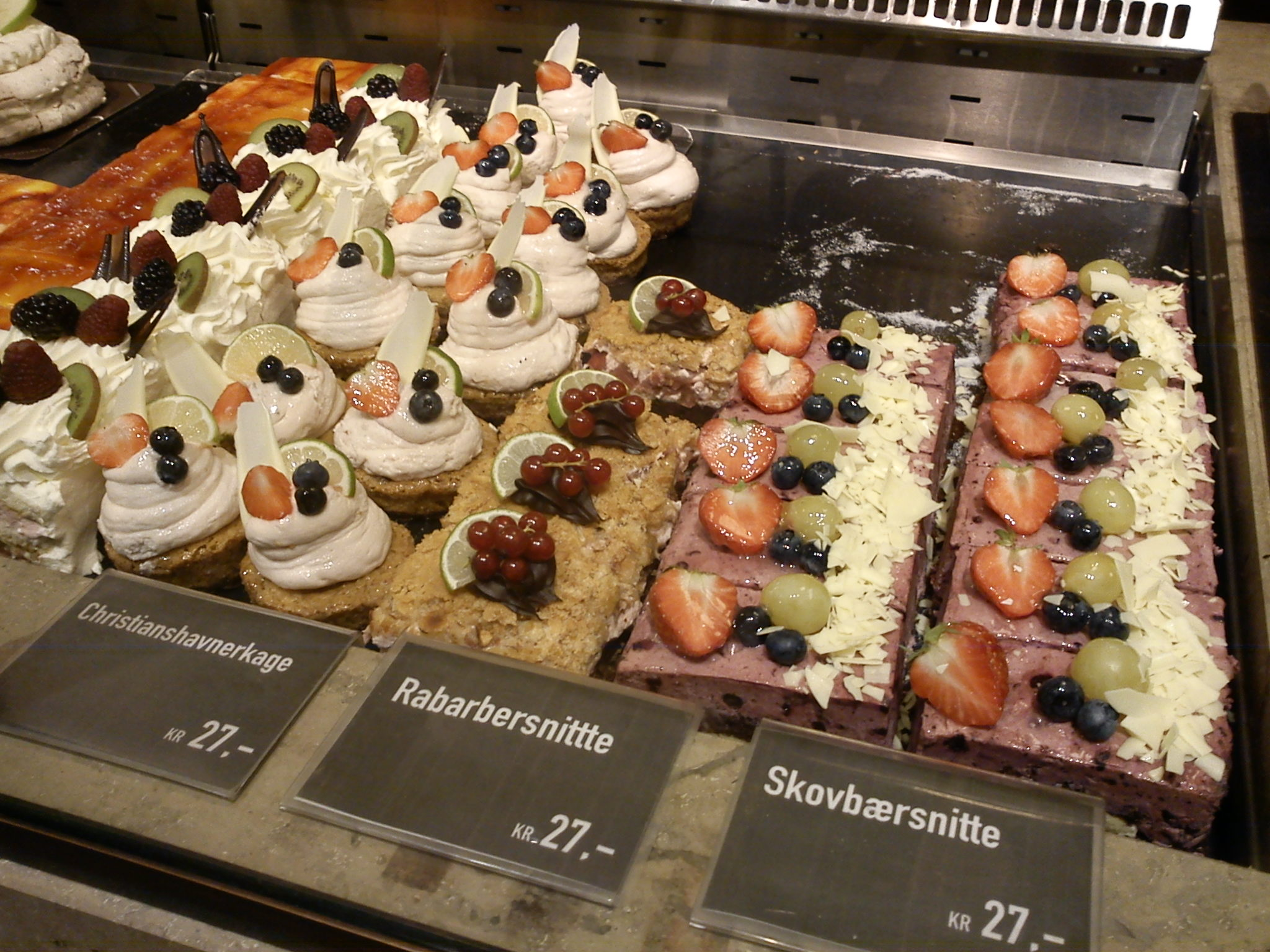
Cream cakes on sale (2015 in Denmark)

The present-day business was formed in 2008 through a merger of Ole Kristoffersen and Steen Skallebaek's bakeries, both founded in the early 1990s. Originally owned by private equity firm FSN Capital, it was sold in 2017 to Nordic Capital for a reported kr. 1,000,000,000. Kristoffersen and Skallebaek stepped down from the board at the time of the sale. Later that year, L Catterton acquired a 20% stake. The current CEO is Jason Cotta, former managing director of Costa Coffee in the United Kingdom.

In May 2020, the company came under social media scrutiny about their ownership structure and allegations this might enable tax avoidance. The controversy emerged in connection with their receipt of funding from the Danish coronavirus relief package. This prompted the company to issue their accounts early, indicating domestic tax payment.
