= Brush-Moore Newspapers =

American newspaper group

- Industry: Media
- Founded: 1927
- Founders: Louis H. Brush; Roy D. Moore; William H. Vodrey
- Defunct: 1967
- Fate: Acquired by Thomson Newspapers

Brush-Moore Newspapers, Inc. was a United States newspaper group based in Ohio. It was founded by Louis H. Brush, Roy D. Moore and William H. Vodrey in 1927, four years after Brush and Moore purchased The Marion Star from US president Warren G. Harding. The business acquired a number of newspapers and radio stations from both Ohio and other US states during its 40 years of existence. Brush-Moore Newspapers' 72-million-dollar sale to Thomson Newspapers in 1967 was at the time the most expensive newspaper transaction in history.

== Background ==
Louis Herbert Brush was born in 1872 in Alliance, Ohio. He graduated from Mount Union College with a bachelor's degree in arts. Before he founded Brush-Moore Newspapers he had owned the Liverpool Review and the East Liverpool Tribune, which he acquired respectively in 1901 and 1920. He joined the Salem News (of Salem, Ohio) as a manager in 1894 and purchased it in 1897.

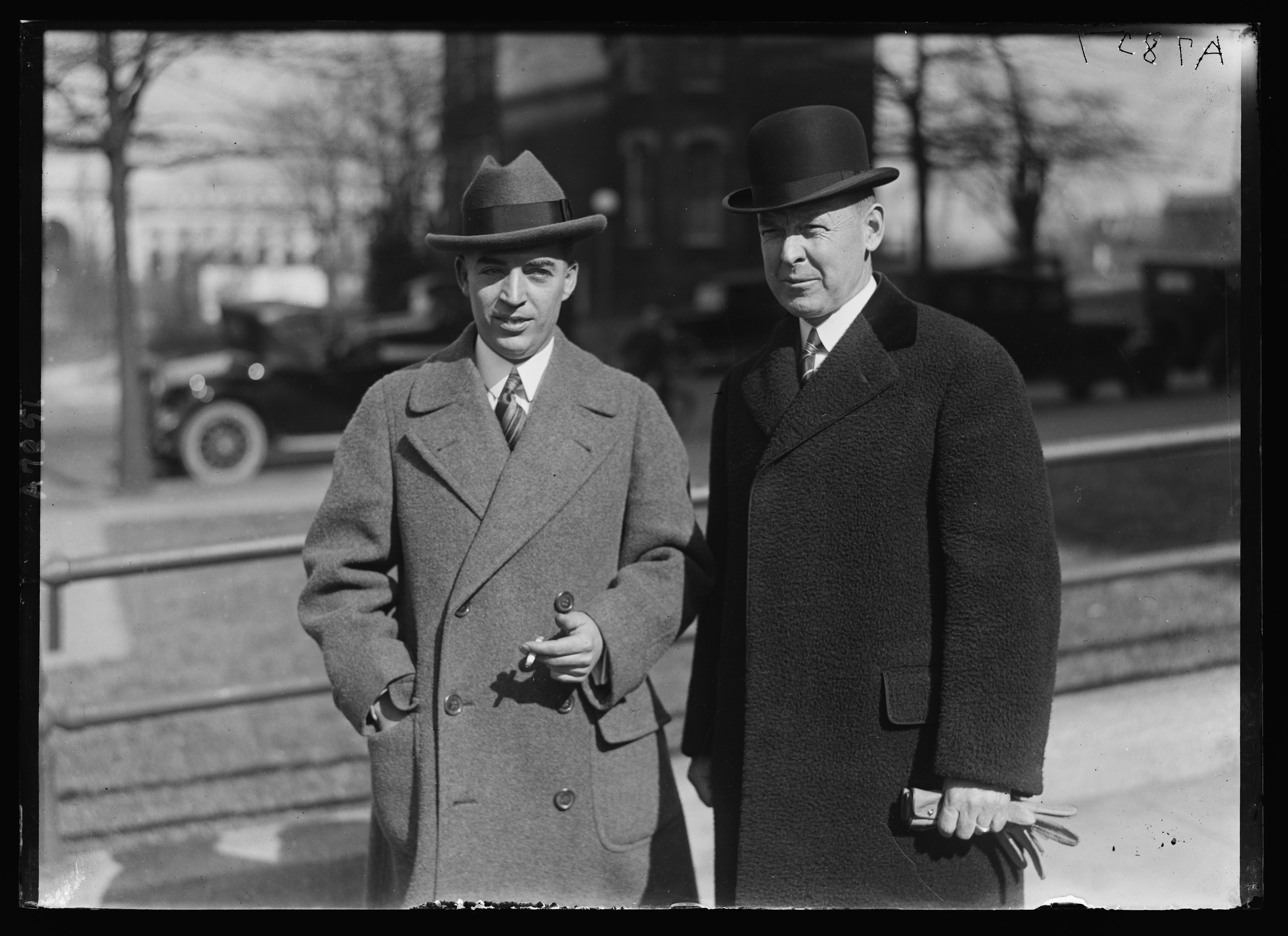
Moore (left) and Brush (right)

Roy Donald Moore was born in 1888 in McArthur, Ohio and grew up on a farm. When he was fourteen he learned Morse code and worked a stint as a telegraph operator. In 1908 he was employed as an operator by the Cleveland News. Thereafter he found work for the Associated Press in Cleveland, Ohio. He was employed as a salesman for the International News Service in New York City, where he met Brush. He owned the Portland Press for a few months in 1921 until its merger with the Portland Herald.

== History ==
In June of 1923, Brush entered into a partnership with Moore to purchase The Marion Star from then-U.S. President Warren G. Harding for $480,000. Around the same time Brush and Moore bought the Marion Tribune from L. S. Galvin and W. J. Galvin. Harding intended to continue writing editorials for The Marion Star but died unexpectedly in August of 1923.

In 1924, Time noted that The Marion Star, the East Liverpool Tribune, the Salem News and the East Liverpool Review comprised one of the prominent newspaper groups in the country, with a total circulation of 30,906. In 1927, Brush and Moore, with William Henry Vodrey, established Brush-Moore Newspapers, Inc. from their holdings.

In 1935, Brush and Moore lost a case in which they requested to deduct a $13,300 yearly salary, which Harding would have received from The Marion Star had he lived to retire from the presidency, from Brush-Moore Newspapers' income tax; it was ruled that the salary would remain taxable.

On June 5, 1941 the Federal Communications Commission began a series of hearings to determine whether Chester A. Thompson, who had acquired 50% of the Portsmouth radio station WPAY, should be permitted to give his stock to Brush-Moore. The FCC examiner P. W. Steward argued that because Thompson was not involved in WPAY’s operations nor knowledgeable about the workings of a radio station, he had no right to. The attorney for the FCC, Marcus Cohn, alleged that Thompson had colluded, against public interests, with Brush-Moore Newspapers to secure Brush-Moore full ownership of WPAY.

Brush and Moore, whose company already owned the other 50% of WPAY, were called up to testify on June 6 and denied any conflict of interest with Thompson; Brush said only that WPAY’s affairs were Moore’s to deal with, and Moore testified that Thompson had managed the station since 1939. The hearings concluded in August of 1941, but the FCC's ruling that the remainder of WPAY would be transferred to Brush-Moore was not made until April of 1944.

Joseph K. Vodrey, son of W. H. Vodrey, became general manager and vice president of Brush-Moore Newspapers in 1946. In the same year Brush stepped down from president of the company to chairman of the board of directors; Moore succeeded Brush as president.

On June 24, 1948, Brush died at the hospital after having a cerebral hemorrhage in his friend Henry A. Hurst's apartment after falling ill at the Republican National Convention in Philadelphia, Pennsylvania; he was 76 years old.

Moore, who served as president, executive committee leader and publisher of Brush-Moore Newspapers, lived out his later years in a house near Congress Lake in Ohio. He died there of cardiovascular disease on May 1, 1954 at the age of 66.

The vacancies left by Moore's death were filled by May 25, 1954. G. Gordon Strong, who had been general manager since 1952, was made president of Brush-Moore; John D. Raridon, who had been executive editor since 1927, was made publisher; and William T. Moore, Roy's son, was made head of the executive committee.

W. H. Vodrey, who served as secretary and treasurer of Brush-Moore Newspapers, died aged 81 on December 19, 1954, only seven months after Moore died. His other son, William H. Vodrey, Jr., assumed the newly vacated positions in January of 1955.

In 1967 Brush-Moore Newspapers was sold by Strong to Thomson Newspapers for 72 million dollars, which was at the time the most a newspaper organization had ever been purchased for. Brush-Moore had by that point owned 12 daily papers, including six in Ohio (the Canton Repository, East Liverpool Review, Salem News, Steubenville Herald, Marion Star, and Portsmouth Times) three in California (Times-Standard, San Gabriel Valley Tribune, and Oxnard Press-Courier), and one in Maryland (Salisbury Daily Times), Pennsylvania (Hanover Evening Sun), and West Virginia (Weirton Daily Times), with a total circulation of approximately 540,000.

== Holdings ==
=== Ohio ===
- Salem News. Owned by Brush since 1897. Sold to Thomson in 1967.
- East Liverpool Review. Acquired by Brush in 1901. Sold to Thomson in 1967.
- The Marion Star. Acquired in 1923 from President Warren G. Harding. Sold to Thomson in 1967.
- Steubenville Herald Acquired 1925. Sold to Thomson in 1967.
- Canton Repository. Acquired 1927. Sold to Thomson in 1967.
- Portsmouth Times. Acquired 1930. Sold to Thomson in 1967.
- Canton Daily News. Acquired and shut down this 97-year-old paper in 1930, leaving Brush-Moore with the only evening paper in the town.
- Ironton Tribune. Acquired 50% interest in 1930, and full ownership in 1955. Sold to Southern Newspapers, Inc. in 1960.

=== California ===
- San Gabriel Valley Tribune. Acquired 1960. Sold to Thomson in 1967.
- Oxnard Press-Courier. Acquired 1963. Sold to Thomson in 1967.
- Times-Standard (Eureka). Acquired in 1967, and sold to Thomson the same year.

=== Other ===
- Salisbury Daily Times (Maryland). Acquired 1937. Sold to Thomson in 1967.
- Hanover Evening Sun (Pennsylvania). Acquired 1958. Sold to Thomson in 1967.
- Weirton Daily Times. Acquired 1962. Sold to Thomson in 1967.
- In 1964, Brush-Moore attempted to purchase the Arizona Daily Star.

=== Radio ===
Ohio Broadcasting Co. was a subsidiary of Brush-Moore which focused on radio interests.

- WHBC (AM) (Canton, Ohio). Purchased 1936.
- WPAY (AM) (Portsmouth, Ohio), acquired in 1944 through purchase of Scioto Broadcasting company.
- WONE (AM) (Dayton, Ohio). Purchased in 1961, sold in 1964 to Group One Broadcasting.
- WONE-FM (now WTUE) (Dayton, Ohio). Purchased in 1961, sold in 1964 to Group One Broadcasting.
- WONE-TV (now WKEF). Dayton television station, purchased in 1961, sold in 1963 to Springfield Television.
- WPDQ (Jacksonville, Florida). Sold in 1964 to Belk Broadcasting Co.

== Works cited ==
- Galbreath, Charles Burleigh (1925). History of Ohio. American Historical Society, Incorporated.
- Broadcasting Publications, Inc. (April 24, 1944). Broadcasting and Broadcast Advertising 1944-04-24: Vol 26 Iss 17. New Bay Media LLC.
- Edward Petry and Co., Inc. (December 16, 1963). "BROADCASTING, December 16, 1963" (PDF). Broadcasting – via American Radio History.
