= Leon Gordon (painter) =

American painter

Leon Gordon (1889–1943) was an American landscape and portrait painter, illustrator, and sculptor. He lived and worked in California, New York (state), Florida, and the Russian Federation.

== Life ==
Gordon was born in 1889 in Borisov, modern day Belarus (then part of the Russian Empire). He later moved to the United States where he studied at the Art Institute of Chicago.

== Career ==
During his life, he painted portraits of Willa Cather, Dorothy Gish, Will Rogers, President Calvin Coolidge, Benjamin Barr Lindsey, Winston Churchill, John L. Lewis and Helen Keller. His work was sold by Earl Stendahl.

While he lived in New York, Gordon was a member of the Society of Independent Artists, and took part in their 1917 exhibition.

In 1930, Good Housekeeping magazine commissioned Gordon to paint twelve portraits of "the twelve greatest American women" (including Eleanor Roosevelt, Grace Abbott and Florence Sabin) which were published once a month in the magazine through 1931.

== Permanent collections ==
Gordon's portrait of Eleanor Roosevelt is included in the National Portrait Gallery in Washington, D.C. His portrait of President Manuel L. Quezon of the Philippines is held in the permanent collection of the Presidential Museum and Library at Malacañang Palace in Manila.

== Death ==
Gordon died of a heart attack on December 31, 1943, in Tallahassee, Florida, where he had been painting the portrait of the parents of then US senator Claude Pepper.
