= Elizabeth Milbank Anderson =

Philanthropist, health advocate (1850–1921)

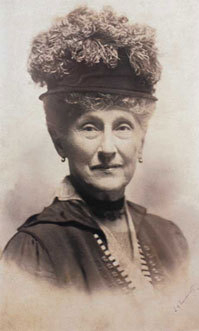
Elizabeth Milbank Anderson

Elizabeth Milbank Anderson (December 20, 1850 – February 22, 1921), American philanthropist and advocate for public health and women's education, was the daughter of Jeremiah Milbank (1818–1884), a successful commission merchant, manufacturer and investor, and Elizabeth Lake (1827–1891). Anderson established in 1905 one of the first foundations funded by a woman, the Memorial Fund Association (renamed the Milbank Memorial Fund in 1921), with gifts of $9.3 million by the time of her death. Anderson in her lifetime supported a wide range of health and social reform efforts during the Progressive Era, from tuberculosis and diphtheria eradication to relief work for European children following World War I, for which she was made in 1919 a Chevalier of the Legion of Honor by the French government.

== Advocacy for public health ==
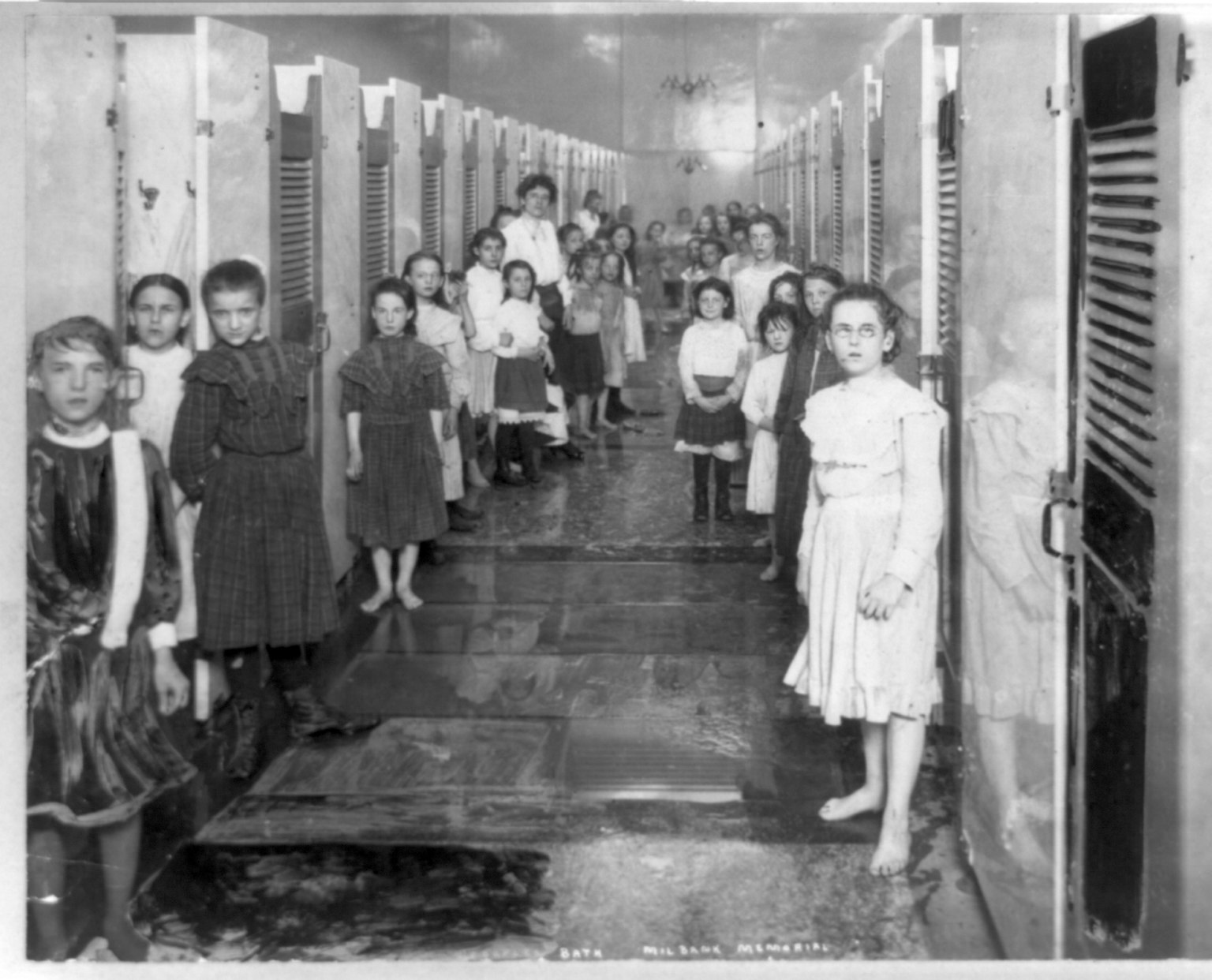
Girls at the model public bath, 1908

Anderson's recorded public health benefactions began with her initial gift in 1891 to Dr. Edward Livingston Trudeau's sanatorium for the tubercular at Saranac Lake, New York, where from 1893 until her death she underwrote the operating costs of his laboratory for the investigation of the treatment of tuberculosis. Anderson's later gifts to improve public health included provision in New York City of a model public bath (1904); the establishment through the Children's Aid Society of the Chappaqua, New York Home for Convalescent Children (1909); the operating funds, with Mrs. William K. Vanderbilt, for the Home Hospital for the Tubercular (1912); and in 1913 the establishment of the Department of Social Welfare at the Association for Improving the Condition of the Poor (a predecessor of today's Community Service Society of New York). The latter department funded public school lunches in New York City for 25,000 school children, provided funding for increased school-based medical inspections, and supported installation of school drinking water fountains and improved ventilation. It also provided public "comfort stations" (bathrooms), public laundries, and in a tenement section of the city, a Food Supply Store which sold good quality food at cost. The department also performed the groundwork which led to the establishment and funding of community health centers, including the Mulberry Street, Columbus Hill and Judson Health Centers, all in New York City (1918–1921). In 1916 Anderson gave $100,000 to Lillian Wald's Henry Street Settlement and joined its board of directors, and separately became the lead donor to the city's Department of Public Charities' Children's Home Bureau, which outplaced orphans from institutions to families. From 1914–1920, Anderson was the largest donor to Clifford Beers's National Committee for Mental Hygiene (today's Mental Health America) where she was particularly concerned for the treatment of returning World War I veterans with "shell-shock."

In the political sphere, Anderson used her influence with New York Senator Elihu Root to help push through passage in 1912 of the bill establishing the United States Children's Bureau (folded into the Federal Service Agency in 1946).

== Advocacy for women's and African-American education ==
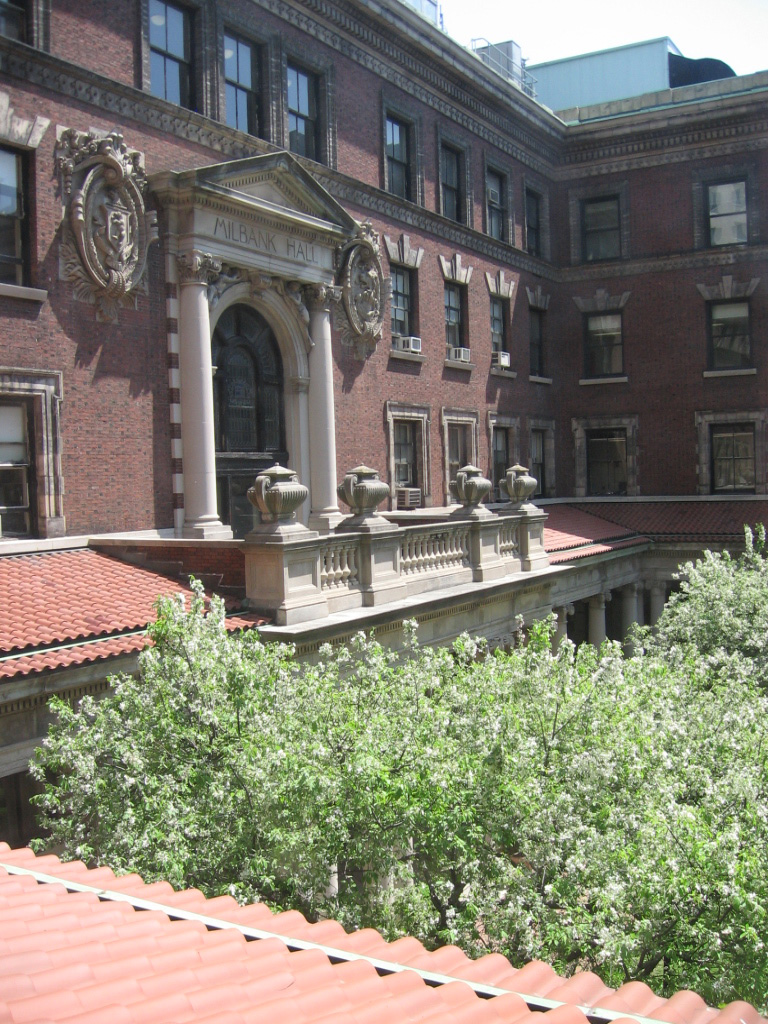
Milbank Hall, on the campus of Barnard College in Morningside Heights (New York City)

In the field of women's and African-American education, Anderson was an initial supporter of Clara B. Spence in creation of the Spence School (New York, 1892), whose first graduating class included Anderson's daughter Eleanor. Anderson also refinanced and rebuilt Greenwich Academy 1914–1917 (Greenwich, CT). In higher education Anderson provided "Milbank Agricultural Hall" to Tuskegee University, Alabama (1909); $50,000 in her will to Fisk University, Nashville, TN (1921) and from 1896 until her death was the largest benefactor of Barnard College, where she served as Vice-Chair of the Board of Trustees from 1899–1921. Separately, in the field of human rights, Anderson provided $100,000 in funding to open in 1905 and support until her death the Harlem office of the Legal Aid Society.

== Early life ==
Anderson was born in New York City on December 20, 1850, and was raised in a conservative Baptist family closely associated with the Madison Avenue Baptist Church (mabcnyc.org). Anderson, like her father, was a devoted church-goer who abstained from consumption of alcohol or participation in the conspicuous social events of her day. Educated by private tutors, Anderson traveled in Europe and became interested in art, as was her father who collected art of the Barbizon School. On June 15, 1876 she married Abraham Archibald Anderson (1846–1940), a portrait artist who was the son of Dutch Reformed Church Reverend William Anderson (1814–1887) and Sarah Louise Ryerson (1818–1907), a descendant of Marten Reyerszen, Brooklyn magistrate in 1679 and of Joris Rapalje, who came from Amsterdam in 1624.

Anderson's father, Jeremiah Milbank, was a successful wholesale grocer, speculator in Texas territorial bonds, manufacturer and railroad investor. His most successful business efforts were the New York Condensed Milk Company (1857, renamed the Borden Company in 1899) and the Chicago, Milwaukee and St. Paul Railway (1876) where he was a member of the executive committee of the Board of Directors. Milbank was a trustee of the baptist Rochester Theological Seminary (University of Rochester) and owned a box at the Metropolitan Opera. The city of Milbank, South Dakota (1880) was named in his honor. At the time of his death in 1884, his fortune was estimated at $32 million, one-half of which he left to his son Joseph and the remainder to Mrs. Anderson and her daughter, Eleanor Milbank Anderson (1878–1959).

== Other activities ==
In 1918, with the financial support of Anderson and partners Klaw & Erlanger, Henry Miller (actor) (1859–1926) created a Broadway theatre on a lot Anderson owned at 124 West 43rd Street, New York City. "Henry Miller's Theatre", between Broadway and 6th Avenue in midtown-Manhattan, was designed in the neo-classical style by architects Paul R. Allen and Ingalls & Hoffman and was named for actor-producer Henry Miller. The original theatre had 950 seats. It opened on April 1, 1918 with the play The Fountain of Youth. It was the first air-conditioned theater in Manhattan, and reflected Anderson's special interest in mechanical ventilation.

The theatre had its first major hit with Noël Coward's The Vortex in 1926. Following Miller's death that same year, the theatre was managed by Gilbert Miller, his son, who bought out the Klaw & Erlanger interest and paid 25% of the gross take of each play he produced to the Milbank Memorial Fund, Anderson's legatee. From the 1930s through the late-1960s, the theater enjoyed significant success, with performances by Helen Hayes, Leslie Howard, Lillian Gish, Douglas Fairbanks, and Ruth Chatterton. The theater is now operated by the Roundabout Theatre under the name Stephen Sondheim Theatre.

Anderson lived in California for part of each year beginning in 1906 at 350 South Grand Ave. in Pasadena, then in Los Angeles in 1907 when she built a home at 671 Wilshire Place. Her vacation residence (1912) at 2300 East Ocean Beach Boulevard is now the Long Beach Museum of Art.

Anderson died in New York City of pernicious anemia on February 22, 1921, and was interred in the Milbank Mausoleum, Putnam Cemetery, Greenwich, CT. She was survived by her husband, Colonel Anderson; her daughter, Dr. Eleanor A. Campbell (Eleanor Milbank Anderson Tanner Campbell, M.D.; 1878–1959); and a granddaughter, Elizabeth Milbank Anderson, II (née Elizabeth Milbank Tanner; 1905–1930). Her primary philanthropic legacy in public health is the work carried on today by the Milbank Memorial Fund.

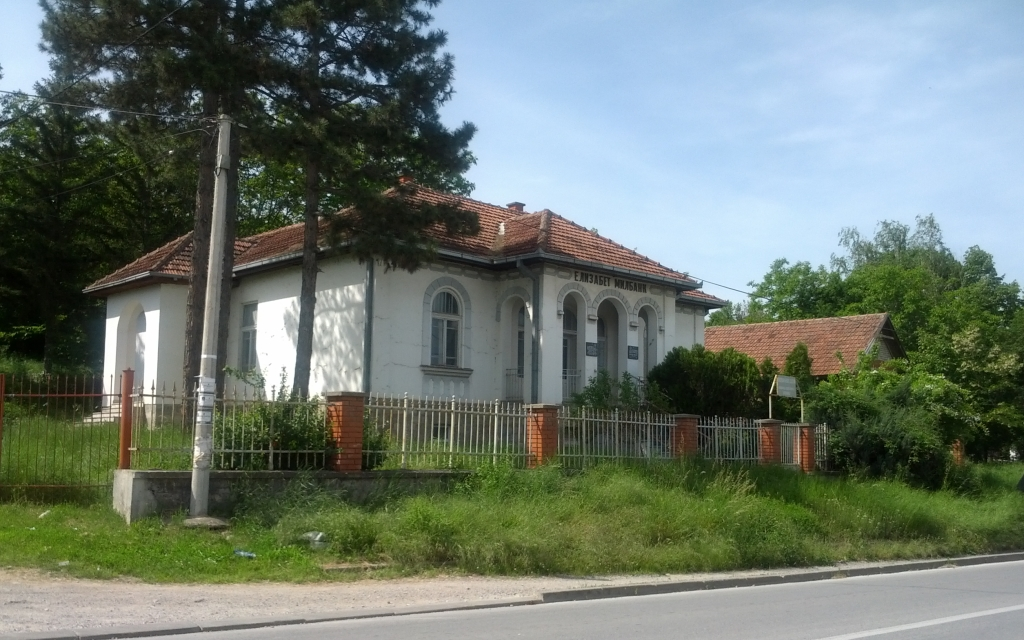
The building with Elizabeth Milbank name written in Cyrillic, located in Slovac, Serbia.

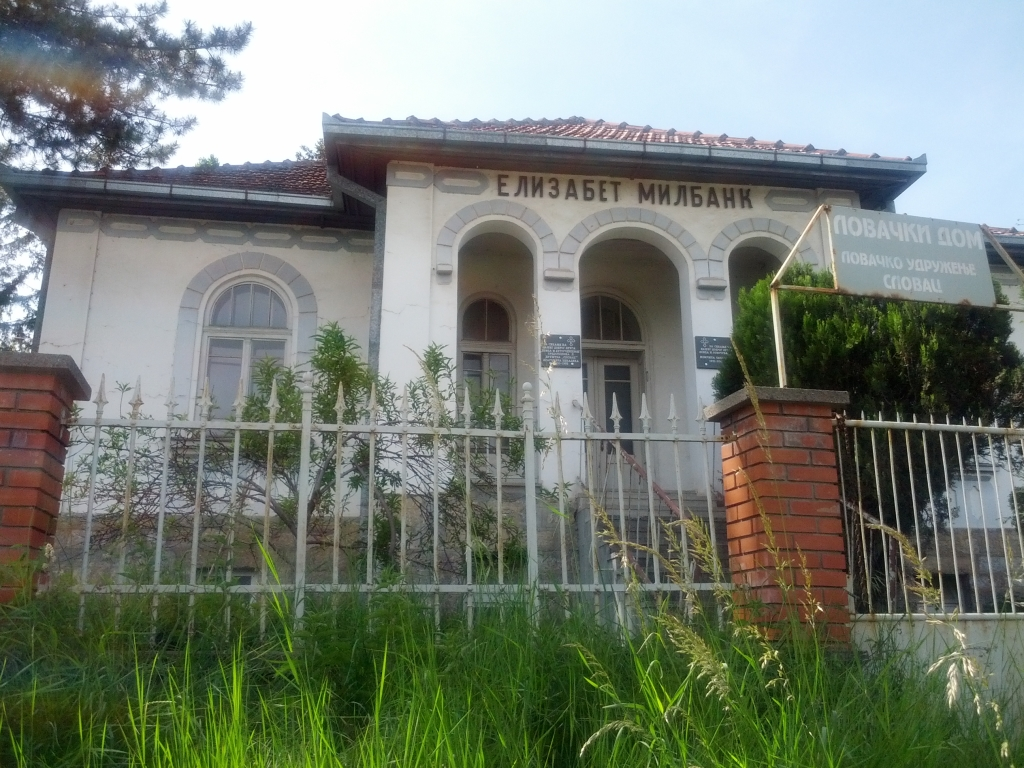
On the board: Hunting Lodge, Slovac.
