= Eleanor Campbell (physician) =

American physician (1878–1959)

Eleanor Anderson Campbell
- Born: Eleanor Milbank Anderson; 1878
- Died: December 29, 1959 (aged 80–81)
- Education: Boston University School of Medicine (1916)
- Occupation: Health center director
- Known for: Founded Judson Health Center
- Relatives: mother: Elizabeth Milbank Anderson: father: Abraham Archibald Anderson
- Medical career
- Profession: Physician
- Awards: Star of Italian Solidarity 1957

Eleanor Anderson Campbell (1878–1959, née Eleanor Milbank Anderson) was the founder and director of the Judson Health Center (1921), a health and dental clinic serving 45,000 residents of the lower west side of New York City. First located in the basement of the Judson Memorial Church south of Washington Square, by 1924 the center was the largest clinic of its kind in the United States. The Center provided healthcare through over one million visits to the largely Italian immigrant population between 1921 and 1957, when Campbell retired. Campbell refused any wages for her services. In 1957, Dr. Campbell was awarded the Star of Italian Solidarity by the Italian government for her contributions to Italian-Americans.

== Early life ==
Campbell was the daughter of philanthropist Elizabeth Milbank Anderson (1850–1921) and artist Abraham Archibald Anderson (1846–1940), and the granddaughter of business magnate Jeremiah Milbank (1818–1884). She graduated with the first class of the Spence School in 1896, attended Bryn Mawr College (1896–1898) and graduated cum laude from the Boston University School of Medicine in 1916.

== Career ==
Campbell began her career in New York City at Metropolitan Hospital and later worked at the Mulberry Street Health Center, operated by the New York Association for Improving the Condition of the Poor and partially funded by the Milbank Memorial Fund, founded by Campbell's mother. Responding to entreaties from Reverend Alonzo Ray Petty to attend to the needs of the many local children suffering from rickets, Campbell opened the center at the Judson Church in January, 1921. Later out-growing its quarters, the Center moved first to 237 Thompson Street and later to 34 Spring Street. Campbell was married to John Stewart Tanner, M.D. in 1904 (divorced 1910) and secondly to Frederick Barber Campbell, Esq., in 1918 (divorced 1924).

Dr. Campbell spent part of each summer after 1922 in Deering, New Hampshire, where she provided free medical care to the local and surrounding communities through the Deering Health Center, which she founded for that purpose. In 1931, she founded the Deering Foundation (renamed the Eleanor A. Campbell Charitable Fund in 2016) to provide tuition support for local residents. The foundation still operates, with assets of over $1 million in 2022.

Campbell died December 29, 1959, and was predeceased by her daughter, born Elizabeth Milbank Tanner (1905–1930). Campbell was interred in the Milbank Mausoleum, Putnam Cemetery, Greenwich, Connecticut.
