= Community health centers in the United States =

Health care model providing care to low-income, underserved communities

The community health center (CHC) in the United States is the dominant model for providing integrated primary care and public health services for the low-income and uninsured, and represents one use of federal grant funding as part of the safety net in the country's health care system. The health care safety net can be defined as a group of health centers, hospitals, and providers willing to provide services to the nation's uninsured and underserved population, thus ensuring that comprehensive care is available to all, regardless of income or insurance status. According to the U.S. Census Bureau, 29 million people in the country (9.1% of the population) were uninsured in 2015. Many more Americans lack adequate coverage or access to health care. These groups are sometimes called "underinsured". CHCs represent one method of accessing or receiving health and medical care for both underinsured and uninsured communities.

CHCs are organized as non-profit, clinical care providers that operate under comprehensive federal standards. The two types of clinics that meet CHC requirements are those that receive federal funding under Section 330 of the Public Health Service Act and those that meet all requirements applicable to federally funded health centers and are supported through state and local grants. Both types of CHCs are designated as "Federally Qualified Health Centers" (FQHCs), which grants them special payment rates under Medicare, Medicaid, and the Children's Health Insurance Program (CHIP). To receive Section 330 grant funds, CHCs must meet the following qualifications:

- Be located in a federally designated medically under-served area or serve medically under-served populations
- Provide comprehensive primary care
- Address many aspects of the patient health through different services (dental, mental health, substance abuses along with other social services)
- Adjust charges for health services on a sliding fee schedule according to patient income and provide the services to all of the patients regardless of their socioeconomic background and their ability to pay.
- Be governed by a community board of which a majority of members are patients at the CHC

CHCs place great value in being patient-centered. Uniquely in community health centers, at least 51% of all governing board members must be patients of the clinic. This policy creates interesting implications in terms of how "participatory" CHCs are, as governing board members become directly invested in the quality of the clinic. A sliding fee scale based on income is implemented so that the cost of care is proportionate to the patient's ability to pay. The purpose of these stipulations is to ensure that CHCs are working alongside the community, instead of just serving the community, in order to improve access to care.

Community health centers that receive federal funding through the Health Resources and Services Administration, an agency of the U.S. Department of Health and Human Services, are also called "Federally Qualified Health Centers". There are now more than 1,250 federally supported FQHCs with more than 8,000 service delivery sites. They are community health centers, migrant health centers, health care for the homeless centers, and public housing primary care centers that deliver primary and preventive health care to more than 20 million people in all 50 states, the District of Columbia, Puerto Rico, the Virgin Islands, and the Pacific Basin.

== History ==
According to historian John Duffy, the concept of community health centers in the United States can be traced to infant milk stations in New York City in 1901. In November, 1914, the city established the first district health center in New York at 206 Madison Avenue, serving 35,000 residents of Manhattan's lower east side. The staff consisted of one medical inspector and three nurses stationed permanently in the district who, through a house card system, developed a complete health record of each family. In 1915, the system expanded, adding four district centers in Queens. Wartime and political pressures ended this development in New York City, but privately funded clinics through the New York Association for Improving the Condition of the Poor were started in 1916 (Bowling Green Neighborhood Association), 1917 (Columbus Hill Health Center), 1918 (Mulberry Street Health Center) and 1921 (Judson Health Center). Founded by Eleanor A. Campbell in Greenwich Village, the Judson Health Center became the largest health center in the U.S. by 1924.

The official establishment of community health centers was caused by the civil rights movement of the 1960s. The Office of Economic Opportunity (OEO) established what was initially called "neighborhood health centers" as a War on Poverty demonstration program. The aim of these clinics was to provide access points to health and social services to medically under-served and disenfranchised populations. The health centers were intended to serve as a mechanism for community empowerment. Accordingly, federal funds for the clinics went directly to nonprofit, community-level organizations. The health centers were designed and run with extensive community involvement to ensure that they remained responsive to community needs.

Under the modern definition, the first community health center in the United States was the Columbia Point Health Center in Dorchester, Massachusetts, which opened in December 1965. The center was founded by two medical doctors - H. Jack Geiger, who had been on the faculty of Harvard University and later at Tufts University, and Count Gibson, also from Tufts University. Geiger had previously studied the first community health centers and the principles of community-oriented primary care with Sidney Kark and colleagues while serving as a medical student in rural Natal, South Africa. The federal government's Office of Economic Opportunity (OEO) funded the Columbia Point Health Center, which served the poor community living in the Columbia Point Public Housing Projects located on an isolated peninsula far away from Boston City Hospital. On its twenty-fifth anniversary in 1990, the center was rededicated as the Geiger-Gibson Community Health Center and is still in operation.

In 1967, Geiger and Gibson also established a rural community health center, the Tufts-Delta Health Center (now the Delta Health Center), in Mound Bayou, Bolivar County, Mississippi to serve the poverty-stricken Bolivar County. This center was also set up in conjunction with Tufts University with a grant from the OEO. While the Columbia Point Health Center was set in an urban community, the Delta Health Center represented a rural model, and included educational, legal, dietary, and environmental programs in addition to the health services carries out at the center and throughout the county by its public health nurses. The war on poverty enlisted many idealistic men, such as Leon Kruger, the first Director of the CHC at Mound Bayou. As a result, many families such as his, were drafted in the war on poverty, often at their own risk.

As the war on poverty expanded, the federal government began to recognize the need for a more organized and sustainable approach to healthcare in underserved areas. With increasing federal involvement and funding from programs like the OEO, the model of community health centers began to take shape, providing critical care to low-income populations. In the early 1970s, the health centers program was transferred to the Department of Health, Education, and Welfare (HEW). The HEW has since become the U.S. Department of Health and Human Services (HHS). Within HHS, the Health Resources and Services Administration (HRSA), Bureau of Primary Health Care (BPHC) currently administers the program. However, despite the federal backing, funding cuts in the 1970s and 1980s, low reimbursement rates, and political opposition hindered the expansion of CHCs.

By the early 2000s, community health centers (CHCs) were supported by policies from the Centers for Medicare and Medicaid Services, HRSA and the Affordable Care Act. These shifts highlighted the ongoing struggle of community health centers to provide comprehensive care despite funding challenges. In response, community health centers began relying more heavily on Medicaid payments and federal grants set up by Section 330 of the Public Health Service Act. In 2010, the Community Health Center Fund was created by Congress to aid in the expansion of community health centers. Since the 2013 fiscal year, discretionary funding from Congress has flatlined at approximately $1.5 billion but increased to $1.6 billion in 2018 via the Consolidated Appropriations Act of 2018. Funding has increased for CHCs, allowing them to increase their reach, staffing, and the services they can provide. Between 2010 and 2017, the number of operating sites increased by over 4,000, and shares of centers providing mental health services increased by 22%.

Since the Affordable Care Act's expansion of Medicaid, community health centers—and the health care safety net as a whole—have sought to attract newly insured patients facing increased care options in order to remain financially viable.

The evolution of the terminology used to describe what are now called "community health centers" is crucial to understanding their history and how they are contextualized in the United States social safety net. To qualify as FQHC, CHCs receive cost-related reimbursement rates from Medicare or Medicaid, operate as a non-profit, and require a patient-majority community board. CHCs retain their historical commitment to responding to community needs, through mechanisms such as requiring at least 51% of governing board members to be patients at the health center.

== Patient demographics ==
Community health centers primarily provide health care to patients who are uninsured or covered by Medicaid. In 2007, almost 40% of all CHC patients lacked insurance, and 35% were Medicaid patients. In 2008, 1,080 CHCs provided comprehensive primary care to more than 17.1 million people. CHC patients typically have low family incomes, live in medically under-served communities, and have complicated health conditions. 70% of CHC patients in 2007 had family incomes of no more than 100% of the federal poverty level; more than 90% of patients had family incomes at or below twice the poverty level. Health center patients are also ethnically diverse. In 2007, half of all CHC patients were minorities, a third of which were Hispanic. All together, CHCs serve one in four low-income, minority residents. CHC patients are more likely to reside in rural areas relative to the rest of the population. They tend to be younger in age and are more likely to be female. In 2008, 36% of all CHC patients were children, and almost three in five patients were female.

Many CHC patients suffer from chronic conditions such as diabetes, asthma, hypertension, or substance abuse. CHC patients are more likely to report these chronic conditions than adults from the national population. Characteristics linked to serious health problems, such as smoking and obesity rates, are also significantly higher in adult CHC patients compared to the general population. High rates of mental health conditions, including depression and anxiety, also contribute to the overall high rates of chronic illness in CHCs. Nonetheless, as of 2016, 91% of CHCs report having met at least one or more of Healthy People 2020 goals.

== Immigrants and community health centers ==
Immigrants are some of the primary patients that community health centers serve due to the cultural and societal barriers the group experiences. From the 1970s up to the early 2000s, the effect on immigrant families has increased relative to families native to the U.S. due to factors such as parental education, parental employment, and racial/ethnic composition. However, immigrant families generally have a lower access to mental healthcare, leaving them at a greater risk to not treat their mental health issues. Part of this problem lays in the foundations of immigrant communities, as many non-Western cultures perceive a strong stigma towards mental health topics and lack a proper system of social support to address these issues. Even more common is the lack of understanding or awareness that these mental health help resources exist. Due to complexities in how insurance and healthcare works, which is compounded by language barriers, many immigrant families are unable to properly educate themselves on what services exist and how they may utilize these services. For those who are able to understand, lack of outreach may lead them to assume that they are ineligible, when, in fact, they are eligible to receive such services. The effects of this lack of understanding especially harms immigrant children, who rely on their parents' knowledge of mental healthcare, who may inadvertently deny their children of needed mental health services.

One proposed solution to this problem is through community health centers (CHC), which are able to provide a unique service experience for the population it serves. For many of these CHCs, they must adapt to the geographical space it inhabits, in addition to cultural and linguistic variations in the surrounding demographics. As a result, they are equipped to address social stigmas present in their communities, an obstacle that hinders the use of available mental health resources. Additionally, CHCs also have the capability of overcoming local institutional barriers that may make it difficult or uncomfortable for immigrant groups to seek out healthcare. By providing translator services or linguistically appropriate health materials, for example, members of the local community are more empowered to educate themselves on mental health issues and solutions, as the information is provided in a form that is easily understood.

Due to successes in some CHCs in impacting their communities, policies like the early 2000s Medicaid reform and the Bush administration's health center initiative allowed for expansion of behavioral healthcare services in CHCs. Previously, there were large restrictions on reimbursement for these services, causing them to be very costly. However, the advent of such policies show a movement that trends towards further increases in healthcare accessibility. Policies like the Affordable Care Act (ACA) and Chapter 58 have incrementally increased accessibility to healthcare, simultaneously setting a precedent for even further expansion.

=== Community health centers in California ===
==== Asian Health Services ====
One example of a community health center that serves immigrants is Asian Health Services in Oakland, CA. Asian Health Services aims to provide health, social, and advocacy services for the immigrant and refugee Asian community by entailing many of the strategies previously discussed. Additionally, they provide primary care services, including mental health, case management, nutrition, and dental care in English and 14 languages: Korean, ASL, Lao, Burmese, Mandarin, Cantonese, French, Mien, Karen, Mongolian, Karenni, Tagalog, Khmer, and Vietnamese. Their youth program provides services including health education, cultural awareness, job training, and college readiness to East Bay Asian American youth.

===== Youth Program =====
In addition to their main clinic they also have a youth program that attempts to address the stigma about mental and sexual health in Asian culture by recruiting local Asian American youth to get involved with advocacy and create educational resources/workshops surrounding these topics. Many Asian Americans, though a very diverse group, have historically felt discouraged from seeking help for mental health concerns due to stigma and pressure to focus on academic and professional success. Additionally, the “model minority” myth plays a role in Asian Americans not seeking support for mental health.

Asian Health Services Youth Program attempts to address these concerns using methods that Asian American immigrant youth claim would help. In a study on school-based mental health for Asian American immigrant youth, students suggested engaging students and parents, using peers to share their experiences to reduce stigma, and providing educational videos and materials. The program also provides educational material through its social media outlets and workshops.

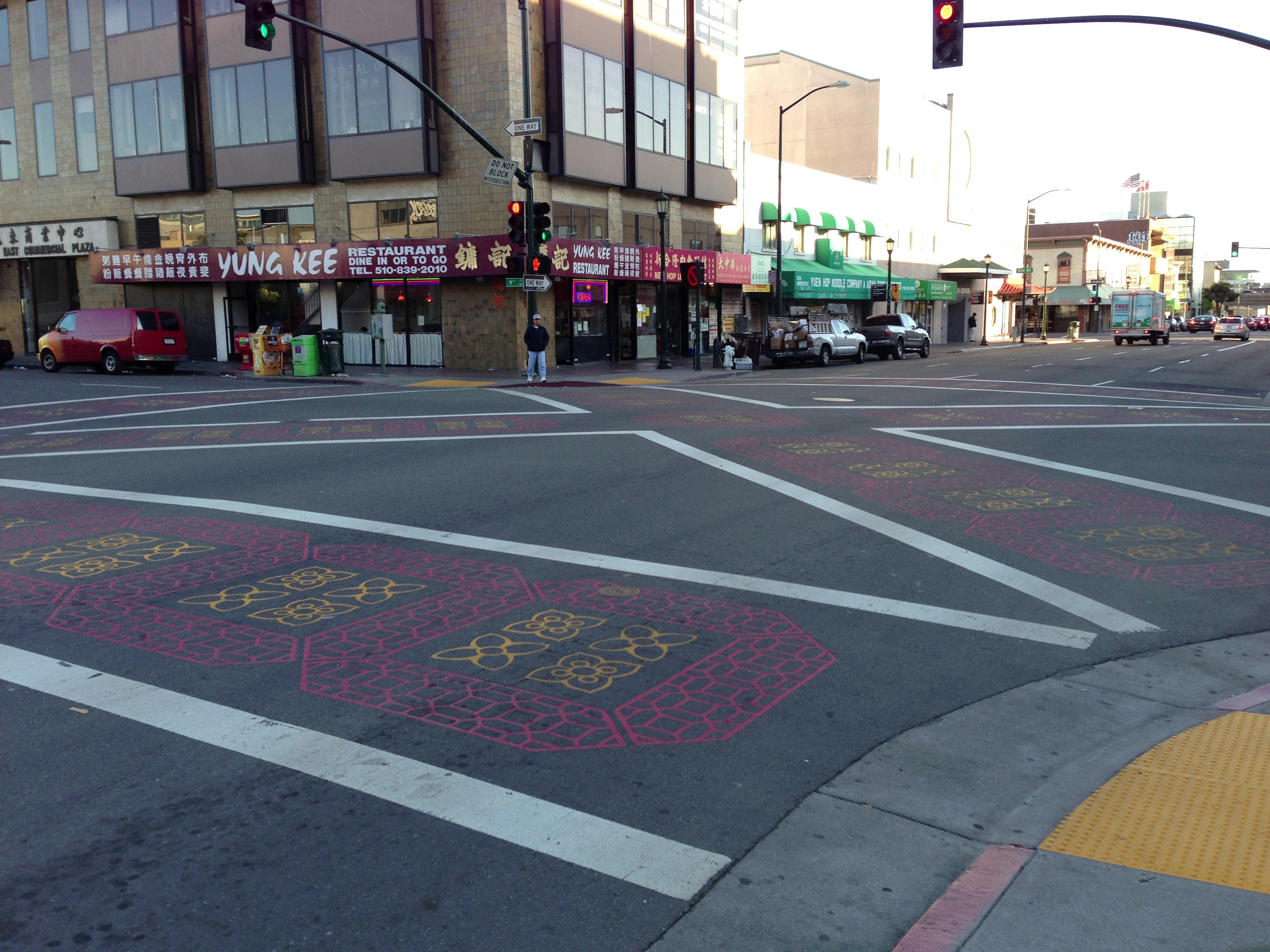
Revive Chinatown! Crosswalk improvements

===== Project: Revive Chinatown! =====
In the early 2000s, Asian Health Services envisioned a project called Revive Chinatown! that would create a safer pedestrian environment, while also transforming Oakland, California Chinatown's commercial district into a regional shopping destination. The key to securing the funding and support for this project was in re-defining the issue from one of public health into one of environmental justice. In doing so, Asian Health Services hoped to address the issue of pedestrian safety by simultaneously working on a long-term solution for increased quality of life. The Revive Chinatown! movement has gained traction and is cited as a success story of a CHC being able to successfully create a more public health-friendly environment, which bolsters their case and contributes to the trend towards further healthcare accessibility by means of CHCs.

== Services ==
Integration of health care services is a major emphasis of community health centers, in addition to the provision of preventive and comprehensive care. Services provided can vary depending upon the site, but frequently include primary care, dental care, counseling services, women's health services, podiatry, mental and behavioral health services, substance abuse services, and physiotherapy. Often, CHCs are the only local source of dental, mental health, and substance abuse care available to low-income patients.

Most recently, CHCs have played an increasing role in the opioid epidemic by facilitating access to treatment. CHCs have experienced an increase in the number of patients with opioid use disorder (OUD) from 2015 to 2018. As part of the substance use disorders (SUD) component of services provided by CHCs, services have been added and expanded relating to the prevention and treatment of opioid use disorder. The number of CHCs that provide services for SUD has increased from 20% in 2010, to 28% in 2018. There has been a 36% increase in the number of full-time staff at CHCs who are trained to provide SUD services. As of the federal budget for the 2019 fiscal year, over $5 billion has been requested for the Department of Health and Human Services to use over the upcoming five years towards addressing the opioid epidemic. Of that request, $350 million has already been available for grants to be awarded by the start of the 2019 fiscal year.

Because patients can come from a diverse range of socioeconomic, educational, cultural, and linguistic backgrounds, CHCs offer additional public health services unrelated to direct care, such as health promotion and education, advocacy and intervention, translation and interpretation, and case management. CHCs emphasize empowerment, so they also have programs to help eligible patients apply to federally funded health coverage programs, such as Medicaid.

By assisting eligible patients with applications to federally funded health coverage like Medicaid, CHCs lay the groundwork for expanding access to critical health services. This foundation is particularly important for cancer-focused navigation programs, which rely on Medicaid and similar resources to help patients overcome financial barriers to care. Through these programs, CHCs not only facilitate access to cancer treatment but also provide essential support in navigating complex healthcare systems, ensuring that underserved patients receive comprehensive and timely care. For instance, some of these programs have shown increased adherence to follow-up appointments, and attendance at cancer peer support groups. Additionally, these programs are effective in improving communication between patient and provider, decision making, and treatment completion, and emotional well-being. However, low engagement of navigators with patients who have multiple chronic conditions lack information, record, and access to care because of finances or distance. These challenges are compounded by structural barriers like insufficient funding, low reimbursement rates for navigators and lack of integration within broader healthcare policies. These systematic issues limit the scalability and sustainability of patient navigation programs. Addressing these ongoing challenges requires a commitment to equitable resource distribution, improved technology integration, and policy reforms that prioritize underserved populations.

CHCs prioritize a community-centered approach to address challenges such as low engagement, limited resources and structural barriers. To meet this goal, administrative and health care personnel meet regularly to focus on the health care needs of the particular community that they are trying to serve. Individual CHCs will often provide specialized programs tailored to the populations they serve. These populations could include specific minority groups, the elderly, or the homeless. To determine what the community's needs may be, CHC staff may decide to engage in community-based participatory research. The success of community health centers depends on collaborative relationships with community members, industry, government, hospitals and other health care services and providers.

=== Role of community clinics in Medicaid expansion ===
Community Health Centers strongly align with the objectives of the Affordable Care Act (ACA). The ACA aims to establish a healthcare system that prioritizes patients, extends healthcare services to low-income individuals, and places a great emphasis on preventive care. The patients who visit health centers are considered to be among the most vulnerable populations in the country who face numerous barriers to accessing traditional forms of medical care, such as where they live, their cultural identity, language barriers, and complex health needs. Consequently, the patients who visit health centers are often from low-income backgrounds, uninsured or publicly insured, and from minority communities.

During the autumn season of 2017, Medicaid accounted for 44% of the revenue generated by Community Health Centers (CHCs) and was regarded as the primary source of primary care for Medicaid patients.

=== Quality of care ===
Quality of care at CHCs can be assessed through many measurements and indices, including the availability of preventative services, treatment and management of chronic diseases, other health outcomes, cost effectiveness, and patient satisfaction. According to several studies, the quality of care at community health centers is comparable to the quality of care provided by private physicians. However, one major challenge that community health centers face is that the population that they serve is usually dealing with many other factors that can also detrimentally affect their health. As CHCs primarily treat the low-income and uninsured, many of their patients do not regularly see a primary care physician, which can lead to poorer health outcomes. Additionally, there is research to indicate that many CHC patients delay seeking health care because they hold a negative view of the health care safety net and expect discrimination from CHCs.

It is crucial for CHCs to evaluate the quality of care they provide in order to meet federal requirements and to fulfill their mission of eliminating health disparities based on socio-economic and insurance status.

Only recently has an evaluation program been instituted for CHCs. Such a program did exist briefly from 2002 to 2004; the Agency for Healthcare Research and Quality (AHRQ) and HRSA jointly monitored CHC providers. As of 2016, the HRSA utilizes the Uniform Data System to gather performance data from all health center grantees (FQHCs) and their look-alikes, which would include CHCs as well. Reporting instructions for the annual UDS report include information on patient demographics, clinical processes and outcomes, services, costs, and more. UDS data has been used to provide a health center adjusted quartile, which ranks the clinical performance of a health center in comparison to other health centers with similar characteristics such as minorities served, etc. In addition, external organizations such as The Center for Health Design, Kaiser Permanente, and the CDC also offer evaluation tools for CHCs.

It is becoming more difficult for Community Health Centers (CHCs) to find and retain enough primary care physicians. Many CHCs are already operating at capacity and are unable to accept new patients. CHCs could gain by expanding their non-physician primary care personnel by establishing community outreach clinics in order to satisfy this need and by doing so, CHCs might effectively serve a lot more Medicaid patients. However, physicians and non-physician health professionals were trained to treat varying complexity levels of diseases and do not share the same scope of practice, therefore, federal governments have to provide more funds to CHCs to hire enough physicians to accommodate an increasing number of patients.

=== Continuity of care ===
Community health center patients are less likely to seek medical care consistently, as many of these patients tend to be from vulnerable populations in terms of socioeconomic background and insurance status. Nevertheless, those who use community health centers as a regular source of care are likely to have a positive patient experience and receive high-quality preventative services.

Medicaid's shift to managed care has helped create more medical homes for patients, allowing for greater continuity of care within CHCs.

=== Preventive services ===
Studies have indicated that CHCs provide preventive services at similar rates to private physicians. Preventative services studied included cancer screenings, diet and exercise counseling, and immunizations. CHCs performing higher than private providers in terms of immunization rates, but lower in terms of diet and exercise counseling.

=== Specialty care ===
Although CHCs are able to provide comprehensive primary care, they are limited in their ability to provide specialty care due to a lack of providers. The people affected most by this scarcity in services are the uninsured and Medicaid patients. In areas with a high uninsurance rate, which tend to be the medically underserved areas where CHCs operate, there is often a lack of availability of specialty care.

=== Chronic disease management ===
Compared with patients who receive care from private providers, CHC patients are almost three times more likely to seek care for serious and chronic conditions. However, with the exception of those with private insurance, CHC patients are also more likely to meet referral obstacles than comparable patients treated by private physicians. In one study investigated management of diabetes in CHCs, a majority of patients exhibited signs or symptoms of diabetes, but relatively few received comprehensive monitoring and management. Moreover, adherence to treatment protocols was low in CHCs, speaking both to the effectiveness of CHCs and to the social determinants of health that make CHC patients so vulnerable.

== Financing ==
Community health centers rely on a combination of Medicaid payments, grant revenues, and other private and public funding sources to fund their operations. The sources of funding for health centers have changed significantly over time. Public Health Service Act grants under Section 330 were once a prominent source of funding for CHCs. Although 330 grants remain important to the financial viability of health centers, federal reimbursement policy under Medicaid has become their largest source of revenue. In 2008, Public Health Service Act grants comprised 18.3% of all CHC revenues. The expansion of CHCs has instead been largely funded by the growth in Medicaid resulting from eligibility expansions, coverage reforms, and modified payment rules. In 1985, Medicaid patients made up 28% of all CHC patients but only 15% of CHC revenues. By 2007, the share of Medicaid patients matched their share of revenues. In the same time period, grants for the uninsured decreased from 51% to 21%. In 2008, Medicaid payments had grown to account for 37% of all CHC revenues.

In 1989, Congress created the Federally Qualified Health Center (FQHC) program, which established a preferential payment policy for health centers by requiring "cost-based" reimbursement for both Medicaid and Medicare. The policy designated FQHC services as a mandatory Medicaid service that all states must cover and reimburse on a cost-related basis, using the Medicaid prospective payment system. The aim of these payment changes was to prevent health centers from using Section 330 and other grants (intended for the uninsured) to subsidize low Medicaid payment rates. The resulting payment structure reimbursed health centers on the basis of their actual costs for providing care, not by a rate negotiated with the state Medicaid agency or set by Medicare.

Medicaid's shift to a managed care delivery system in the 1990s required CHCs to again modify their financial structure. The implementation of managed care in Medicaid was intended to curb costs while providing patients with greater freedom to choose where they access care. However, the shift had adverse financial implications on safety net providers. Health centers largely lost money in their early experiences of contracting and assuming risk for Medicaid managed care patients. Uncertainty about financial viability also lead to concerns about the ability of CHCs to continue serving the uninsured. In 1997, to protect health centers under managed care, Congress mandated that state Medicaid agencies make a "wrap-around" payment to FQHCs to cover the difference between their costs for providing care and the rates they were receiving from managed care organizations (MCOs). Since the initial shift to managed care, Medicaid has helped a wider group of patients access consistent medical care.

The economic recession in the United States continues to pose significant challenges for community health centers. In 2002, President Bush launched the Health Center Expansion Initiative, to significantly increase access to primary health care services in 1,200 communities through new or expanded health center sites. However, these funds furthered disparity between CHCs, as they primarily benefitted larger, financially stable CHCs, rather than expanding and improving care in smaller clinics. In 2008, the Health Care Safety Net Act reauthorized the health centers program for four years with the expectation of expanding the program by 50% over the time period. In 2009, the American Recovery and Reinvestment Act (ARRA) appropriated $2 billion for investment in health center expansion. By 2010, assisted by funding received through the ARRA, health centers had expanded to serve more than 18 million people. The health center program's annual federal funding grew from $1.16 billion in the 2001 fiscal year to $2.6 billion in the 2011 fiscal year. Health centers served 24,295,946 patients in 2015.

After the September 30, 2017 expiration of the Community Health Center Fund (CHCF), 2018 funding finally passed in the House of Representatives and on November 6, 2017, was referred to the Senate Finance Committee as the CHIMES act. The CHCF accounts for approximately 70% of available grant funding for CHCs, and represents approximately 20% of revenue. In anticipation of the delay in funding for the 2018 fiscal year, CHCs froze hirings, laid off staff, reduced hours of operations, and took other actions while facing funding uncertainty. On February 9, 2018, the Bipartisan Budget Act authorized $3.8 billion for 2018, and $4 billion in 2019 for CHC funding. In addition, to address a shortage of family physicians in CHCs, the act also increased funding for HRSA's Teaching Health Centers Graduate Medical Education (THC-GME) programs, which provides residency training in community-based primary care settings, rather than hospitals. Additionally, on August 15, 2018, HRSA announced that it awarded $125 million in grants via its Quality Improvement grant program to 1,352 CHCs.

In 2020, HRSA announced the deposition of around $90 million in American Rescue Plan funding to reduce disparities and advance equity through technology. Biden’s proposed budget supports the expansion of community health center funding and House Lower Costs, More Transparency Act (H.R. 5378) and Senate Bipartisan Primary Care and Health Workforce Act (S. 2840) increased funding at varying levels.

When the COVID-19 pandemic hit, community health centers were at the front lines of a global public health emergency. Between 2020 and 2022, CHCs demonstrated resilience throughout pandemic recovery, radically changing their modes of care. They rapidly assembled curbside and drive-through swab testing, adapted facilities to ensure social distancing and increased integration of telemedicine. Community health centers have no choice but to serve the safety-net populations most at risk, yet as a result, their revenue assets greatly declined with an estimation of $4 billion spent in eight months. They were especially vital at this time, but continued to suffer consequences financially. The Paycheck Protection Program (PPP), HRSA Uninsured Claims Fund, HHS Provider Relief Fund, and alternative COVID-19 grants passed as temporary congressional funding relief ratification. In August 2020, Congress ended with no consensus on a new relief bill, demonstrating the continual push and pull of allocating sustained, long-term funding to community health centers.

In 2021, President Biden launched his “Build Back Better” proposal, which included distributing $7.6 billion to community health centers as a response to COVID-19. In addition, 5.7 billion was given through the Consolidated Appropriations Act of 2021 to expand workforce, infrastructure and testing and vaccination services. On average, community health centers approximated the administration of 150,000 COVID-19 tests and 253,000 vaccines. These federal investments further demonstrated the gaps in care without proper funding, as well as the necessity for community health centers’ capacity, adaptability and quality of medical and social support.

Patient numbers are growing within community health centers nationally, yet they face threats to their financial stability. Community health centers’ financial margins reduced significantly between 2021 and 2023 due to a variety of reasons. The COVID-19 crisis, low Medicaid reimbursement rates and stagnant federal funding have forced community health centers to operate on thin ice. In addition, uncertainties about timing and amount of future federal funding is unpredictable, adding another layer of stress onto physicians' backs. Currently, the Community Health Center Fund provides 70 percent of their federal funding is set to expire at the end of 2024. The projected decline of Medicaid revenue is likely caused by Medicaid eligibility redeterminations, which have decreased the number of people covered by Medicaid. Thus, uninsured rates are increasing, which leads to community health centers providing more uncompensated care than on average.

Despite the stagnant funding, California recently passed Proposition 35, which is an immense victory for patients and can stabilize the Medi-Cal program as a "generational investment". Prop. 35 is set to designate majority of the state's Managed Care Organization Tax (MCO Tax) to raise rates for specific providers (such as doctors and certain specialists, behavioral health facilities, outpatient clinics, hospitals, ambulances and doctors-in-training to increase accessibility to healthcare). This measure will redirect the tax funds of about $2–5 billion annually exclusively into Medi-Cal. Supporters of the proposition argue that tax revenue derives from health care and should be reinvested into the health care system, rather than failing to specify how this levied tax is spent.

== Impact ==
A 2024 study found that the roll-out of community health centers in the US leads to improvements in infant health outcomes. When mothers have access to a community health center, there is a 25- to 42-gram increase in birth weight and a 9% to 16% reduction in the likelihood of low birth weight. The mechanism for this is increased access to early prenatal care and reductions in maternal smoking.

Based on the current studies, an increase in community health clinics is linked to improvement in access to care and better outcomes for underserved communities in the United States. Researchers linked this increase in healthcare centers and access to the expansion of federal support and eligibility requirements, as well as Medicaid Expansion and the passing of the Affordable Care Act. Based on the data from the Health Resources and Services Administration, in 2013, community centers served 31 million patients, which was almost double from the 17 million patients served in 2008.

Data shows that in federally designated Health Professional Shortage Areas (HPSAs), like rural communities, underfunded cities and low income populations, there is a lack in access to care, which includes lack of access to specialties, physicians and outpatient services. Community health centers and their services fill this gap, leading to improvement in accessing primary care in rural and underserved populations and an emphasis on preventative care. The review shows that there were more patients utilizing primary and preventative care, especially in these affected communities. This increased access in screening and early detection is linked to a reduction in emergency department visits for non-urgent conditions, better health outcomes and lower costs for uninsured patients and hospitals.

Based on medical data, this increased access to care and screening is associated with an improvement in chronic disease management, due to the policy of focusing on long-term disease management, which most community health clinics employ. A study done averaging patients amongst healthcare centers, shows that most of their patients have a higher prevalence rate of diabetes, asthma, mental health conditions and tend to be burdened with chronic disease, which means that this form of care can be beneficial to their health. This is shown by data that concludes that the patients that have access to community clinics have better blood pressure control, glucose monitoring and a better handling of asthma attacks, compared to populations without access to community health clinics and primary care.

Due to lower rates of emergency department use and better management of chronic illness, community healthcare clinics are linked to a reduction in costs for community members. This is shown in the study published by the American Journal of Public Health, where it was discovered that Medicaid receivers with access to community clinics show a decrease in healthcare costs compared to Medicaid recipients who do not have that access. Some other positive outcomes associated with community health clinics are job creation, investment in the communities and purchases of goods or services. Based on an analysis done in 2023, there was an increase in 500,000 jobs nationally linked to community health centers. The study also notes that community health centers generated $85 billion in economic output in the United States. Based on this study, community healthcare centers are associated with a "community revival" because they provide jobs in administration, transportation and other local industries which increase local economic investments.

Based on public and community questionnaires, patients report that community health clinics improve access to culturally responsive care and reduce the barriers faced by these communities. They do this through employing multilingual staff, translators, community health workers that tailor outreach, care and other programs to the needs of the specific communities that they serve. Researchers have linked these efforts to improvement in communication between doctors and patients, an increase in trust and engagement with healthcare as an institution in itself. In "public health language" this is called addressing health disparities, which has statistically led to lower mortality and morbidity rates in underserved communities.Researchers have found a reduction in mortality rates by 3.5%, as well as a decrease of preventable hospitalizations by 2.5%. This connection to the community was also noted by public health workers during the COVID-19 pandemic. Community health centers expanded hours of care, educated their communities created outreach programs that facilitated testing and distributed vaccines. This helped with the containment of the virus and the improvement of the health of the community.

Many researchers also note some of the shortcomings of community health centers, like their structural limitations.Many centers face inconsistent federal funding and low Medicaid reimbursements, which creates workforce shortages and may create unstable services because some specialties, like dermatology, require funding to be kept. Community healthcare centers are a resource solution if studied through a Katz framework. Although they improve access, they do not address the structural determinants of health like poverty, systemic inequalities, unfair allocation of funding that plague these communities.

- Community Health
- Federally Qualified Health Center
- Free clinic

== See also ==
- Health Resources and Services Administration
- United States Department of Health and Human Services
