= Long Beach Museum of Art =

- Established: 1950
- Location: 2300 East Ocean Boulevard, Long Beach, California, United States
- Coordinates: 33.7635°N 118.1648°W
- Type: Art museum
- Website: lbma.org

The Long Beach Museum of Art is a museum located on Ocean Boulevard in the Bluff Park neighborhood of Long Beach, California, United States.

The museum's permanent collection includes over 4,000 paintings, drawings, sculptures, works on paper, and decorative arts objects. Particular strengths include American decorative arts objects, early 20th century European art, California Modernism, and contemporary art of California.

The museum is a member of the North American Reciprocal Museums program and is accredited by the American Alliance of Museums.

== History ==
The structure occupied by the Long Beach Museum of Art was built in 1912 as a winter home by Elizabeth Milbank Anderson, a wealthy philanthropist and heir to Jeremiah Milbank, who was a financier, a co-founder of the Borden Company, and a founder of the Chicago, Milwaukee & St. Paul Railroad. According to Fortune Magazine, “a number of Milbanks have been considerable figures in the industrial history of the U.S. and the family has also left its mark on the educational and medical institutions of the country…”

Elizabeth Milbank Anderson (1850–1921) was an energetic, strong-minded woman with a wide range of interests. She was a successful businesswoman, philanthropist and art collector who traveled frequently to Europe. In 1905 she established the Milbank Memorial Fund, which gave grants to various medical and educational projects; this fund is still in existence. She donated a library to Greenwich, Connecticut, and gave three blocks of choice New York City land to Barnard College, upon which was built Milbank Hall. She built public facilities for the poor, such as a sports arena and public baths, and established a program of free school lunches. Her husband, Abram A. Anderson, was a well-known portrait painter and friend of Teddy Roosevelt.

In 1926, the house became Long Beach's first social, athletic and beach club, the Club California Casa Real. Its prominence was soon eclipsed by the Pacific Coast Club, which opened three months later.

From 1929 to 1944, Thomas A. O’Donnell, a pioneer industrialist of the California oil industry, owned the house. He developed the Coalinga field, helped organize American Petroleum Corporation and became president of California Petroleum Co. and the first CEO of the American Petroleum Institute.

During World War II, the house was the U.S. Navy Chief Petty Officer's Club. It was purchased by the City of Long Beach in 1950 for a Municipal Art Center, and designated in 1957 as the Long Beach Museum of Art.

In 1974, the Museum was featured in Reader's Digest's Treasures of America, which took particular note of George Rickey's monumental sculpture at the Museum, Two Lines Up-Speed.

As of 2025, while the museum is still owned by the City of Long Beach, its day-to-day operations are handled by a private foundation, the Long Beach Museum of Art Foundation. In the late 1990s, the foundation undertook a major capital campaign to fund the complete restoration of the historic facilities, relocation of the carriage house and construction of a new two-story exhibition pavilion. The project was completed in September, 2000.

The Elizabeth Milbank Anderson House and carriage house (now the Miller Education Center) were designed and built by the Milwaukee Building Company, an influential architectural firm that did other work for the Milbank family and associates. In 1911, Isaac Milbank, co-founder of the Borden Milk Company and an oil investor, had a magnificent Craftsman summer home constructed for him in Santa Monica by the Milwaukee Building Company. At the same time, the Milwaukee Building Company constructed a similar home on the same street in Santa Monica for retired hotel proprietor Henry Weaver, who owned several Midwest hotels.

The Milwaukee Building Company later became the Los Angeles firm of Meyer & Holler, an eminent firm that constructed numerous landmark buildings. Their most famous designs were the Chinese and Egyptian Theaters in Hollywood. In Long Beach, they designed the Ocean Center Building, Walker's Department Store, and the Fox West Coast Theater (now demolished).

== Visiting ==
The museum is open Thursday through Sunday, 11am-5pm.

The museum also has an oceanview café with outdoor tables, Claire's at the Museum, that is open for lunch and also has a popular weekend brunch. The restaurant is named in honor of Claire Falkenstein, an American sculptor who created the restaurant's centerpiece, Structure and Flow, a fountain with twisting latticework, which was donated to the museum in 1972.

== Education and programs ==
The museum hosts exhibitions of artwork made by children and students of the community in its Toyota Student Gallery.

Since 1999, the Museum has provided education through its KidsVisions Program to all fifth grade students in the Long Beach Unified School District. The program content follows the guidelines of the National, State, and Long Beach School District Standards for Visual and Performing Arts.

The museum offers Toyota Tours free of charge to all school groups (public or private).

The museum schedules educator-led tours for the general public for groups of 10–15.

== See also ==
- List of City of Long Beach Historic Landmarks
- Sue Ann Robinson
