= Margaret Blenkner =

American academic

Margaret Blenkner (1909–1973) was an American professor.

== Early life and education ==
Born in the United States, Blenkner obtained a B.A. from the University of Washington in 1930. She earned her M.A. from the University of Minnesota in 1941 and completed her Ph.D. in social welfare at Columbia University School of Social Work in 1957.

== Career ==
From 1948 to 1962, Blenkner was affiliated with the Institute of Welfare Research at the Community Service Society of New York. She then moved to the Benjamin Rose Institute of Cleveland, where she held the position of Director of Research from 1962 to 1969. Subsequently, she took on a role as a professor of social work at the University of Georgia, serving from 1969 to 1971.

Blenkner also served the Project Director of the Chronic Disease Module Unit at Michigan State University.
