= Sue Robinson =

Sue Robinson may refer to:

- Sue Lewis Robinson (born 1952), United States district judge
- Sue Ann Robinson, American book artist, educator, and museum professional
