= West Side Community Health Services =

Health care organization in Minnesota, US

West Side Community Health Services (WSCHS) is a community health care organization based in Saint Paul, Minnesota, United States, that serves the Twin Cities metropolitan area. It is Minnesota's largest community clinic organization, providing health care at 18 locations to some 35,000 patients.

WSCHS was founded in 1969 as People's Health Center, a group of volunteers who worked in a church basement to provide free health care services for Spanish-speaking residents of St. Paul's West Side. At first, they could work with only six or seven patients each day.

Today it focuses on providing care to low-income and immigrant groups. The United States Department of Health and Human Services provides significant financial support to the organization. The clinics also receive substantial funding from the state of Minnesota through the Medicaid program, although they have sometimes had trouble collecting the money from the state. Many of the patients served by the organization have no insurance at all, which poses a serious financial challenge.

In 2004, WSCHS began an affiliation with the Pfizer Sharing the Care program, which gives low-income patients access to prescription medications that they could not otherwise afford to buy.

== See also ==
- Community health centers in the United States
- Federally Qualified Health Center
- Free clinic
