= Abraham Archibald Anderson =

American artist, rancher and philanthropist

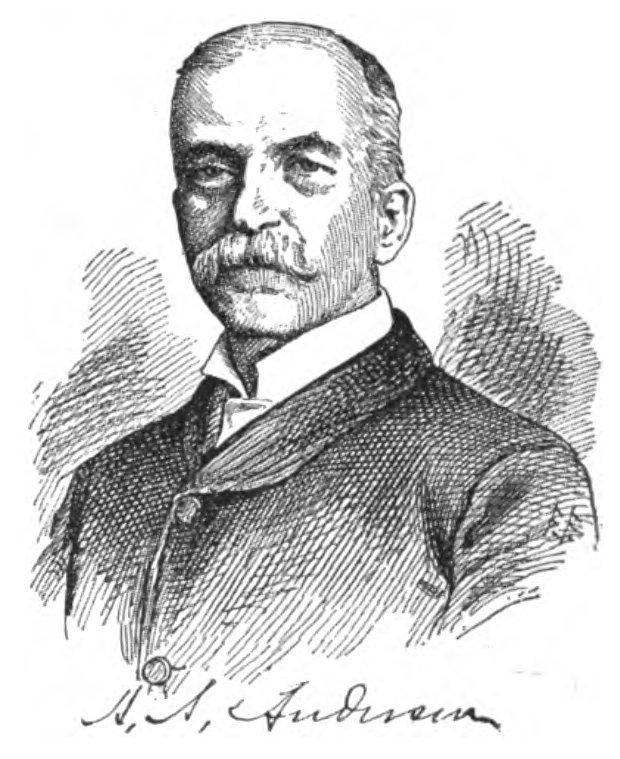
Abraham Archibald Anderson

Abraham Archibald Anderson (1846 – 1940) was an American artist, rancher and philanthropist.

== Biography ==
Anderson was born in New Jersey as one of ten children of William Anderson (1814 – 1887), a civil engineer turned Dutch Reformed Church Reverend, and Sarah Louise Ryerson (1818–1907). After an initial career as a businessman, on June 15, 1876 Anderson married Elizabeth Milbank, the reform-minded daughter of the investor Jeremiah Milbank and an heiress to his considerable fortune.

Beginning in the mid-1870s, Anderson studied art in Paris, first with Léon Bonnat, then under Alexandre Cabanel, Fernand Cormon, Auguste Rodin, and Raphaël Collin. Anderson developed a reputation for his portraits. His 1889 portrait of Thomas Alva Edison is in the National Portrait Gallery in Washington D.C.

In 1890, Anderson organized the American Art Association in Paris, a beneficial mutual-aid society for American art students. He was its president until 1912; it lasted until 1932.

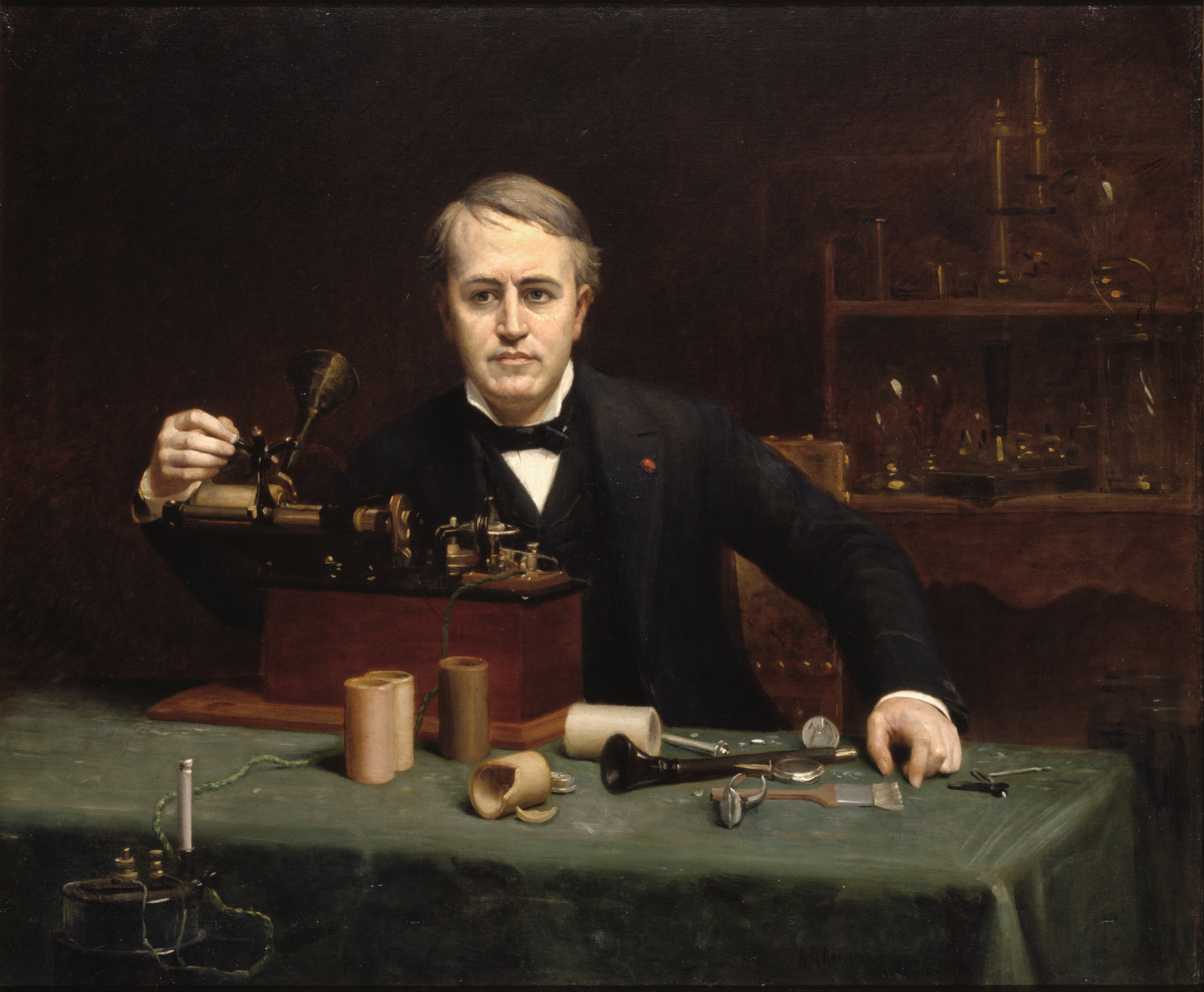
Portrait of Thomas Edison (1890), National Portrait Gallery

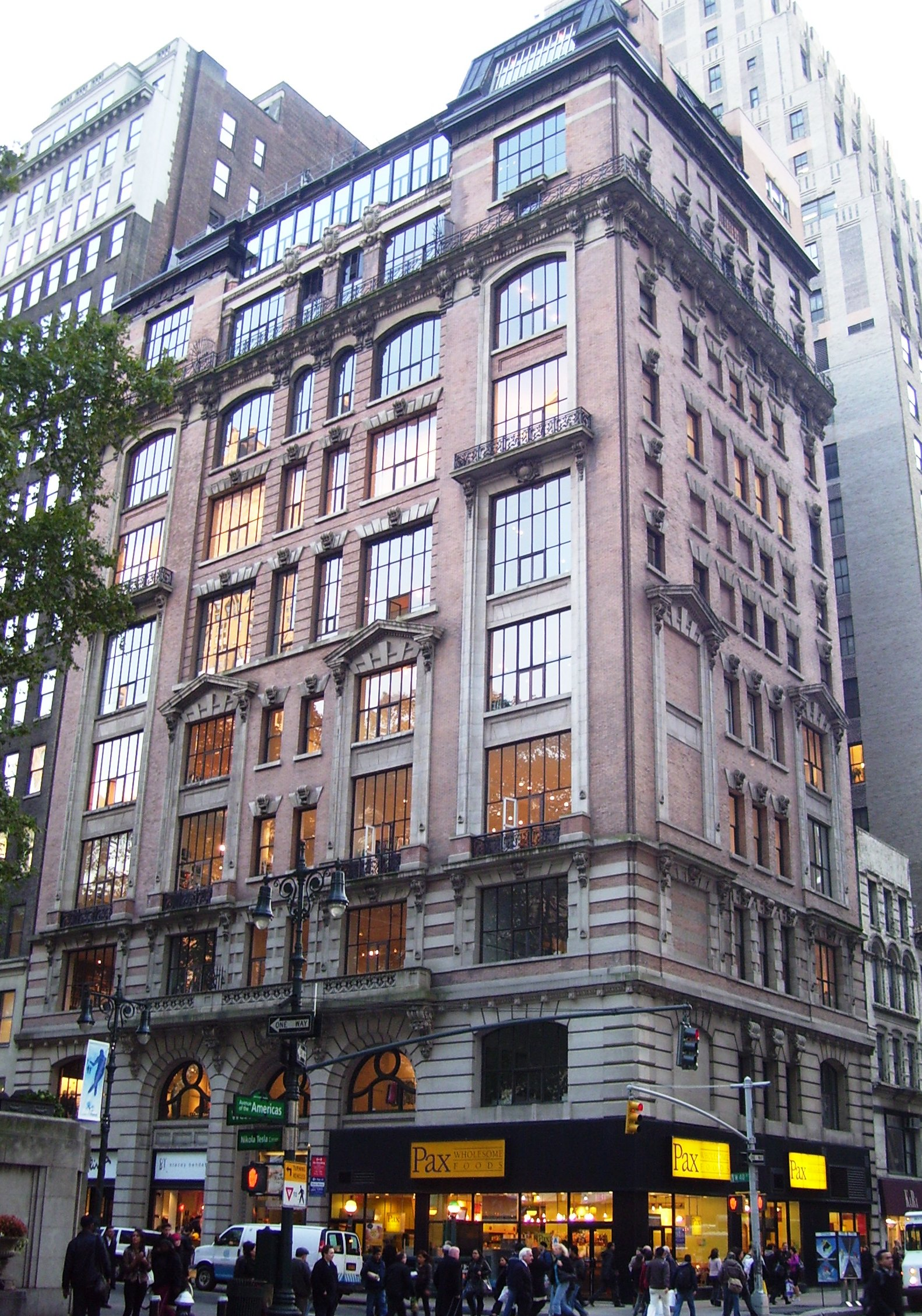
Anderson developed the Bryant Park Studios in 1900–1901.

In 1900, Anderson commissioned the 10-story Bryant Park Studios building from the New York society architect Charles A. Rich. Situated on the south side of Bryant Park, its generous windows and high-ceilings were designed specifically for artists. Anderson maintained his own suite on the top floor until the end of his life. Bryant Park Studios (popularly known as The Beaux Arts Building after the Café des Beaux Arts on the ground floor) became immediately popular, and tenants included Edward Steichen, Fernand Léger, Robert Henri, Katherine Sophie Dreier, J. C. Leyendecker, Jo Davidson, Florine Stettheimer, Edward Suydam, Gari Melchers, Stella Marks, John La Gatta, Julian Rix, Rodrigues Ottolengui, Haskell Coffin, Leon Gordon, Irving Penn, and Kurt Seligmann. The building still stands.

Returning to the United States in the summers, Anderson bought land in northwestern Wyoming and developed it into the Palette Ranch. He personally designed William "Buffalo Bill" Cody's guest ranch Pahaska Tepee, and his own home, Anderson Lodge. That lodge became the first administrative headquarters for the Yellowstone Forest Reserve in 1902, as President Theodore Roosevelt named Anderson as the first Special Superintendent of Forest Reserves. Anderson played a significant role in the preservation and development of the Yellowstone region and was an early member, and former president of, the Camp-Fire Club of America.

His autobiography, Experiences and Impressions, was published in 1933. Anderson's daughter, Eleanor Campbell, founded the Judson Health Center in 1921.
