= United Charities Building =

- U.S. National Register of Historic Places
- U.S. National Historic Landmark
- New York State Register of Historic Places
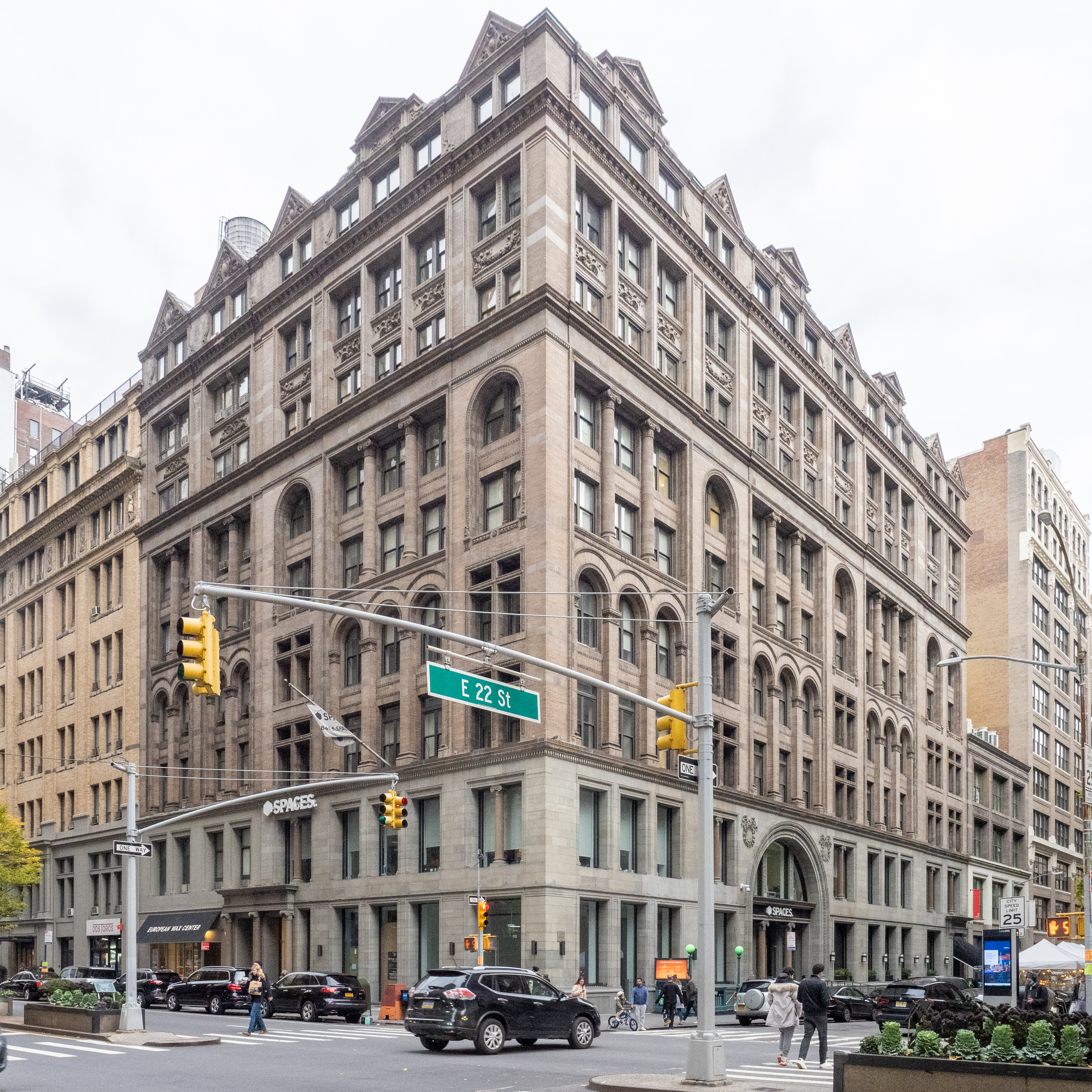
- Location: 105 East 22nd St. (287 Park Ave. South); Manhattan, New York City
- Coordinates: 40°44′22″N 73°59′11″W
- Built: 1893 with additions in 1897 and 1915
- Architect: Robert H. Robertson (original building); James Baker (additions)
- Architectural style: Renaissance Romanesque
- NRHP reference No.: 85000661
- NYSRHP No.: 06101.001817

Significant dates
- Added to NRHP: March 28, 1985
- Designated NHL: July 17, 1991
- Designated NYSRHP: February 14, 1985

The United Charities Building, also known as United Charities Building Complex, is at 105 East 22nd Street or 287 Park Avenue South, in the Gramercy Park neighborhood of Manhattan, New York City, near the border of the Flatiron District. It was built in 1893 by John Stewart Kennedy, a wealthy banker, for the Charity Organization Society. It was designated a National Historic Landmark in 1991 for the role the Charity Organization Society played in promoting progressive social welfare policies, including the development of academic disciplines in that area.

== History ==
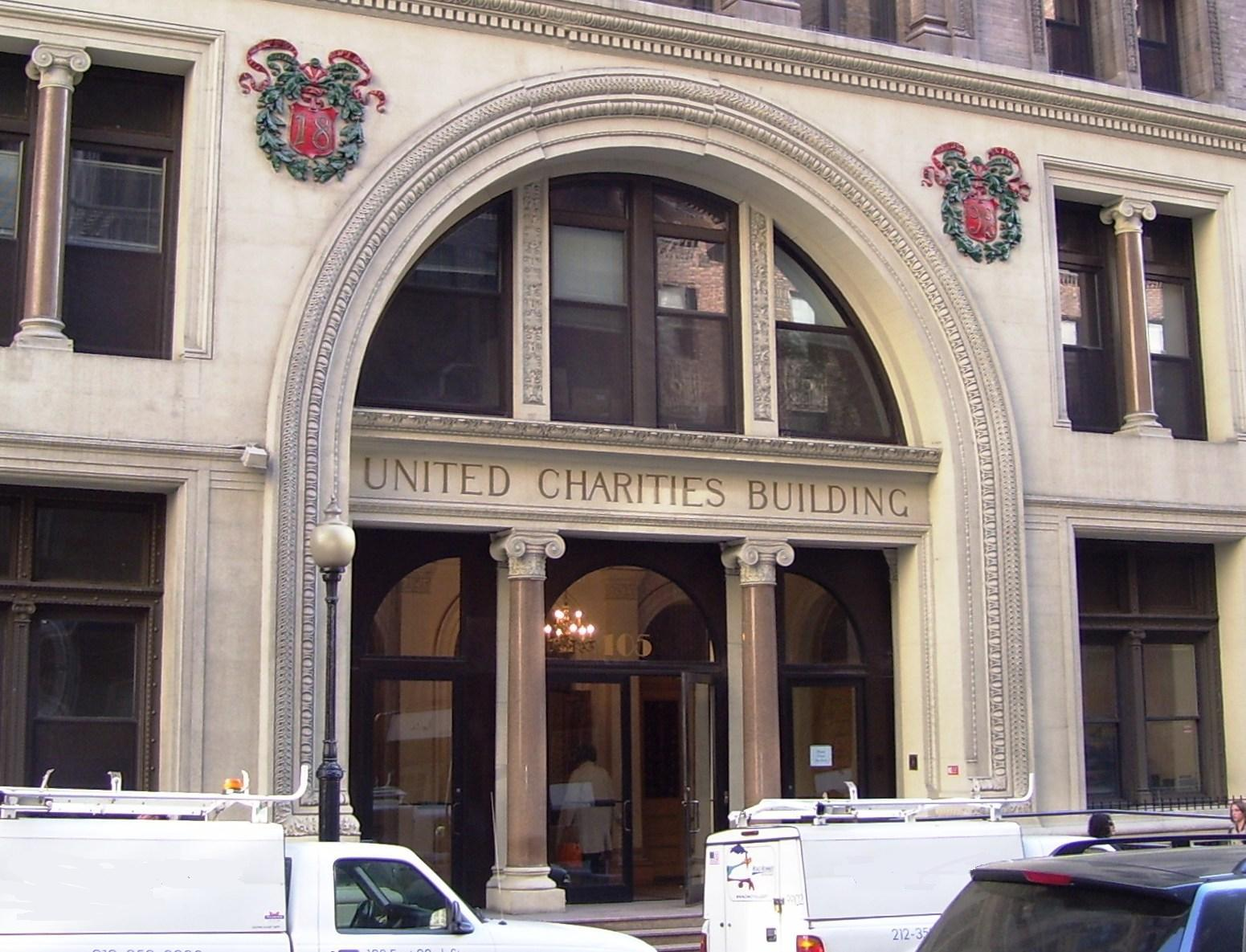
The entrance to the main building at 105 East 22nd Street

The Charity Organization Society was something like a "Charity Trust", in that it represented the combined resources of many Protestant charities, including more than a thousand prominent families and over 500 churches and societies. The United Charities Building also housed others of Kennedy's favorite charities, including the Charity Organization Society, Association for Improving the Condition of the Poor, the Children's Aid Society, and the New York Mission and Tract Society, providing them with a low cost location for their operations. Other charities were allowed to rent space at below market rates. In 1891, the New York City Consumers' League, founded by Josephine Shaw Lowell, Helen Campbell – author of the 1882 book The Problem of the Poor – and Dr. Mary Putnam Jacobi, established its offices in the building.

R. H. Robertson, who designed the building, assisted by the firm of Rowe & Baker, was selected by Kennedy as the architect because of his extensive experience with charitable buildings, including the YWCA on East 15th Street. James Baker, Robertson's nephew, may have worked on some of the original exterior, but did do the later additions to the building in 1897, when the original mansard roof was removed and three stories were added to the original seven, and in 1915, when a four-story addition at 111 East 22nd was constructed.

Although the main building still houses some charitable organizations, such as the Community Service Society, today it is used for multiple purposes. The northern part of the main building, which had been partitioned from the rest and renamed the Kennedy Building, is now apartments, while the 22nd Street extension became the headquarters for the Dockworkers' Union in 1946. The union sold the building in the 1980s and it was converted for commercial use. In the 1980s television show Mickey Spillane's Mike Hammer, the fictitious private detective's office was located on the third floor, corner office 311 specifically as seen in numerous establishing shots in the show, at the corner of Park Avenue and 22nd Street.

Hawksmoor, a British steakhouse and cocktail bar, leased space at the United Charities Building in 2018 and moved there in late 2021.

The complex was declared a National Historic Landmark in 1991, and is part of a proposed extension to the Gramercy Park Historic District. However, architecturally the building is described in the AIA Guide to New York City as "bulky and boring", with the comment that "even Robertson could occasionally produce a bland product." The building sits across 22nd Street from the headquarters of the Federation of Protestant Welfare Agencies, which was built in 1892.
