= Robert Milham Hartley =

American activist (1796–1881)

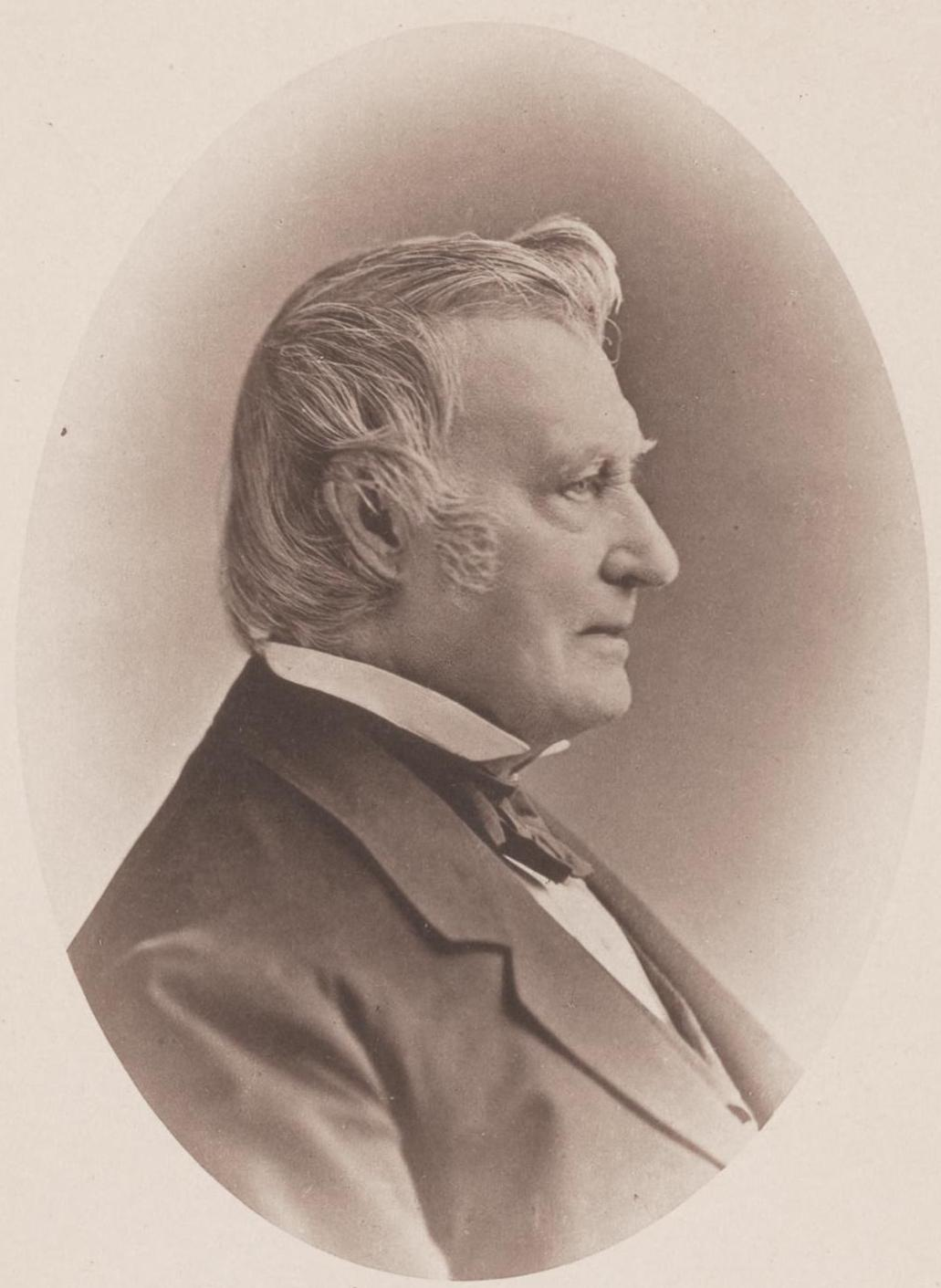
Robert Milham Hartley

Robert Milham Hartley (February 17, 1796 – March 3, 1881) was an American religious activist. He was one of the co-founders of the temperance movement in New York and during his life sought to improve the conditions and health of the poor.

== Early life and influences ==
Hartley was born in Cockermouth, on February 17, 1796, the fourth child and eldest son of Isaac Hartley and Isabella Johnson. Hartley's father moved to America in 1797 and his family followed in 1799; they tried to carve out a living on new land in Charlton, Saratoga County, New York, but realised that they were not suited to this lifestyle. After about two years, Hartley's father started a mercantile business in the nearby city of Schenectady, New York. A short while later they moved from the City into the country for health reasons, but this came too late for Hartley's mother who died in about 1807. Hartley's father remarried in about 1812 and the family moved to Broadalbin, New York.

At age 16, Hartley took a position with a woolen manufacturer 10 miles from home where he lived with the owner's family. The location was isolated and lacked any form of religious ministry; Hartley considered that this had led to a lowering of moral standards in the community and joined with others in establishing regular prayer meetings. After 4 years, Hartley returned to work for his father and later attended Fairfield Academy, Herkimer County. In 1822, he moved to New York and was employed in dry goods, later starting his own mercantile business. In 1824 he married Catherine Munson, daughter of the Hon. Reuben Munson and Abigail Wiltse.

== Career ==
=== Work with the Presbyterian Church ===
Hartley was a member of the Presbyterian Church since his youth and joined the Young People's Missionary Society whilst in his teens. (Note: In England Hartley’s father had been a religious Dissenter, whereas his wife was raised in the Established Church.) Living In New York in 1824 he became a member of the Central Presbyterian Church and helped to distribute religious literature. It was at this time that he saw the squalid living conditions that the poor had to contend with in the City. Hartley later became a ruling elder at the Central Presbyterian Church at Broome Street and was instrumental in the move to Madison Square in 1854.

=== 97th Regiment of State Infantry ===
In 1827, Hartley was commissioned as Captain in the 97th Regiment of State Infantry – even though he had no military experience. For a time, this overshadowed his philanthropic and religious works whilst he came to terms with this new role.

=== New York Temperance Society ===
Hartley was one of the founders of the New York Temperance Society in 1829. Four year later he became the Corresponding Secretary and Agent. He set about reorganising and extending the scope of the society; publications were circulated and newspapers used to spread the message. Many thousands of the residents signed the pledge, and claims were made that the campaign led to a reduction in crime and pauperism. During his investigations he discovered that much of the waste product from the brewing and distilling industries was used to feed farm animals. He claimed that there was a link between the production of unhealthy milk from these animals and a rise in infant mortality.

=== New York Association for Improving the Condition of the Poor ===
In 1842, Hartley resigned his position as Corresponding Secretary and Agent having fulfilled his mission. He was asked to continue as the Secretary and Treasurer, and held this position for many years. He next became the Corresponding Secretary and Agent for the New York Association for Improving the Condition of the Poor. The association's mission was to help people find their way out of impoverishment, providing guidance, advice and the bare minimum of charitable aid. Applicants were assessed by volunteers and subjected to strict selection criteria. Those that were already entitled to support from other organisations, such as the old and infirmed, were excluded from the scheme. Over the following years the association's scope expanded to include medical aid, tenement housing, child protection, hygiene, sanitary improvements, relief for the disabled and support for soldiers and sailors injured during the Civil War. Other work included a census on social conditions in the city and a report on the situation of those who were crowded together in damp and badly ventilated cellars. Hartley eventually resigned from the association due to failing health in 1876. He also resigned as the Secretary of the Presbyterian Hospital at this time, an establishment that he helped to found in 1868.

Several other charitable organisations evolved from the work being done by the Association. These included the New York Juvenile Asylum, the Demilt and North Western Dispensaries, Public Washing and Bathing Establishment, Children's Aid Society, Working Men's Home and the Society for the Ruptured and Crippled.

== Personal life ==
Hartley and his wife had a large family, including Isaac Smithson Hartley and Marcellus Hartley.

Hartley's wife Catherine died in 1873 and he died on March 3, 1881, the same day as his grand-daughter Emma died; she was the wife of Norman White Dodge and mother of Marcellus Hartley Dodge Sr., who had been born three days before.
