= Judson Health Center =

Clinic in Manhattan, New York

- Named after: Judson Memorial Church
- Merged into: New York City Health and Hospitals Corporation
- Successor: NYC Health + Hospitals/Gotham Health Judson
- Established: 1921; 105 years ago
- Founders: Eleanor A. Campbell
- Founded at: Judson Memorial Church
- Purpose: community health center
- Headquarters: 34 Spring Street, Nolita, Manhattan
- Location: New York City, US
- Coordinates: 40.7217°N 73.9958°W
- Region served: Lower Manhattan

Judson Health Center, founded in 1921, was an early Community Health Center in New York City. It was inspired by the Rev. Alonzo Ray Petty of the Baptist Judson Memorial Church located at 55 Washington Square South.

Petty appealed to fellow Baptist and physician Eleanor A. Campbell to start the health and dental clinic, initially located in the church's basement, in order to provide care to the many Italian immigrants living on the west side of lower Manhattan. Many of these 45,000 residents suffered from poor nutrition; rickets was prevalent among many of the area's children. The health center quickly outgrew its space and in 1922 moved to Judson House at 237 Thompson Street. In 1924 the clinic provided healthcare to 22,000 visitors and also conducted 14,000 field visits, making the center the largest of its kind in the U.S. In 1950 the Center moved to 34 Spring Street and served residents living in the area bordered by Broadway, Washington Square and the Hudson River. The Center provided healthcare in over one million separate visits to residents and immigrants between 1921 and 1957, when Dr. Campbell was awarded the Star of Italian Solidarity by the Italian Government. Campbell, who refused any wages for her services throughout her lifetime, was born Eleanor Milbank Anderson, the daughter of philanthropist and public health advocate Elizabeth Milbank Anderson (1850-1921) and the artist Abraham Archibald Anderson (1846-1940).

Judson Health Center continues to operate today at the Spring Street location under the auspices of the New York City Health and Hospitals Corporation.
