= Anderson Lodge =

Historic house in Wyoming, United States

- U.S. National Register of Historic Places
- U.S. Historic district
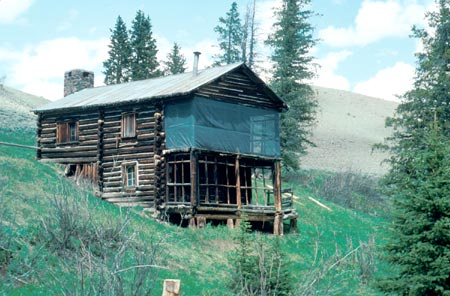

- Location within Wyoming Location within the United States
- Location: Greybull Ranger District, Shoshone National Forest, Meeteetse, Wyoming
- Coordinates: 44°6′5.5″N 109°25′59.3″W
- Built: 1890
- Architect: Abraham Archibald Anderson
- Architectural style: Rustic
- NRHP reference No.: 87001548
- Added to NRHP: September 14, 1987

The Anderson Lodge or Anderson Studio was built in 1890 in the Absaroka Range west of Meeteetse, Wyoming, in what was then the Yellowstone Park Timber Land Reserve, soon renamed the Yellowstone Forest Reserve. The two-story rustic log structure became the home of rancher and artist Abraham Archibald Anderson from 1901 to 1905. Anderson played a significant role in the development of the forest reserve as Special Superintendent of Forest Reserves, and the Anderson Lodge was used as an administrative building for the forest.

The National Register lists the site as a historic district, including the Anderson Lodge, a one-room log cabin, an outhouse, two log footbridges, a developed spring, and a pole corral. Its significance is related to its wilderness setting, its association with the beginning of a national conservation movement in the United States, and the early history of the United States Forest Service.

The lodge location is now managed as part of Shoshone National Forest, in the Washakie Wilderness.
