= Sue Ann Robinson =

American book artist

Sue Ann Robinson is an American book artist, educator, and museum professional. She attended the University of New Hampshire and Columbia University. She has had a long association with the Long Beach Museum of Art, starting in 1988 as an Artist-in-Residence and moving on to other positions including Director of Education, Director of Collections and Exhibitions, and Curator Emerita

In the 1970s Robinson and Marcella Brenner established the Museum Education Program at George Washington University.

Her work is in the collection of the Getty Research Institute library, the Walker Art Center, and the National Museum of Women in the Arts.

Robinson had held several residencies including the Women's Studio Workshop, the California Arts Council, and the Visual Studies Workshop. She is a member of the College Book Art Association and the Guild of Bookworkers.
