= Jeremiah Milbank =

American businessman (1818–1884)

Jeremiah Milbank (April 18, 1818 – June 1, 1884) American businessman, was a successful dry goods commission merchant, speculator in Texas territorial bonds, manufacturer, and railroad investor. His most successful business efforts were the New York Condensed Milk Company (1857, renamed the Borden Company in 1899) which he co-founded with inventor Gail Borden and the Chicago, Milwaukee and St. Paul Railway (1876) where he was a member of the executive committee of the Board of Directors. Milbank was a founder and president of the board of trustees of the Madison Avenue Baptist Church at 31st. Street, New York City, and trustee of the Baptist's Rochester Theological Seminary (University of Rochester). The city of Milbank, South Dakota, which is the seat of Grant County, was founded in 1880 and named in his honor. Among other interests, Milbank was in 1870 an original subscriber of the Metropolitan Museum of Art and owned a box at the Metropolitan Opera.

== Biography ==
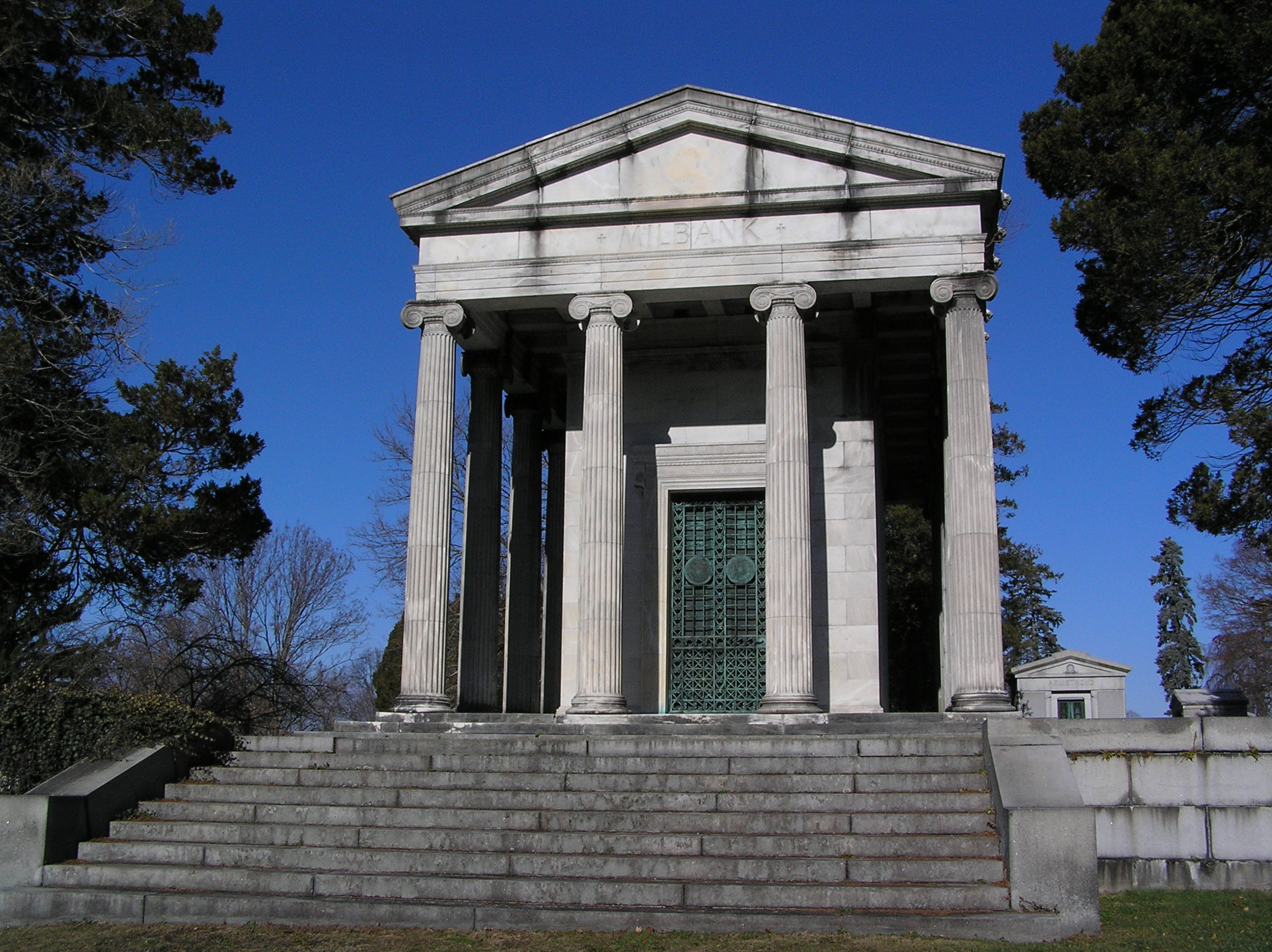
Milbank mausoleum in Putnam Cemetery

Milbank was born April 18, 1818, at 51/2 Bancker Street, New York City, the eleventh child of Samuel Milbank (1775–1853) and Elizabeth Wall Milbank. He married Elizabeth Lake (1827–1891), the daughter of banker Joseph Lake of New York and Greenwich, CT on May 11, 1847. At the time of his death on June 1, 1884, his fortune was estimated at $32 million, one-half of which he bequeathed to his son Joseph and the remainder to his daughter Elizabeth Milbank Anderson (Mrs. Abraham Archibald Anderson) and his granddaughter, Eleanor Milbank Anderson (1878–1959). His grandson Jeremiah Milbank was a close friend of Herbert Hoover and a prominent philanthropist for people with disabilities. Milbank was buried in Greenwood Cemetery, Brooklyn and in 1917 interred in the Milbank Mausoleum, Putnam Cemetery, Greenwich, Connecticut.
