= Madison Avenue Baptist Church =

Church in Manhattan, New York

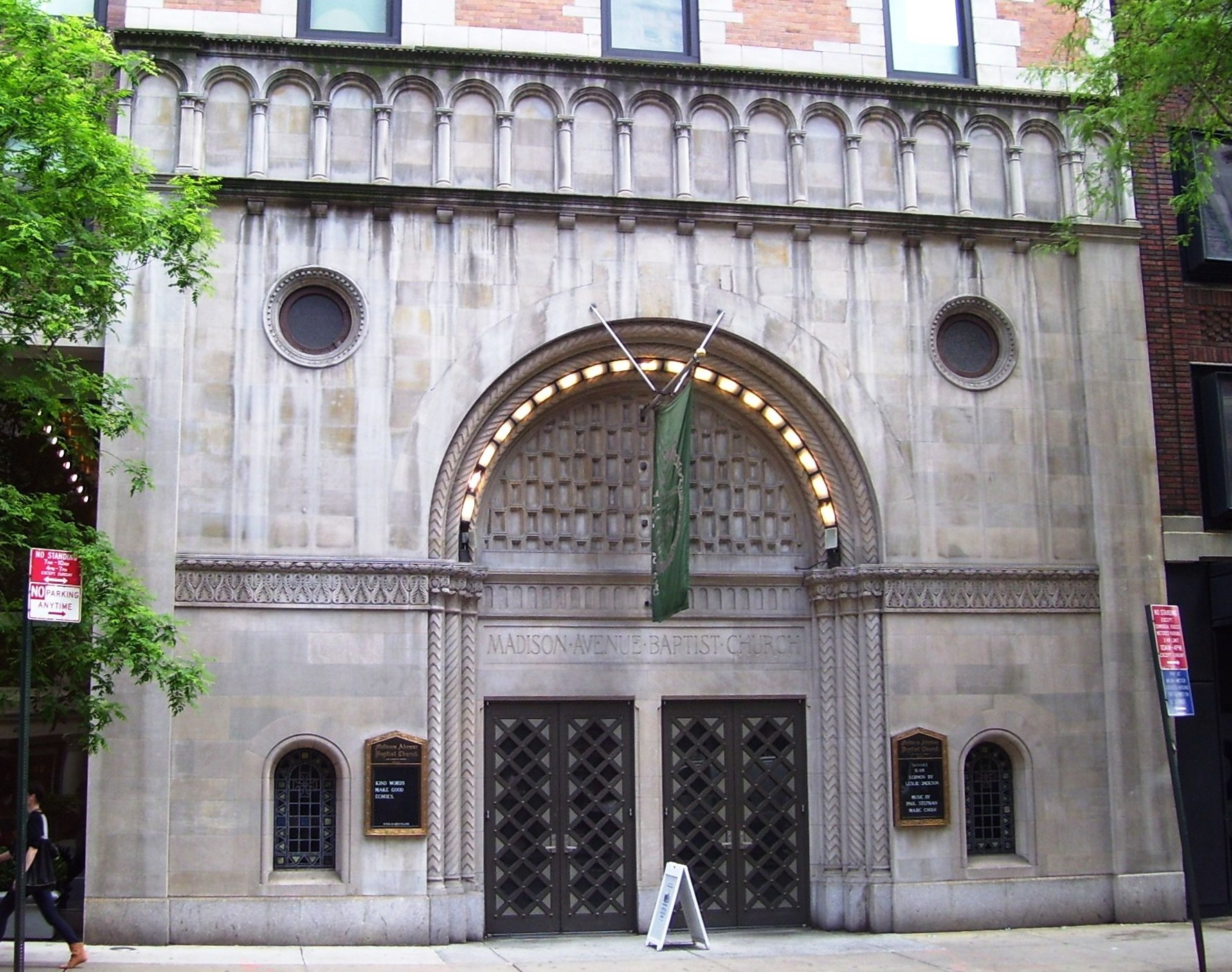
- The church's entrance in 2011
- Madison Avenue Baptist Church
- 40°44′37.8″N 73°58′54.7″W
- Address: 129 Madison Avenue; Manhattan, New York City
- Country: United States
- Denomination: Baptist
- Website: mabcnyc.org

Clergy
- Pastor: Rev. Susan Sparks

The Madison Avenue Baptist Church is a progressive Baptist church located in Manhattan, New York City. It is affiliated with the Alliance of Baptists, the American Baptist Churches USA, the Association of Welcoming and Affirming Baptists, and the Baptist Peace Fellowship of North America.

== History ==
It was first chartered in 1848 as Rose Hill Baptist Sunday School and Church, on East 30th Street between Third and Lexington Avenues in Manhattan, New York City. Rose Hill was a house church with twelve members. In 1849, Rose Hill Baptist became the Lexington Avenue Baptist Church with twenty-eight members at 154 Lexington Avenue and 30th Street in a new Lombardian Romanesque-style edifice, which is now the First Moravian Church. Prominent Baptist Jeremiah Milbank – developer of condensed milk with inventor Gail Borden – and other congregational leaders, including the Colgate family, decided to move the church east in order to avoid the falling cinders emitted by the nearby Third Avenue elevated railroad. Five lots at East 31st Street and Madison Avenue became the site of a grand new structure, built in 1850.

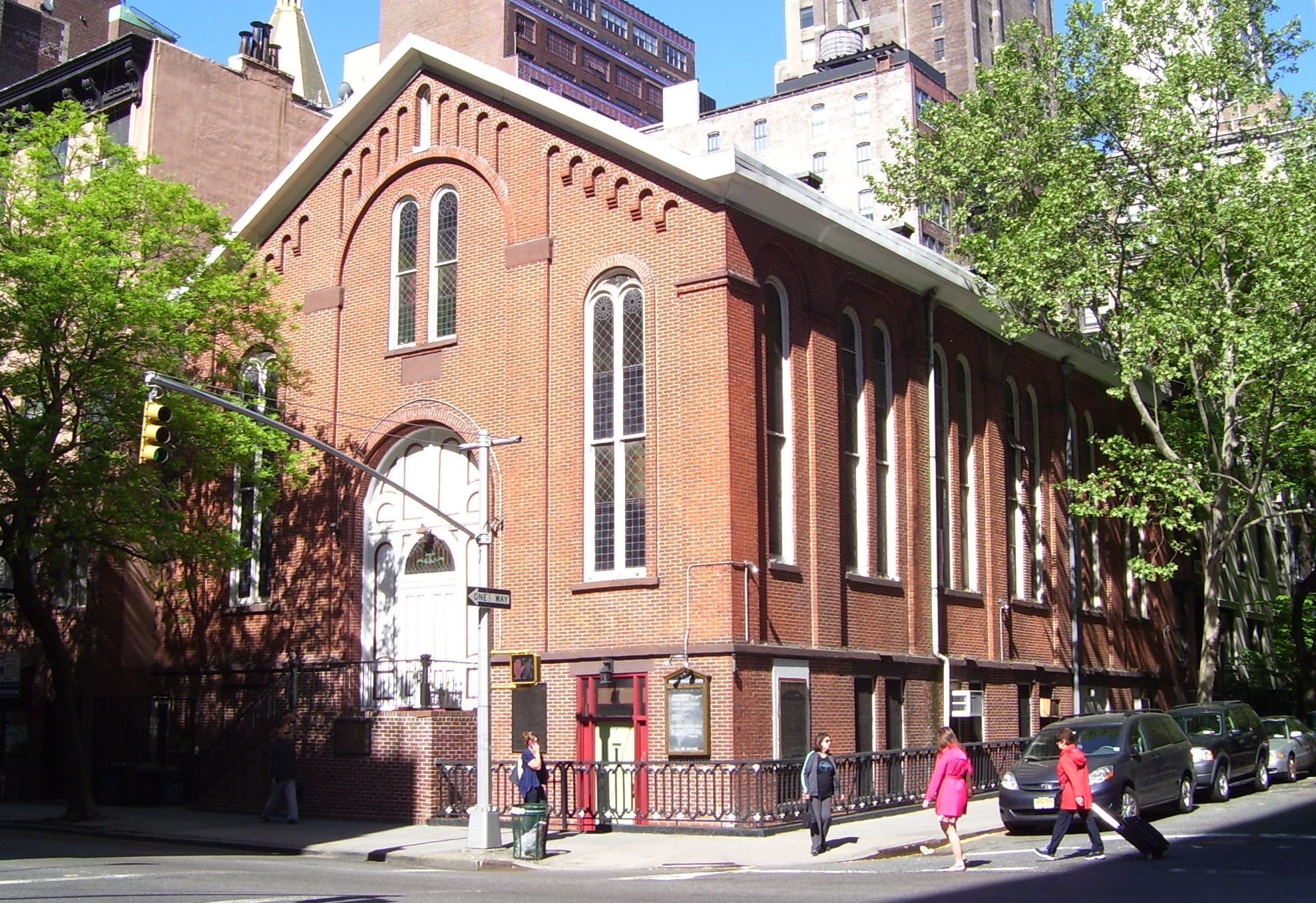
The church's second home, built in 1849, at 154 Lexington Avenue, now First Moravian Church.

In 1885, following the death of Jeremiah Milbank, his wife, Elizabeth Lake Milbank, donated a memorial of stained glass windows by F. X. Zettler of Germany – sculptor of Infalbert's "Angel of the Gospel" statue – depicting the life, healing ministry, death and resurrection of Jesus. These were installed behind the pulpit.

In 1903 the Ordination of Harry Emerson Fosdick – the most prominent liberal Baptist minister of the early 20th Century and author of the hymn "God of Grace and God of Glory" – was held at MABC. Fosdick was later the minister of the Park Avenue Baptist Church, today's Central Presbyterian Church at 593 Park Avenue, and then of Riverside Church.

In 1930 the parish leased its property to be developed into the Roger Williams Hotel at 131 Madison Avenue, designed by Jardine, Hill & Murdock and named for the Baptist founder of Rhode Island, with the church sanctuary to be included in the 15-story building. New stained glass was added depicting the writers of the Gospel and their symbols: Matthew/Cherub, Mark/Lion, Luke/Ox, and John/Eagle. The church's parish house, built in 1906, was located around the corner at 30 East 31st Street between Madison Avenue and Park Avenue South. It was sold to a commercial developer in June 2014, demolished in 2015, and replaced by a residential building.

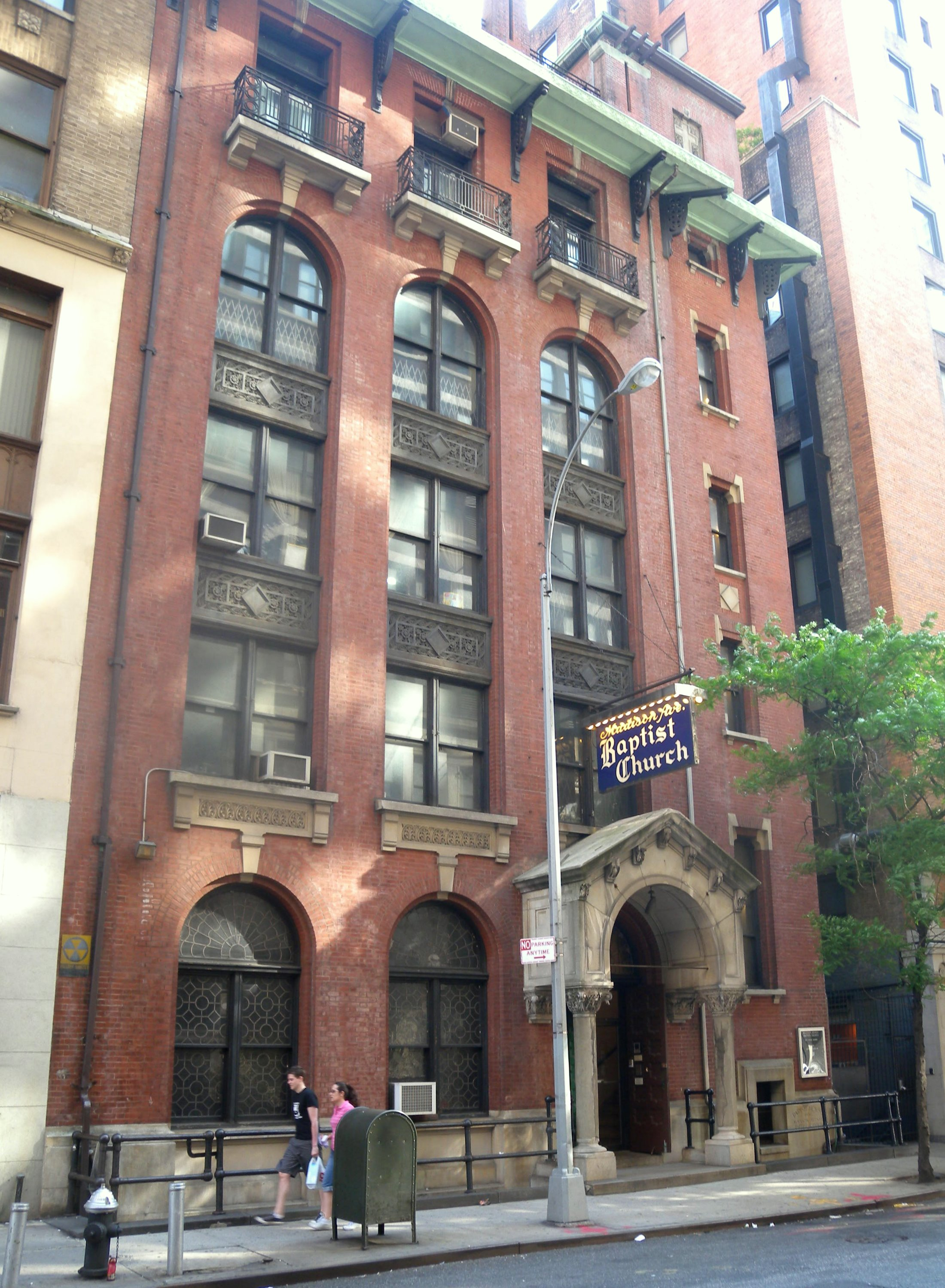
The parish house on 31st Street, since demolished

In the early 1980s, MABC began the Sunday Afternoon Meal for Seniors (free meals for the midtown elderly) and also a Shelter for the Homeless, and in 1992 the church began ministries to persons with AIDS at Bellevue Hospital sponsored by the Bellevue Chaplains' Office.

== Theology ==
It is affiliated with the Alliance of Baptists, the American Baptist Churches USA, and the Baptist Peace Fellowship of North America.

In 1993, MABC became a Charter member of the Association of Welcoming and Affirming Baptists made up of American Baptist Churches and Organizations desiring to be inclusive of gays and lesbians. The church continues today with an active ministry.

== In popular culture ==
- On April 4, 1971, the "first" U.S. concert version of Andrew Lloyd Webber and Tim Rice's Jesus Christ Superstar was presented by the Bel Canto Opera in the church.
