= Milbank Quarterly =

- Discipline: Health policy
- Language: English
- Edited by: Alan B. Cohen

Publication details
- Former name(s): The Milbank Memorial Fund Quarterly: Health and Society, The Milbank Memorial Fund Quarterly, The Milbank Memorial Fund Quarterly Bulletin
- History: 1923–present
- Publisher: John Wiley & Sons on behalf of the Milbank Memorial Fund (United States)
- Frequency: Quarterly
- Impact factor: 4.911 (2020)

Standard abbreviations
- ISO 4: Milbank Q.

Indexing
- CODEN: MIQUES
- ISSN: 0887-378X (print); 1468-0009 (web)
- LCCN: 86643667
- JSTOR: 0887378X
- OCLC no.: 34945088

Links
- Journal homepage; Online access; Online archive; Journal page at Milbank Memorial Fund website

The Milbank Quarterly is a quarterly peer-reviewed healthcare journal covering health care policy. It was established in 1923 and is published by John Wiley & Sons on behalf of the Milbank Memorial Fund, an endowed national foundation funded by Elizabeth Milbank Anderson that supports research of issues related to population health and health policy. It covers topics such as the impact of social factors on health, prevention, allocation of health care resources, legal and ethical issues in health policy, health and health care administration, and the organization and financing of health care.

The Milbank Memorial Fund has historically funded controversial health care practices, including the Tuskegee Syphilis Study, in which African Americans were systematically and deceptively denied critical care for the benefit of the white scientific community. In June 2022, it apologized to descendants of the study’s victims for its role in the study.

== Abstracting and indexing ==
The journal is abstracted and indexed by:

- Abstracts in Health Care Management Studies
- Abstracts on Hygiene & Communicable Diseases
- Abstracts in Social Gerontology
- Academic ASAP
- Academic Search Elite and Academic Search Premier
- Applied Social Sciences Index and Abstracts
- Biological Abstracts
- Chemical Abstracts
- Current Contents/Social & Behavioral Science
- Current Literature in Family Planning
- EBSCO databases
- Index Medicus
- InfoTrac OneFile
- International Bibliography of Sociology
- International Bibliography of the Social Sciences
- Nutrition Abstracts and Reviews
- ProQuest
- PsycINFO
- Psychological Abstracts
- Science Citation Index
- Social Sciences Citation Index

According to the Journal Citation Reports, the journal has a 2020 impact factor of 4.911, ranking it 16th out of 108 journals in the category "Health Care Sciences & Services" and 8th out of 88 journals in the category "Health Policy & Services".

== Previous titles ==
The journal was established in 1923 as The Milbank Memorial Fund Quarterly Bulletin. In 1934 it was renamed The Milbank Memorial Fund Quarterly, and in 1973 The Milbank Memorial Fund Quarterly: Health and Society. It obtained its current name in 1986.
