= Association for Improving the Condition of the Poor =

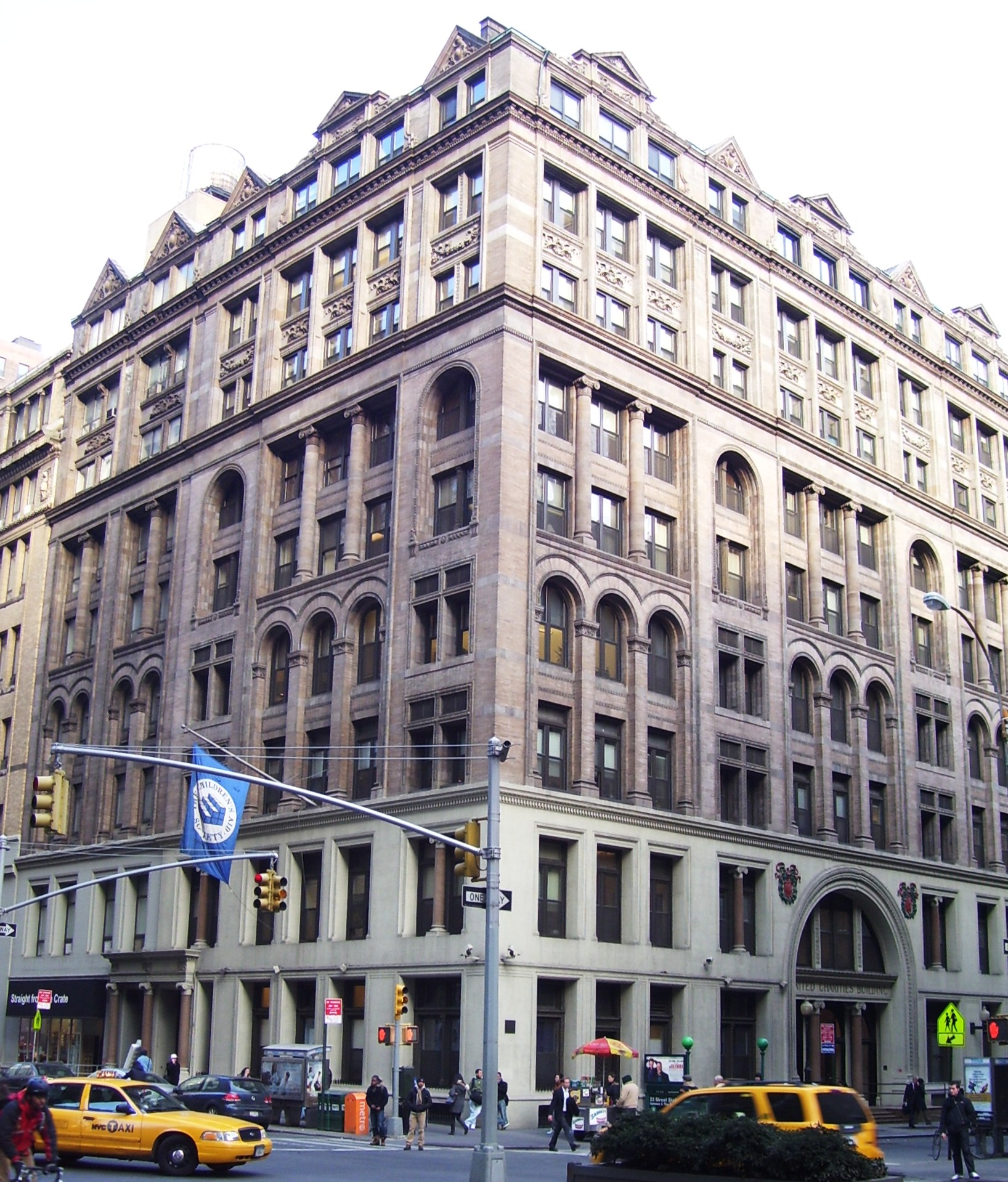
The United Charities Building, after 1893 the headquarters of the AICP and other charitable organizations; the successor organization, the Community Service Society is still located there

The Association for Improving the Condition of the Poor (AICP) was a charitable organization in New York City, established in 1843 and incorporated in 1848 with the aim of helping the deserving poor and providing for their moral uplift. It soon was a model for charity organizations throughout the nation. It embraced a tri-part mission. Led by Robert Milham Hartley, AICP worked to establish an urban sanitation movement, provide immediate relief and access to jobs to poor neighbors, and also contribute to their spiritual uplift in a Protestant context. The Association was one of the most active and innovative charity organizations in New York, pioneering many private-public partnerships in education, healthcare and social services. It merged in 1939 with the Charity Organization Society to form the Community Service Society of New York, which continues to operate in New York City.

== History ==
The AICP was established in 1843 as an offshoot of the New York City Mission Society due to the stress put on that organization's charitable activities as a result of the Panic of 1837 and the depression which followed. It pre-dated other well-known charitable organizations such as the Children's Aid Society, founded in 1854, the State Charities Aid Association (1872) and the Charity Organization Society (1884). The directors of the new charity, made up of some of the city's richest people, believed that the existence of the city's apparently permanent indigent population was not due to economic conditions or adversity, but instead could be best explained by some fault in the poor themselves, which the AICP was determined to fix. The organization was consistently opposed to "gratuitous charity", meaning charity efforts which were not tied to moral reformation, such as free soup kitchens and missions which provided shelter to all without regard to their character. It particularly disdained governmental efforts to alleviate the plight of the poor, as opposed the work of private agencies such as itself, although it was convinced to accept large amounts of money from the city after 1876, as one of the favored organizations chosen as a conduit for governmental largesse.

Robert Milham Hartley, formerly secretary of the New-York City Temperance Society for 10 years, was chosen as the AICP's first executive secretary. Hartley, using the teachings of Thomas Chalmers, Joseph Tuckerman, and French philanthropist Joseph Marie, Baron de Gerando, played a key role in establishing the Association, and was instrumental in demonstrating a connection between overcrowding and unsanitary conditions and mortality. Hartley proposed to solve the problem of poverty by encouraging poor people to move to the country; “Escape then from the city . . . for escape is your only recourse against the terrible ills of beggary; and the further you go, the better.” Hartley also exposed the unsanitary practices of the “swill milk” system in a publication called An Historical, Scientific and Practical Essay on Milk as an Article of Human Sustenance. He was the first American to make a sustained argument that milk was the perfect food.

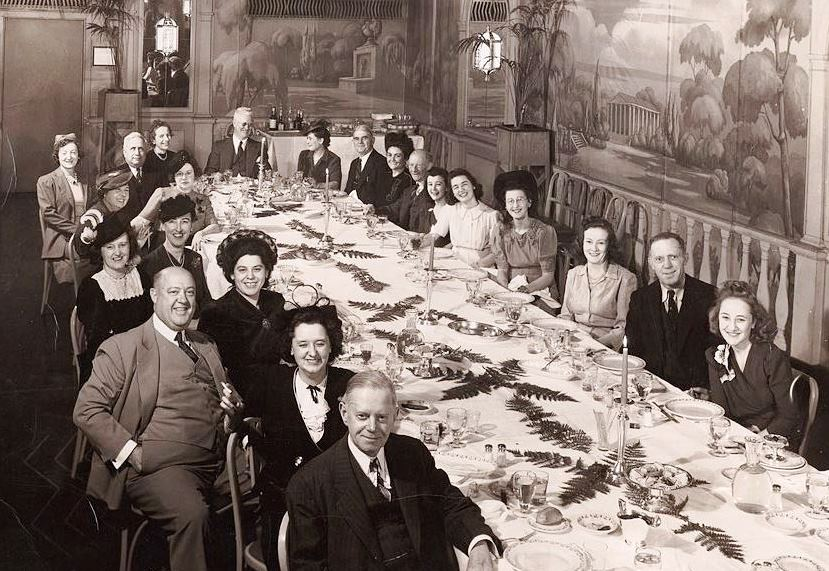
The A.I.C.P. staff Christmas luncheon in 1942

By the early 1850s, the AICP was the most influential charity in New York, and its program was soon imitated in many other American cities. The association stressed character building as a way to end poverty, and took steps to insure that only the "deserving" poor received charity: idlers, malingerers and vagrants were to be sent to workhouses to do hard labor, while the depraved and debased were to be locked up in penitentiaries was a warning to others not to follow their path. Volunteers, usually middle-class Protestant laypersons, worked to get poor people to abstain from alcohol, become more self-disciplined, and acquire the work ethic. At first, the Association employed only male "visitors", but after Hartley's retirement in 1876, it became the first charitable organization to use women for this task as well, beginning in 1879.

The AICP's program to aid New York's indigent children was similar in design to its program for adults: they were characterized by type, and each child was detailed to an appropriate venue – reformatories, school, and placement in good homes – depending on their moral character. The organization was instrumental in putting truancy laws in place to effect this program, empowering the police and other agencies to arrest or detain vagrant children between the ages of five and fourteen for evaluation and placement.

In 1893, the AICP was one of a number of charitable organizations to move their headquarters to the United Charities Building on Fourth Avenue (now Park Avenue South) and 22nd Street, which was built specifically by banker John S. Kennedy to house the Charity Organization Society and other like-minded organizations, to whom Kennedy turned over ownership of the building. From this time on, the AICP merged with the COS in all but name, and in 1939, the two organizations formally combined to form the Community Service Society of New York.

On November 6, 1931, the Peacock Ball was held as a fundraiser for the Association, headed by Ruth Vanderbilt Twombly. 3,000 people attended the event. Guests included notables of stage, screen, and radio, including Rudy Vallée, Marion Harris, and Nick Lucas. It was held in the newly constructed Waldorf-Astoria and broadcast live over WJZ Radio. The following year, the event featured 11 orchestras and over 500 musicians. The Peacock Ball has since been called "the greatest charity event ever held," despite the luxurious event being held during the Great Depression.

== Initiatives ==
As part of its advocacy of sanitary reform, the Association participated in an initiative to construct of public baths in 1852; in 1892; and in 1904, when Elizabeth Milbank Anderson donated funds for the Milbank Memorial Bath on 38th Street. The organization championed the Metropolitan Health Act of 1866 and other legislation which promoted a new sanitary regime in the city, and joined with other reformers in advocating a large park to become the "lungs" of the city, an effort with eventually culminated in the creation of Central Park.

The AICP also sponsored the Working Men's Home for African-American men in 1855, one of the first model tenements in the United States, which was, however, an unsuccessful experiment which did not attract private investors to build more buildings along the same lines. Eventually, after 12 years of losing money, the Home was sold to become a residence for working women.

In 1895, the first community gardens were founded in New York City by a committee of the AICP. The committee promoted the idea of gardening on vacant lots following the success of the first community gardening program in Detroit as a way to address food insecurity and lessen the reliance on charities and taxpayers. The committee also advocated for gardens as a way to develop skills in the hopes that gardeners would relocate to the country. The garden was located in Long Island City on 7,200 city lots donated by William Steinway. Allotments for the roughly 100 families who tended the land ranged from one-quarter of an acre to eight acres. By the end of the first season, the program was deemed a success growing $11,000 worth of produce with a clear profit margin for farmers. In 1898, the AICP published a report about the gardening program as an ideal solution to unemployment and listed similar projects in nineteen cities.

== Notable people ==
Robert Milham Hartley was Secretary and Agent of the Association from the 1840s to the 1870s. Leading social workers who acquired their early training at the AICP included John A. Kingsbury, later on the Commission of Public Charities (1914–1917) and Harry L. Hopkins the future director of President Franklin D. Roosevelt's Works Progress Administration, part of the New Deal.

== Bibliography ==
- Burrows, Edwin G. and Wallace, Mike (1999). Gotham: A History of New York City to 1898. New York: Oxford University Press. ISBN 0-195-11634-8.
- Conkin, Paul K. The uneasy center: Reformed Christianity in antebellum America (University of North Carolina Press, 1995). online
- Cunningham, H., & Innes, J. (eds.). Charity, philanthropy and reform: From the 1690s to 1850 (St. Martin’s, 1998). online
- Lubove, Roy. "The New York Association for Improving the Condition of the Poor: The formative years" New York Historical Society Quarterly, (1959). 43, 307–327.
- Riis, Jacob. How the other half lives: Studies among the tenements of New York (1890) online, a primary source
- Rosenberg, Charles E. Religion and the rise of the American city: The New York City mission movement, 1812–1870. (Cornell University Press, 1971).
- Rosenberg, Charles E. and Carroll S. Rosenberg. “Pietism and the Origins of the American Public Health Movement: A Note on John H. Griscom and Robert M. Hartley.” Journal of the History of Medicine and Allied Sciences, vol. 23, no. 1, 1968, pp. 16–35. online
