= Community Service Society of New York =

American nonprofit organization

The Community Service Society of New York is an independent, 501(c)(3) designated nonprofit organization established in 1939. Originally formed in 1843 as a charity providing direct assistance to the poor, its mission has evolved to include research and advocacy, including voicing their support for underprivileged students as well as offering legal and informational support services for other organizations that work with low-income individuals. It is one of the seven organizations supported by The New York Times' "Neediest Cases Fund".

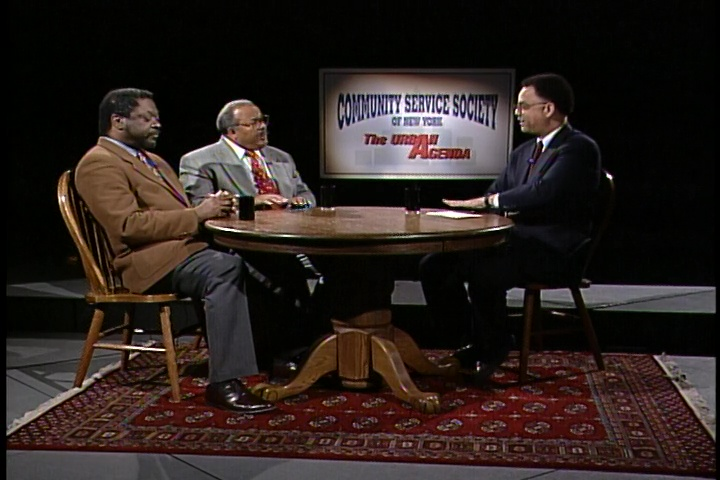
Community Service Society president David R. Jones hosts CUNY TV's Urban Agenda, 1996

David R. Jones is the current president and CEO of the Community Service Society and has led the organization since 1986. Jones also hosted the CUNY TV show Urban Agenda from 1994-2005, the show focused on in-depth discussions of issues that impacted regular New Yorkers. In 2009, future New York State Assemblyman Micah Lasher was a trustee of the Community Service Society of New York.

In 2020 the society received a grant from NY Health Foundation to help enroll New Yorkers in health insurance during the Covid-19 pandemic, along with providing assistance to other groups across New York that were aiding residents with healthcare related issues.
