= Second presidency of Donald Trump =

U.S. presidential administration since 2025

- Inaugural portrait, 2025
- Second presidency of Donald Trump; January 20, 2025 – present
- Vice President: JD Vance
- Cabinet: Full list
- Party: Republican
- Election: 2024
- Seat: White House
- Seal of the President

Donald Trump's second and current tenure as the president of the United States began upon his inauguration as the 47th president on January 20, 2025. Trump, a Republican, previously served as the 45th president from 2017 to 2021. He lost re-election to Democratic nominee Joe Biden in 2020, and then won against Democratic nominee Kamala Harris in 2024. Trump is the second former U.S. president to return to office. (Note: The first was Grover Cleveland, following his victory in the 1892 presidential election.) Alongside Trump's second presidency, the Republican Party also currently holds slim majorities in the House of Representatives and the Senate, thereby attaining an overall federal government trifecta.

During his first hundred days in office, Trump signed 143 executive orders, the most of any president in this period, signed the Laken Riley Act, attempted to restrict birthright citizenship, launched the Department of Government Efficiency with Elon Musk briefly leading it and overseeing mass layoffs of civil servants and closing government agencies such as the Agency for International Development, began mass deportations of immigrants and expanded detentions, imposed tariffs which led to retaliatory tariffs, stock market volatility, and trade wars with Canada and Mexico while escalating the one with China. Trump later signed the One Big Beautiful Bill Act, which permanently extended the tax cuts introduced in the first Trump administration while increasing the deficit by around $3 trillion by 2034, cut Medicaid spending, increased military spending, and increased the funding for Immigration and Customs Enforcement to the single most funded federal law enforcement agency. Trump also ordered deployments of National Guard troops to several US cities to crackdown on various civil unrest, crime, homelessness, and illegal immigration. He also implemented his "Make America Healthy Again" agenda overseen by HHS secretary Robert F. Kennedy Jr. who spread vaccine misinformation and public-health conspiracy theories, and established TrumpRx, a prescription drug website aimed at offering the lowest prices possible.

In international affairs, Trump further pursued an expansionist and aggressive foreign policy, including the greater use of military force. Trump initiated the withdrawal of the U.S. from the World Health Organization, the Paris Climate Accords, and UNESCO. In the Middle East, Trump increased support for Israel in the Gaza war, launched strikes against Houthi targets in Yemen, and carried out strikes on Iranian nuclear sites during the Twelve-Day War against Iran. And in early October 2025, Trump's plan for a Gaza ceasefire deal between Israel and Hamas was signed. Then in February 2026, he launched major strikes on Iran with Israel, with multiple stated rationale including mainly limiting the Iranian nuclear program and regime change, with the quick assassination of the supreme leader of Iran Ali Khamenei, which led to the 2026 Strait of Hormuz crisis and fuel crisis then leading to Trump implementing a naval blockade and economic isolation campaign against Iran. However, in November 2026, Trump announced the cessation of $4 billion in annual U.S. military aid by year's end, though military hardware sales would continue. In the Americas, Trump seeks to implement Donroe Doctrine and expansionism including launching a war on cartels, authorizing a series of strikes on suspected drug traffickers in the Caribbean Sea, imposed a fuel blockade on Cuba, and subsequently ordered a military intervention to overthrow and capture Nicolás Maduro, the disputed president of Venezuela, alleging that the Maduro government had links to narco-terrorist networks and conspired to flood the US with narcotics. In Europe, Trump attempted to end the Russo-Ukrainian war through peace negotiations while seeking friendlier relations with Russia which has been criticized by most US allies. He would meet with Volodymyr Zelenskyy in the Oval Office, meet with Vladimir Putin in Alaska during a summit, held a multilateral meeting on Ukraine in the White House, signed the Sanctioning Russia Act although waiving the sanctions against Russia, and negotiated a United States–Russia oil deal. Trump also sought to annex Greenland leading to the Greenland crisis which ended in an agreement.

The Trump administration has been criticized for its targeting of political opponents and civil society, which have led to the Hands Off, No Kings, and anti-immigration enforcement protests against the Trump administration. Many of his administration's actions have been found by the judiciary to be illegal and unconstitutional, and have been criticized as authoritarian and fascistic through attempts to expand presidential power and conflict with the courts. These actions have also been seen as contributing to democratic backsliding in the United States, as well as severe damage to the country's international standing. Trump, his family, and his administration have faced unprecedented conflicts of interest, self-enrichment, and allegations of corruption. Trump is the first president with a felony conviction, having been convicted in 2024 for falsifying business records to conceal hush money payments. Having taken office at 78 years and seven months old, he is the oldest person to become U.S. president.

== Milestones ==
=== 2024 election ===
2024 Electoral College vote results

Trump, who previously served as the 45th president of the United States from 2017 to 2021 and lost his reelection bid to Joe Biden in the 2020 presidential election, announced his candidacy for the nomination of the Republican Party in the 2024 presidential election on November 15, 2022. In March 2024, Trump secured the Republican nomination. Trump selected Senator JD Vance of Ohio, a former critic of his, as his running mate, and the two were officially nominated at the 2024 Republican National Convention.

Early on November 6, 2024, the day after the election, Trump was projected to have secured the presidency. Trump won the presidential election with 312 electoral votes and 49.8% of the popular vote, while Kamala Harris received 226 electoral votes and 48.3% of the popular vote. Trump, upon taking office, became the second president in U.S. history to serve non-consecutive terms after Grover Cleveland, who was the first president to serve non-consecutive terms from 1885 to 1889 and again from 1893 to 1897, and the first with a felony to serve the presidency after his conviction in May 2024. In the concurrent congressional elections, Republicans secured a government trifecta after retaining their majority in the House of Representatives and winning back control of the Senate for the first time since his first presidency.

=== Transition period and inauguration ===
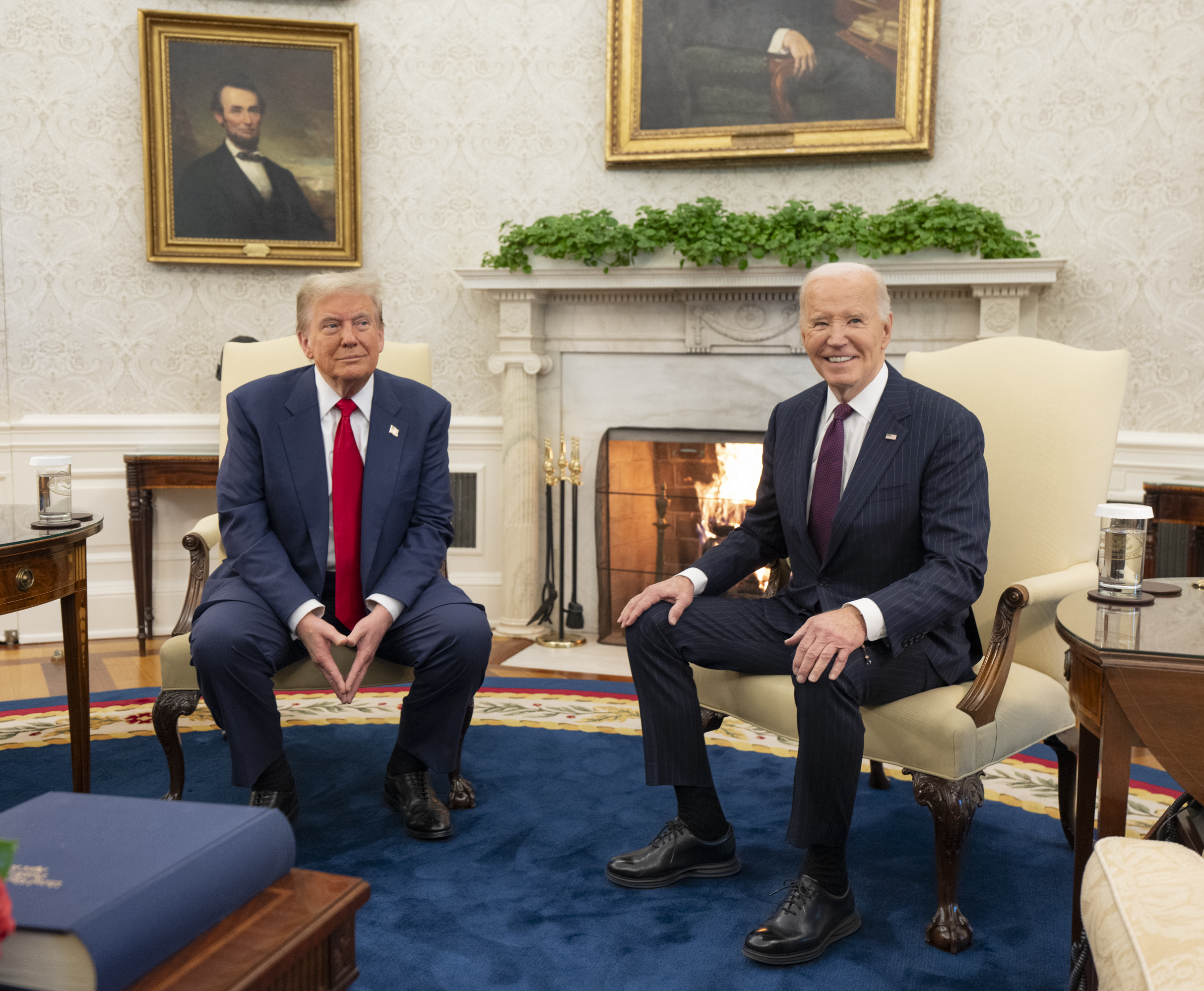
Incumbent president Joe Biden and President-elect Trump in the Oval Office on November 13, 2024

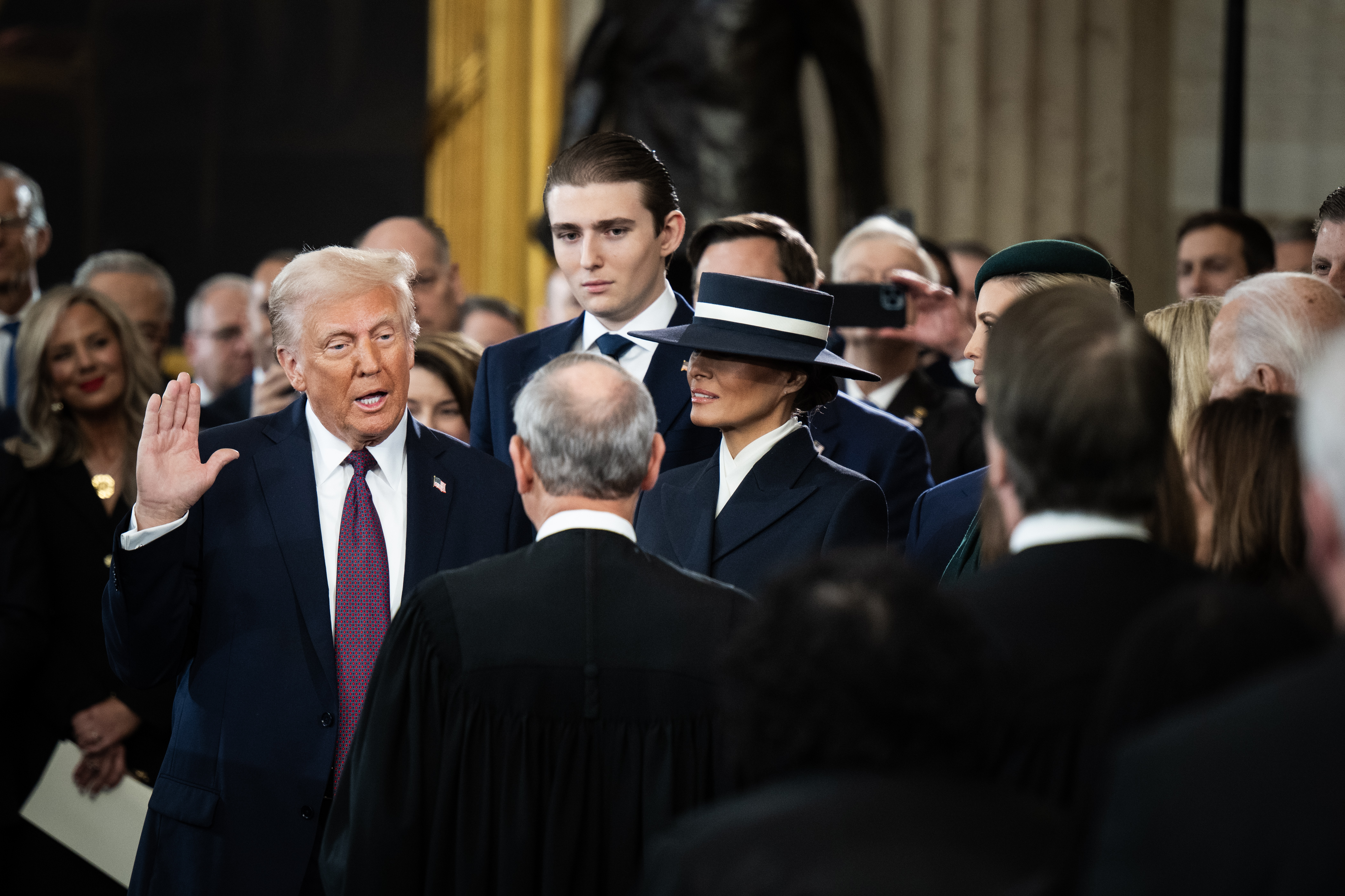
Chief Justice John Roberts administers the presidential oath of office to Trump in the Capitol rotunda, January 20, 2025

The presidential transition period began following Trump's victory in the 2024 U.S. presidential election, though Trump had chosen Linda McMahon and Howard Lutnick to begin planning for the transition in August 2024. According to The New York Times, Trump was "superstitious" and preferred to avoid discussing the presidential transition process until after Election Day. His transition team relied on the work of the America First Policy Institute, rather than the Heritage Foundation, a conservative think tank that garnered controversy during the election for Project 2025, a set of initiatives that would reshape the federal government. By October, he had not participated in the federal presidential transition process, and he had not signed a required ethics pledge, as of November.

During the transition period, Trump announced nominations for his cabinet and administration. Trump was inaugurated on January 20, 2025. He was sworn in by Chief Justice John Roberts. The inauguration occurred indoors in the Capitol Rotunda as a result of a severe cold wave.

=== First 100 days ===
In Trump's first hundred days in office, he signed 143 executive orders, the most of any president in this period, 42 presidential memoranda, 42 presidential proclamations, the Laken Riley Act, a continuing appropriations act, and other pieces of legislation for Congress. Trump's extensive use of executive orders drew a mixed reception from both Republicans and Democrats. Some executive orders tested the limits of executive authority, and others faced immediate legal challenges. Major topics Trump focused on included immigration reform, deportations, applying tariffs on other countries, cutting federal spending, reducing the federal workforce, increasing executive authority, and implementing a non-interventionist foreign policy.

== Administration ==
=== Cabinet ===
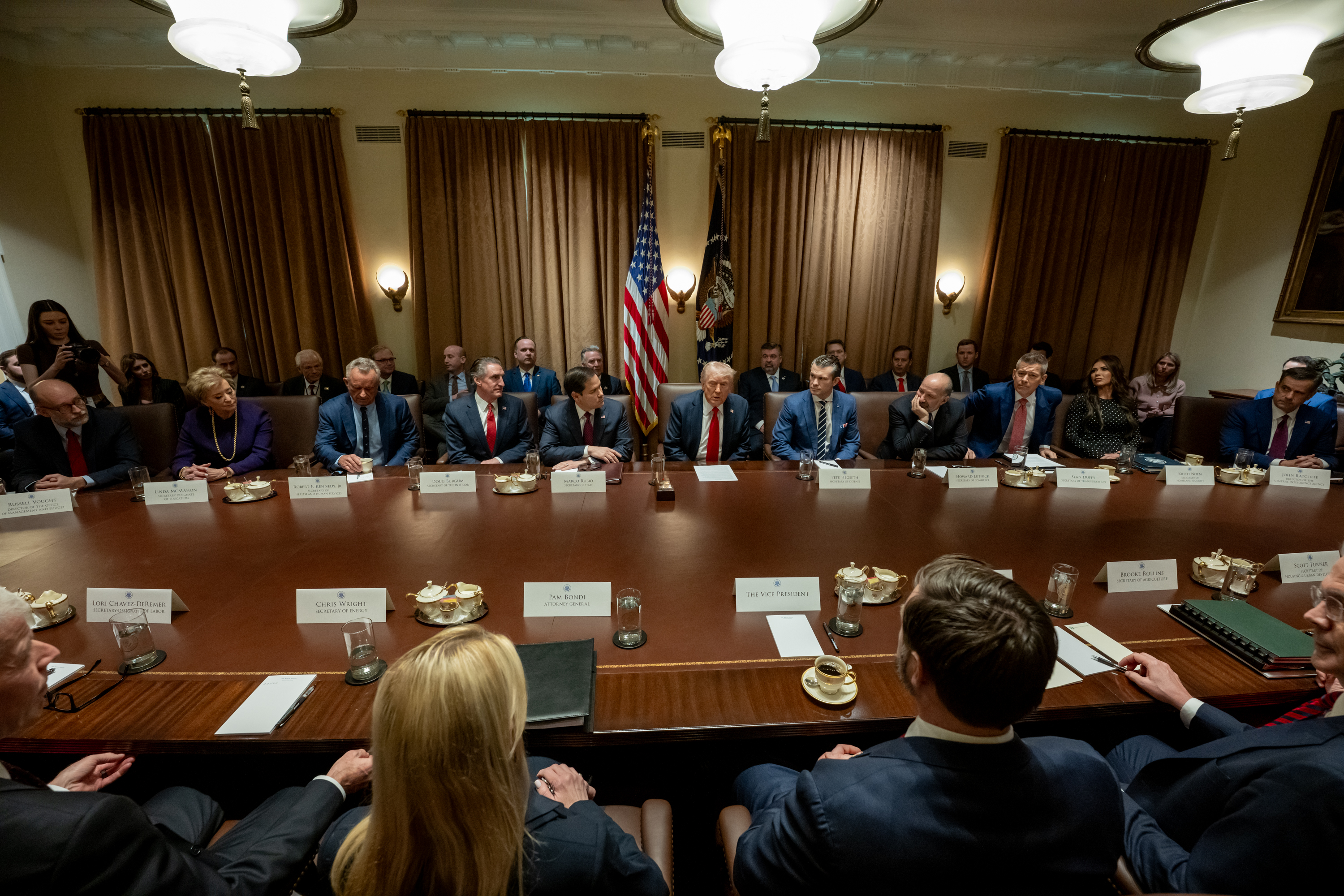
Cabinet meeting in February 2025

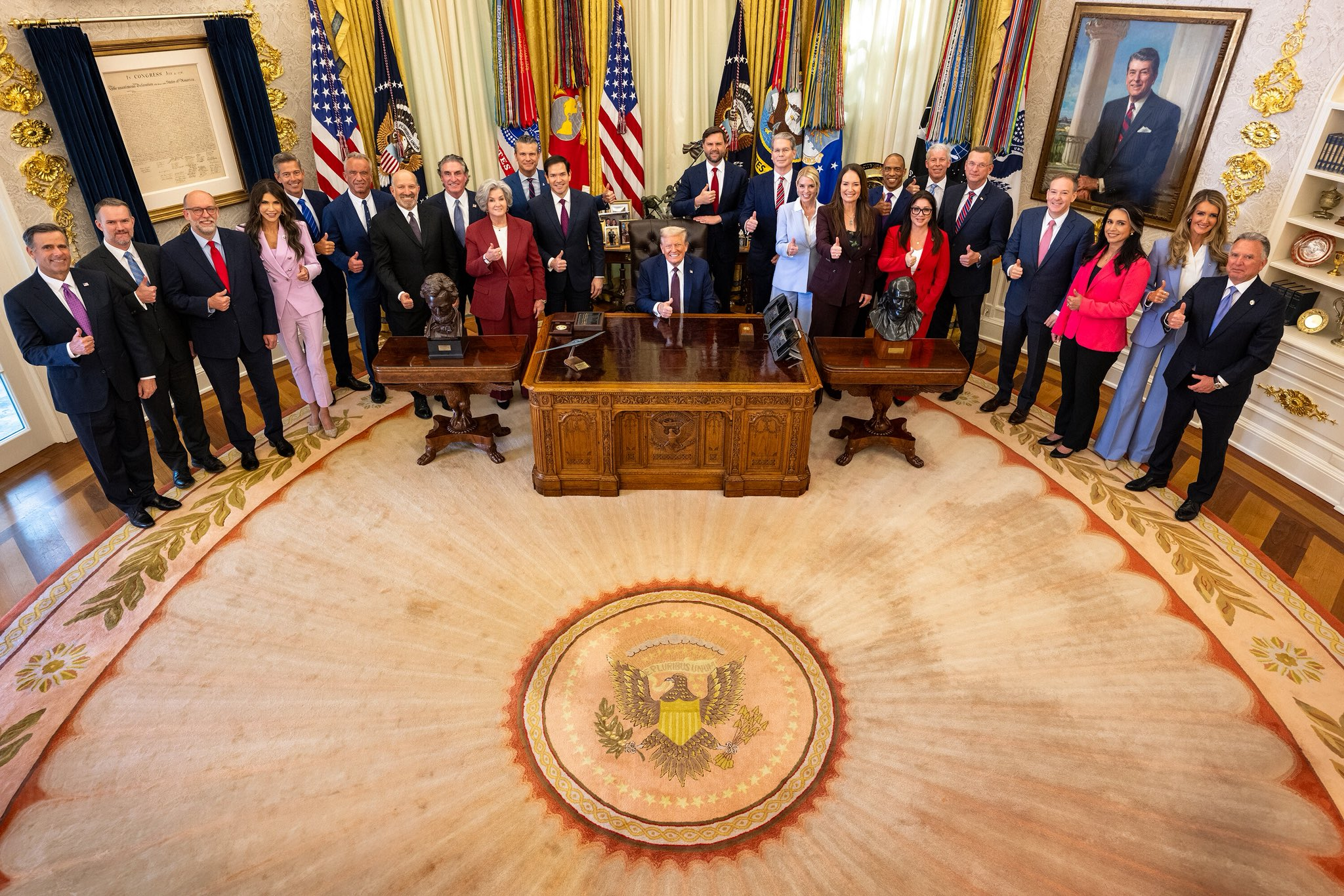

Second Trump cabinet
Office	Name	Term
President	Donald Trump	2025–present
Vice President	JD Vance	2025–present
Secretary of State	Marco Rubio	2025–present
Secretary of the Treasury	Scott Bessent	2025–present
Secretary of Defense	Pete Hegseth	2025–present
Attorney General	Pam Bondi	2025–2026
Todd Blanche	2026–present
Secretary of the Interior	Doug Burgum	2025–present
Secretary of Agriculture	Brooke Rollins	2025–present
Secretary of Commerce	Howard Lutnick	2025–present
Secretary of Labor	Lori Chavez-DeRemer	2025–2026
Keith Sonderling	2026–present
Secretary of Health and Human Services	Robert F. Kennedy Jr.	2025–present
Secretary of Housing and Urban Development	Scott Turner	2025–present
Secretary of Transportation	Sean Duffy	2025–present
Secretary of Energy	Chris Wright	2025–present
Secretary of Education	Linda McMahon	2025–present
Secretary of Veterans Affairs	Doug Collins	2025–present
Secretary of Homeland Security	Kristi Noem	2025–2026
Markwayne Mullin	2026–present
Administrator of the Environmental Protection Agency	Lee Zeldin	2025–present
Director of the Office of Management and Budget	Russell Vought	2025–present
Director of National Intelligence	Tulsi Gabbard	2025–2026
Jay Clayton	2026–present
Director of the Central Intelligence Agency	John Ratcliffe	2025–present
United States Trade Representative	Jamieson Greer	2025–present
Administrator of the Small Business Administration	Kelly Loeffler	2025–present
White House Chief of Staff	Susie Wiles	2025–2026
Stephen Miller	2026–present

Trump's cabinet choices were described by news media as valuing personal loyalty over relevant experience, and for having a range of conflicting ideologies and "eclectic personalities". It was also described as the wealthiest administration in modern history, with over 13 billionaires chosen to take government posts. He nominated or appointed 23 former Fox News employees to his administration. Notably, Trump's nomination of Scott Bessent as Secretary of the Treasury made Bessent the highest ranking openly LGBTQ person to serve in the United States government.

In March 2026, The Wall Street Journal reported that Trump was planning to fire Kristi Noem after a Senate Judiciary Committee hearing during which she was criticised for her actions during her term of office, including her handling of the killings of Renée Good and Alex Pretti, inappropriate relations with her advisor, Corey Lewandowski, and mismanagement of funds. On March 5, Trump announced her reassignment to a new position, "Special Envoy for The Shield of the Americas", and announced Oklahoma senator, Markwayne Mullin as her successor as the secretary of homeland security. Noem is the first Cabinet official to be removed from her post during Trump's second presidency.

=== Loyalty tests ===
Once the second Trump presidency began, White House screening teams fanned out to federal agencies to screen job applicants for their loyalty to the president's agenda. On his first day in office, Trump signed an executive order asserting to restore merit-based federal hiring practices and "dedication to our Constitution". As part of its U.S. federal deferred resignation program, the Trump administration demanded "loyalty" from federal workers. In a break from politically neutral speech, the Justice Department issued memos about "insubordination", "abhorrent conduct" and vowed to pursue opponents of Trump's cost-cutting efforts "to the ends of the Earth" in what was described by current and former law enforcement officials as a campaign of intimidation against agents insufficiently loyal to Trump.

Staffers were dispatched across federal agencies to look for anti-Trump sentiment among government agencies. Some new hires were told to provide examples of what they did to help Trump's 2024 presidential campaign, when their moment of "MAGA revelation" occurred, prove their "enthusiasm", be positively referenced by confirmed loyalists, and provide access to their social media handles. The Associated Press described the intense loyalty tests as a way to separate individuals following traditional Republican orthodoxy from Trump's MAGA ideology. Candidates for top national intelligence and law enforcement positions were given Trump loyalty tests. Candidates were asked to give yes or no responses to whether or not January 6 was an "inside job" and whether or not the 2020 election was "stolen". Those that did not say yes to both answers were not hired.

=== Advisors ===
Trump had assistance from Elon Musk, other political operatives, and an antisemitism task force. Advisors were Christopher Rufo in education; Stephen Miller in domestic policy and immigration; and four co-authors of Project 2025: Russell Vought, Peter Navarro, Paul S. Atkins, and Brendan Carr.

== Executive orders ==
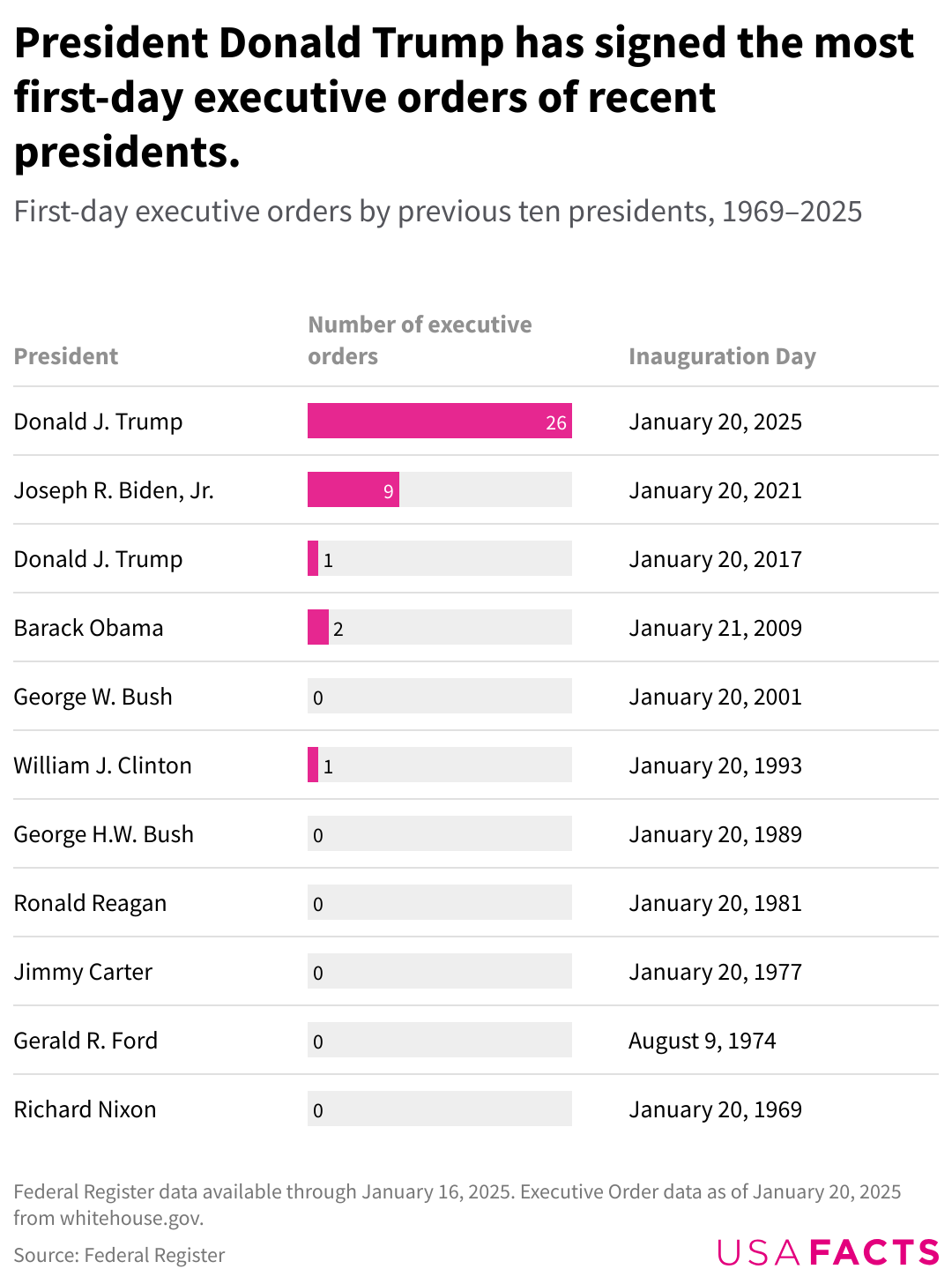
Trump signed the most first-day executive orders of recent presidents. First-day executive orders by previous ten presidents, 1969–2025

Trump began office with the most executive orders ever signed on the first day of a United States presidential term, at 26 executive orders. Trump's signing of executive orders was described as a "shock and awe" campaign that tested the limits of executive authority. Four days into Trump's second term, analysis conducted by Time found that nearly two-thirds of his executive actions "mirror or partially mirror" proposals from Project 2025, which was seconded with analysis from Bloomberg Government.

The signing of many of Trump's executive orders are being challenged in court, with the executive orders affecting federal funding, federal employee status, immigration, federal programs, government data availability, and more. The majority of the early cases were filed in response to executive orders related to the establishment of the Department of Government Efficiency (DOGE), Executive Order 14158, and the actions taken by Elon Musk and the DOGE team towards federal agencies described as cost-cutting measures.

Trump has signed executive orders requiring federal agencies to use specified terminology; these orders are only binding within the executive branch, yet have caused controversy. These renamings include "Gulf of Mexico" to "Gulf of America", "Lake Ontario" to "Lake America", and "artificial intelligence" to "super intelligence".

== Economic issues, trade, and tariffs ==
US unemployment rate since 2025

Change in non-farm employment rate since 2021

=== GDP growth rate ===
In the first quarter of 2025, economic growth was a negative 0.5%. CBS News said the decline occurred because "businesses scrambled to bring in foreign goods ahead of new U.S. tariffs". Second quarter economic growth was 3.8% annualized (as if continuing for the full year). In the third quarter, real GDP grew to 4.3%, the fastest rate in two years.

=== Inflation ===
By May 2026, during the U.S.-Israeli war with Iran, inflation reached its highest level in three years according to government date, and consumer confidence reported by the Consumer Sentiment Index reached record lows.

By October 2026, rising fuel prices had become a concern for Americans and a political issue ahead of the midterm elections. The average price of gasoline had climbed to $4.29 per gallon, up from $2.98 before the war, while diesel rose from $3.76 to $6.35 per gallon. Trump had described higher oil prices as a benefit to American producers, urged retailers to lower gasoline prices, and predicted that oil prices would fall after the midterm elections. His administration also announced a deal to purchase Russian diesel and an $8 billion aid program for farmers.

=== One Big Beautiful Bill Act ===
Trump with Mark Zuckerberg, David Sacks, and Chamath Palihapitiya at a dinner for technology leaders in the State Dining Room of the White House, September 4, 2025

The One Big Beautiful Bill Act (OBBBA) is a key part of the Trump administration's economic agenda. It permanently extends the individual tax rates Trump signed into law in 2017, which were set to expire at the end of 2025. It raises the cap on the state and local tax deduction to $40,000 for taxpayers making less than $500,000, with the cap reverting to $10,000 after five years. It includes several tax deductions for tips, overtime pay, auto loans, and creates Trump accounts, allowing parents to create tax-deferred accounts for the benefit of their children, all set to expire in 2028. It includes a permanent $200 increase in the child tax credit, a 1% tax on remittances, and a tax hike on investment income from college endowments. It phases out some clean energy tax credits that were included in the Biden-era Inflation Reduction Act, and promotes fossil fuels over renewable energy. It increases a tax credit for advanced semiconductor manufacturing and repeals a tax on silencers.

The OBBBA has been criticized for limiting health insurance coverage and resulting in an upwards transfer of wealth. It is expected to add a total of $3 trillion to the national debt of the United States by 2034, according to the Congressional Budget Office.

=== Government shutdown in October–November 2025 ===
Because the Senate could not muster 60 votes per filibuster rules, funding for non-essential services ended October 1, 2025. Throughout October and into November, Senate had 14 votes, all of which failed to reach the 60-vote threshold. The shutdown ended on November 12.

In early October, Senate majority leader John Thune said, "We have a majority of senators – 55 senators have already voted for this clean, short-term, nonpartisan CR," referring to a continuing resolution. Minority Leader Chuck Schumer spoke from the floor of the Senate and said 70% of Americans supported keeping the same money for the Affordable Care Act, informally "Obamacare". In addition, Schumer claimed that a survey by KFF showed that 57% of MAGA supporters also favored keeping the same money for Obamacare.

The governments of 25 states sued the Trump administration regarding SNAP benefits ("food stamps") which were expected to run out on the first day of November. 1 out of 8 Americans rely on these benefits. SNAP stands for "Supplemental Nutrition Assistance Program". The administration says that they are prohibited by law from using the "contingency fund" for normal, operational expenses because this money is purposed for extraordinary events such as Hurricane Melissa. The states suing say this both goes against the wording of the law and is a "dramatic change", pointing out that the contingency fund was used for SNAP benefits during the 2019 shutdown.

On October 31, a federal judge in Rhode Island cited the Administrative Procedure Act and temporarily ordered the Trump administration to continue SNAP funding. A second federal judge in Boston said the Trump administration's plan to stop SNAP funding during the shutdown was against the law, but did not order payments to resume.

On November 7, Justice Ketanji Brown Jackson temporarily froze the lower court order requiring full payment of SNAP. ABC News (United States)|ABC News stated, "at least nine states had already begun issuing SNAP benefits under the direction of the federal agency that operates SNAP," reportedly including California, Wisconsin, Kansas, Pennsylvania, New York, New Jersey, and Vermont.

In early November, Trump called for ending the Senate's rule and tradition of the filibuster. On November 6, some Republican senators talked about making a "clean" Continuing Resolution one of the exceptions to the filibuster rule, but it's estimated that this change is unlikely.

On November 9, the Senate achieved a 60-vote compromise of a "mini-bus" which will fund certain departments through next September and the rest of government through January 30. SNAP would be funded through September 2026. Senate Republicans agreed to have a vote on the Obamacare funding by the 2nd week of December. Eight Democrats voted with Republicans to end the shutdown. On November 12, the House passed the bill, 222 to 209. Trump then signed it into law. CBS News said, "The moderates viewed the deal – after Republicans leaders refused Schumer's offer – as the best possible offer they could secure, arguing that continuing the shutdown would only inflict more pain without any hopes of a better deal." In addition, Senator Tim Kaine (D-Virginia) was won over by a new continuing resolution coming from the White House which reversed the October layoffs.

=== Government funding starting January 30, 2026 ===
On January 8, 2026, the House of Representatives voted 397 - 28 for a three-bill package, known as a "minibus", which House and Senate negotiators had put forward earlier that week.

There was a partial shutdown from January 31 till February 3, 2026. On February 3, the House passed and President Trump signed the Senate version to fund the United States government through September, which the exception of the Department of Homeland Security (DHS) only being funded through February 13. This is the result of disagreement between Democrats and Republicans over how to move forward from the situation in Minneapolis, Minnesota.

In the end, 21 House Democrats had voted for the funding bill and 21 House Republicans had voted against it.

=== DHS partial shutdown starting February 14, 2026 ===
A partial shutdown of the Department of Homeland Security began on Saturday, February 14, 2026. Most of the government employees affected will be expected to keep working, but their paychecks may be delayed depending on the length of the shutdown. This affects the Transportation Security Administration (TSA), Federal Emergency Management Agency (FEMA), Cybersecurity and Infrastructure Security Agency (CISA), U.S. Secret Service, U.S. Coast Guard, and Immigration and Customs Enforcement (ICE).

The disagreement between Republicans and Democrats in Congress pertains most recently to the situation in Minneapolis, Minnesota, and more generally to immigration enforcement policies and actions by the Trump administration.

Democrats are asking for judicial warrants before agents can enter private property, a ban on ICE agents wearing face masks, the mandatory use of body cams, and new laws for use-of-force standards. In fact, both President Trump and Homeland Security Secretary Kristi Noem have spoken in favor of body cams starting in Minneapolis and going nationwide as funding becomes available.

=== Trade and tariffs ===
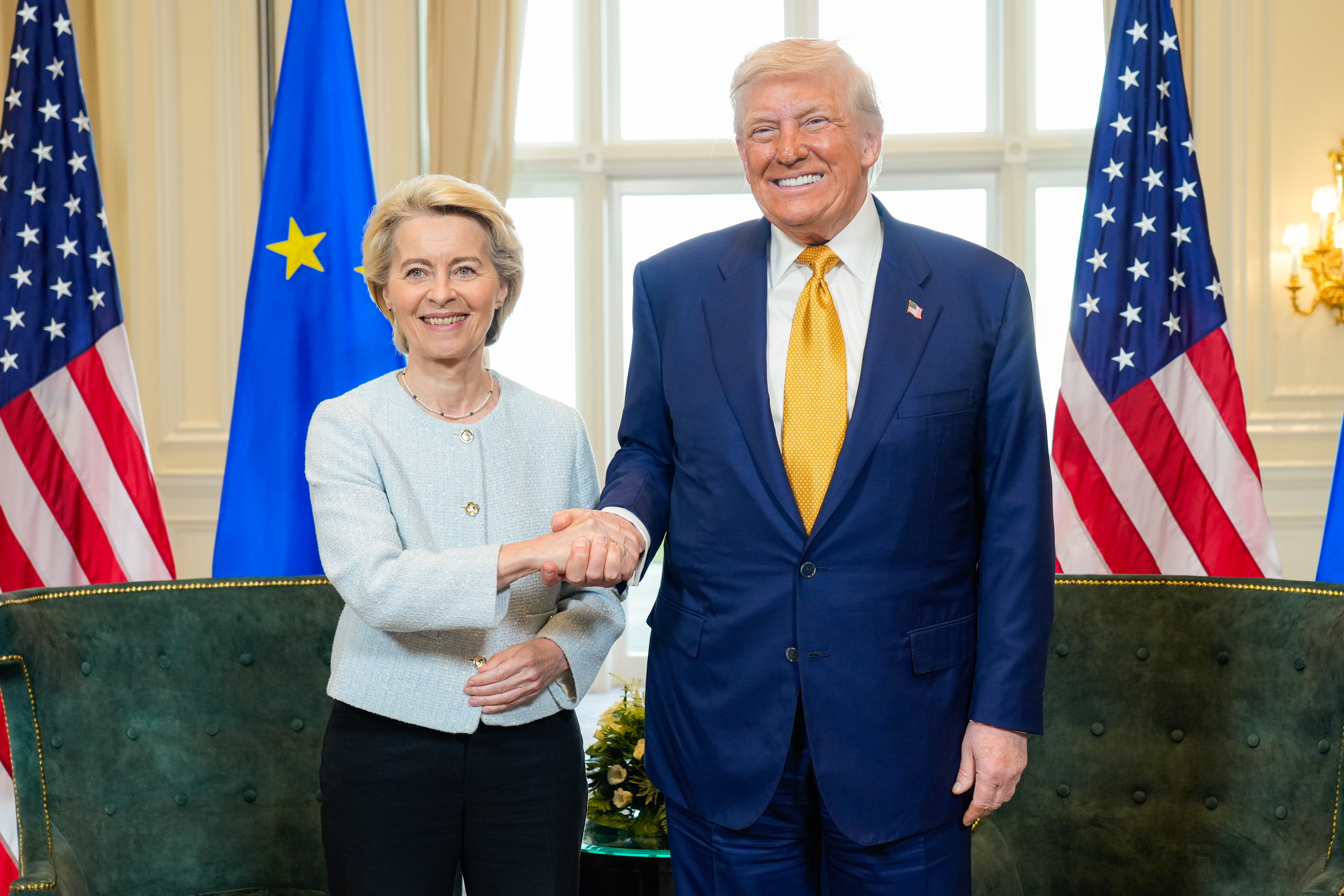
Trump with European Commission president Ursula von der Leyen in Scotland on the day of the signing of the US-EU trade agreement, July 27, 2025

Trump has been a strong proponent of tariffs both during his campaign and as president. Throughout the first 100 days of his presidency, he implemented tariffs on multiple different countries, though mainly China, Mexico, and Canada, leading to retaliation.

On April 2, 2025, a day Trump nicknamed "Liberation Day", he announced a 10% universal import duty on all goods brought into the US (even higher for some trade partners), before ordering a 90-day pause shortly after drops in the market. The Trump administration promised it would achieve 90 trade deals during this period, though only managed to achieve two by the end of the deadline, July 9, as well as ongoing negotiations with China, extending the window until August 1. Trump threatened to raise tariffs on multiple countries after the first deadline was met, including Japan and South Korea.

Upon imposing the highest U.S. tariffs since the Great Depression (called "Liberation Day" in April 2025), Trump claimed that "jobs and factories will come roaring back". However, manufacturing employment declined every month for the rest of the year.

Though Trump claimed in December 2025 that "inflation has stopped", the consumer price index (CPI) began increasing in the months following his April 2025 announcement of tariffs.

Consumer sentiment declined during the early part of Trump's second term. The University of Michigan Index of Consumer Sentiment reached a record low in April 2026.

Trump asserted tariffs on Chinese goods in February and April 2025, igniting a trade war that injected uncertainty as China turned to other sources.

In January 2026, the US dollar reached its lowest point in four years. A lower dollar makes US goods less expensive abroad, but it also makes foreign products more expensive in the US and thus tends to increase inflation.

The price of oil was affected internationally at the outbreak of the 2026 Iran war.

==== Immediate impact on market ====
Tariffs were primarily absorbed by importers by compressing profit margins. Oxford Economics estimated that tariffs contributed about 0.4 percentage points to the 2025 September Consumer price index's annual rate of 3.0%, keeping inflation above the Federal Reserve's target. Corporate earnings were significantly affected, with global companies reporting more than $35 billion in tariff-related costs ahead of the third-quarter earnings season.

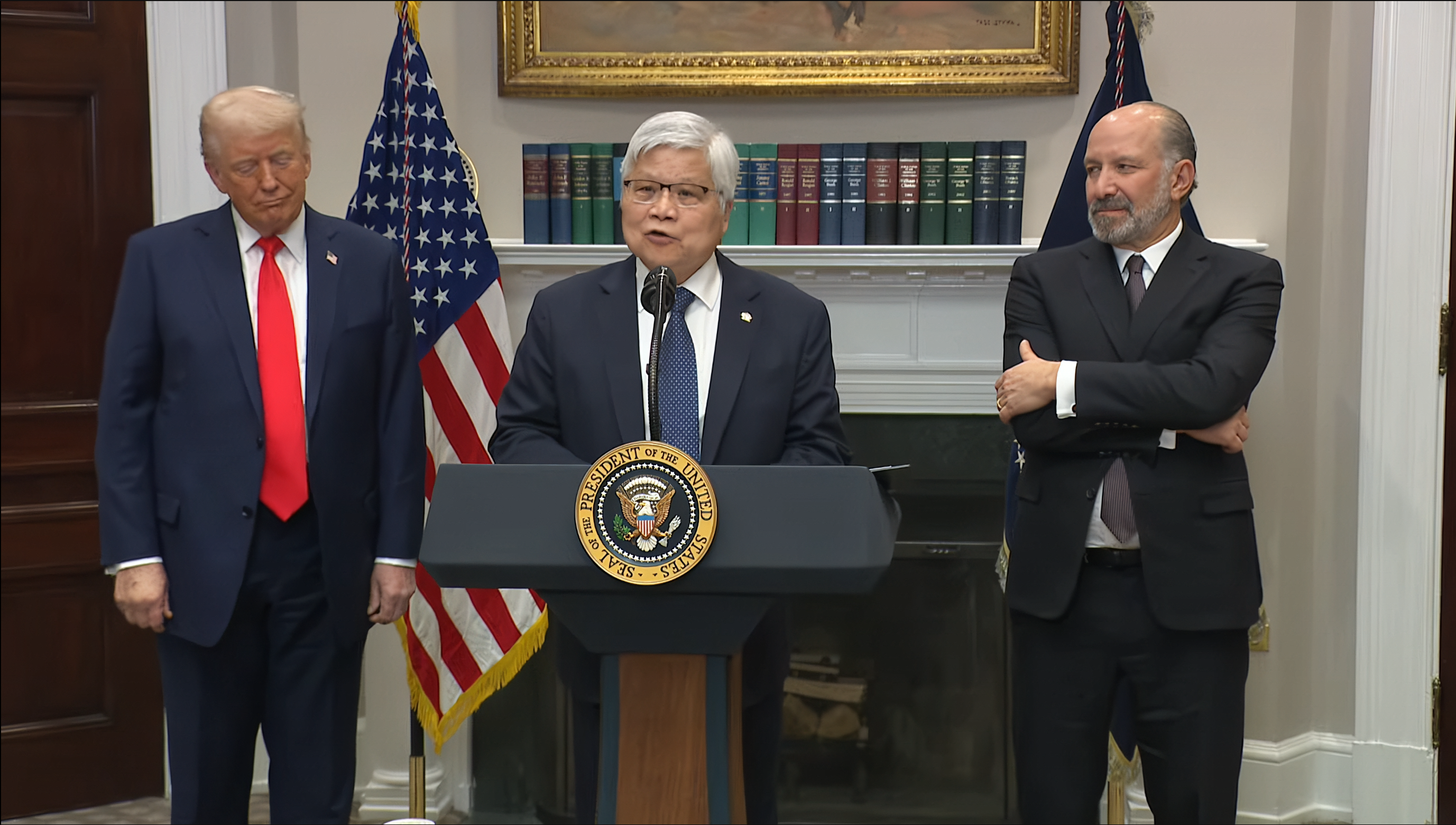
TSMC chairman and CEO C. C. Wei standing next to President Trump and Howard Lutnick, announcing that TSMC is planning to invest in the U.S., March 3, 2025

In August 2026, financial markets reacted sharply to heightened geopolitical tensions after President Trump threatened to bomb Oman over the Strait of Hormuz, a move that coincided with the expiration of a 60-day ceasefire arrangement with Iran. On the first day of trading after these events, major U.S. stock indices posted broad declines: the Dow Jones Industrial Average fell 0.51 percent, the S&P 500 dropped 0.52 percent, and the Nasdaq Composite lost 0.32 percent. Within the initial half-hour of trading, roughly $200 billion in market value had been erased. At the same time, the yield on 30-year Treasury bonds climbed to 5.31 percent—its highest point since June 2007—as investors sought safer assets amid rising geopolitical uncertainty and persistent inflation concerns.

==== Learning Resources, Inc. v. Trump ====
On August 29, 2025, the US Court of Appeals for the Federal Circuit ruled 7-4 that many of the Trump tariffs were invalid. The Appeals Court had ruled that the International Emergency Economic Powers Act (1977), did not grant the broad powers which the Trump administration was claiming. This decision did not affect some specific tariffs, such as steel or aluminum which were increased under other presidential authority.

On February 20, 2026, the Supreme Court decided in Learning Resources, Inc. v. Trump that the IEEPA did not authorise the president to impose tariffs. All tariffs imposed under IEEPA were struck down.

==== China ====
Trump with Chinese leader Xi Jinping during a welcome ceremony in Beijing, May 13, 2026

On May 12, 2025, the United States and China announced that tariffs would be reduced for a period of 90 days. U.S. tariffs on Chinese goods would be reduced from 145% to 30% and Chinese tariffs on U.S. goods would be reduced from 125% to 10%. However, this 30% is still more expensive for consumers in the United States compared to the state of affairs before Trump's initial tariffs.

On August 11, this deal was extended for another 90 days.

==== EU ====
On July 27, 2025, the United States and the European Union concluded a trade agreement, providing for 15% tariffs on European exports. The deal was announced by Trump and President of the European Commission Ursula von der Leyen at Turnberry, Scotland. European states committed to $750 billion in energy purchases and $600 billion in additional investments in the United States.

==== Middle East ====
Trump with Elon Musk and Saudi crown prince Mohammed bin Salman during Trump's visit to the Middle East in May 2025

From May 13 to 16, 2025, Donald Trump undertook a four-day visit to the Middle East, focused primarily on securing business deals and investments in the United States.

=== Proposals for housing affordability ===
In January 2026, Trump proposed several actions and policies to make housing more affordable. These included the banning of "large institutional investors" from buying single-family homes, buying up to $200 billion of mortgage debt in order to reduce mortgage interest rates [already started earlier in the month], making 50-year mortgages available, making portable mortgages available, and allowing homebuyers to use their 401(k)s plans for down payments.

Critics say the housing shortage is the number one reason for higher prices and that addressing this shortage will take a number of state and local actions. Critics also say that making portable mortgages available would give existing homeowners an even bigger advantage over first-time buyers.

Also in January, Trump announced that he had ordered Fannie Mae and Freddie Mac to buy up to $200 billion in mortgage-backed bonds to drive down interest rates for new mortgages. The interest rates have since fallen.

== Domestic policy ==
=== Abortion ===
In January 2025, Trump reinstated the Mexico City Policy ("global gag rule"), which had been rescinded by the Biden administration. Since the 1980s, this rule has been put in place during Republican administrations and rescinded during Democratic administrations.

In May 2025, in a case involving telehealth prescriptions and the abortion-drug Mifepristone, the Trump administration asked the court to dismiss the case, arguing that the states involved did not have standing. This case was Missouri v. FDA brought before federal judge Matthew Kacsmaryk in the Northern District of Texas. The states involved were Missouri, Idaho, and Kansas.

In June 2025, the Centers for Medicare & Medicaid Services ended the rule which required hospitals to provide emergency abortions under the Emergency Medical Treatment and Active Labor Act.

In October 2025, the Food and Drug Administration approved a generic version of the abortion pill Mifepristone, allowing three U.S. companies to produce it and expanding access to medication abortion. The administration has not implemented major new restrictions on medication abortion, although Health and Human Services officials announced a review of mifepristone's safety in response to pressure from opponents.

=== Anti-LGBTQ+ policies ===
During his second presidency, Donald Trump launched a campaign of anti-LGBTQ+ and especially anti-transgender policies that eliminated federal recognition of transgender people, stripped legal protections, and sought to erase trans identities from public life. Through a series of executive orders, the administration defined sex strictly by birth biology, banned trans people from the military, restricted or defunded gender-affirming healthcare, censored research and education materials, and targeted schools, universities, and cultural institutions accused of promoting "gender ideology". Additional measures barred transgender athletes from sports, limited passport access, and fueled international efforts to undermine trans rights. Accompanied by rhetoric portraying transgender people as a societal threat, these policies triggered widespread legal challenges, condemnation from human rights groups, and a surge in emigration and asylum claims by transgender Americans.

=== Environmental and energy policy ===
In May 2025, NOAA/NCEI in the Trump administration indicated that it would no longer assemble the data that forms the basis of this chart. NOAA/NCEI has access to non-public data, so that any private databases would be more limited in scope.

Within hours of his January 2025 inauguration, Trump signed an executive order withdrawing the country from the 2015 Paris Agreement, joining only Iran, Libya and Yemen as the only countries not party to the agreement. The same day, Trump issued Executive Order 14154, "Unleashing American Energy", which included pausing funding for the Inflation Reduction Act, introducing uncertainty as to the energy transition. His administration soon renewed a practice from his first term: removing mentions of climate change across numerous federal government websites that had been reinstated during Joe Biden's intervening term. In February 2025, the administration terminated the Environmental and Climate Justice Block Grant Program. In June 2026, district judge Richard Gergel ruled that the terminations were unlawful and in July 2026 a federal judge ordered the program's remaining $2.8 billion in funds be distributed. In April, Trump dismissed the scientists and experts who compile the National Climate Assessments (NCAs) that are required by Congress, the next assessment having been planned for 2028. The globalchange.gov website—established in 1990 to host legislatively mandated reports such as the NCAs—was taken down altogether at the end of June.

In May 2025, NOAA said that its National Centers for Environmental Information would no longer update its Billion-Dollar Weather and Climate Disasters database beyond 2024, and that its information—going as far back as 1980—would be archived. In July, the chief administrator of the Environmental Protection Agency (EPA) announced rescinding of the 2009 Endangerment Finding, which concluded that planet-warming greenhouse gases pose a threat to public health. (The endangerment finding is the scientific determination that underpins the federal government's legal authority to combat climate change.) In concurrence with the attempt to rollback the endangerment finding, Trump's Department of Energy released an assessment titled A Critical Review of Impacts of Greenhouse Gas Emissions on the U.S. Climate. The report was assembled by five climate science contrarians and was heavily criticized for cherry-picked evidence, falsehoods, and distortions. The Union of Concerned Scientists called it "deeply flawed [and] anti-science". Climate scientist Andrew Dessler called it "a mockery of science". On February 12, 2026, the EPA formally rescinded the Endangerment Finding.

In August 2025, the Bureau of Land Management initiated a review of offshore wind energy regulations and revised its rules to favor fossil fuel production over renewables.

On September 23, 2025, Trump told the United Nations General Assembly that climate change is "the greatest con job ever perpetrated on the world", that scientific predictions "were made by stupid people", and that renewable energy is a "scam".

In October 2025, the Department of Energy cancelled 321 clean energy grants, totaling $7.56 billion, issued in the Biden administration. Trump administration officials stated in a July 2026 court filing that the cancellations were "based solely on the political identity" of the grant recipient's state.

In October 2025, the US used trade and visa threats to sabotage an agreement for cleaner international shipping at the International Maritime Organization.

In December 2025, Russel Vought announced plans to dismantle the National Center for Atmospheric Research.

The Department of Energy issued several emergency orders in 2025 directing coal power plants to continue operating. The cost to ratepayers to maintain and run these aging plants was estimated at $3 billion per year.

On January 7, 2026, Trump announced that the United States would be withdrawing from the 1992 United Nations Framework Convention on Climate Change (UNFCC), the UN's Intergovernmental Panel on Climate Change (IPCC), and 65 other international organizations—alleging the treaties "no longer serve American interests". The next day, Trump's administration announced that the country would be withdrawing from the Green Climate Fund, which since 2010 has provided funds to help poorer nations deal with the effects of climate change.

On January 14, 2026, the EPA revised its regulations on air pollution so as to no longer consider the dollar value of pollution's impact on human health when determining acceptable levels of polluted air for public health.

In June 2026, the Trump administration announced dismantlement of the Ocean Observatories Initiative that includes 900 deep-sea instruments. Since 2016, the project has been monitoring coastal environments, marine ecosystems and currents such as the Atlantic Meridional Overturning Circulation.

==== Nuclear power ====
The Trump administration has sought to drastically expand the US's nuclear power generation, setting a goal to quadruple it by 2050. The administration seeks to revive production at decommissioned plants, such as the plant at Three Mile Island in Pennsylvania. It also seeks to promote the construction of new small modular reactors. The administration considers nuclear power generation a strategic priority because of its potential use in powering data centers needed to compete in the international AI development race. Experts are divided on the feasibility of Trump's nuclear power goals, with many expressing skepticism that they can be reached because of the high cost of nuclear power generation, while others say the conditions for financing nuclear power are relatively favorable. Despite efforts to increase nuclear power generation, data centers have led to steep increases in the cost of power in some communities, prompting local backlash.

=== Domestic deployment of military forces ===
The Trump administration has repeatedly deployed federal forces, including active-duty military personnel and federalised National Guard forces, into certain U.S. cities. Trump has given multiple explanations for the deployments, saying they are part of crackdowns on protests, civil unrest, crime, homelessness, and illegal immigration. The actions targeted Democratic Party-led cities and sparked significant controversy, with critics labeling them as abuses of power and potential violations of laws like the Posse Comitatus Act, which limits military involvement in domestic law enforcement. The moves came amidst broader expansions of the military's domestic use during the second Trump administration, and Trump's prior comments during his presidential campaign to use the military to end civil unrest and protests without consent from state governors and target "the enemy within".

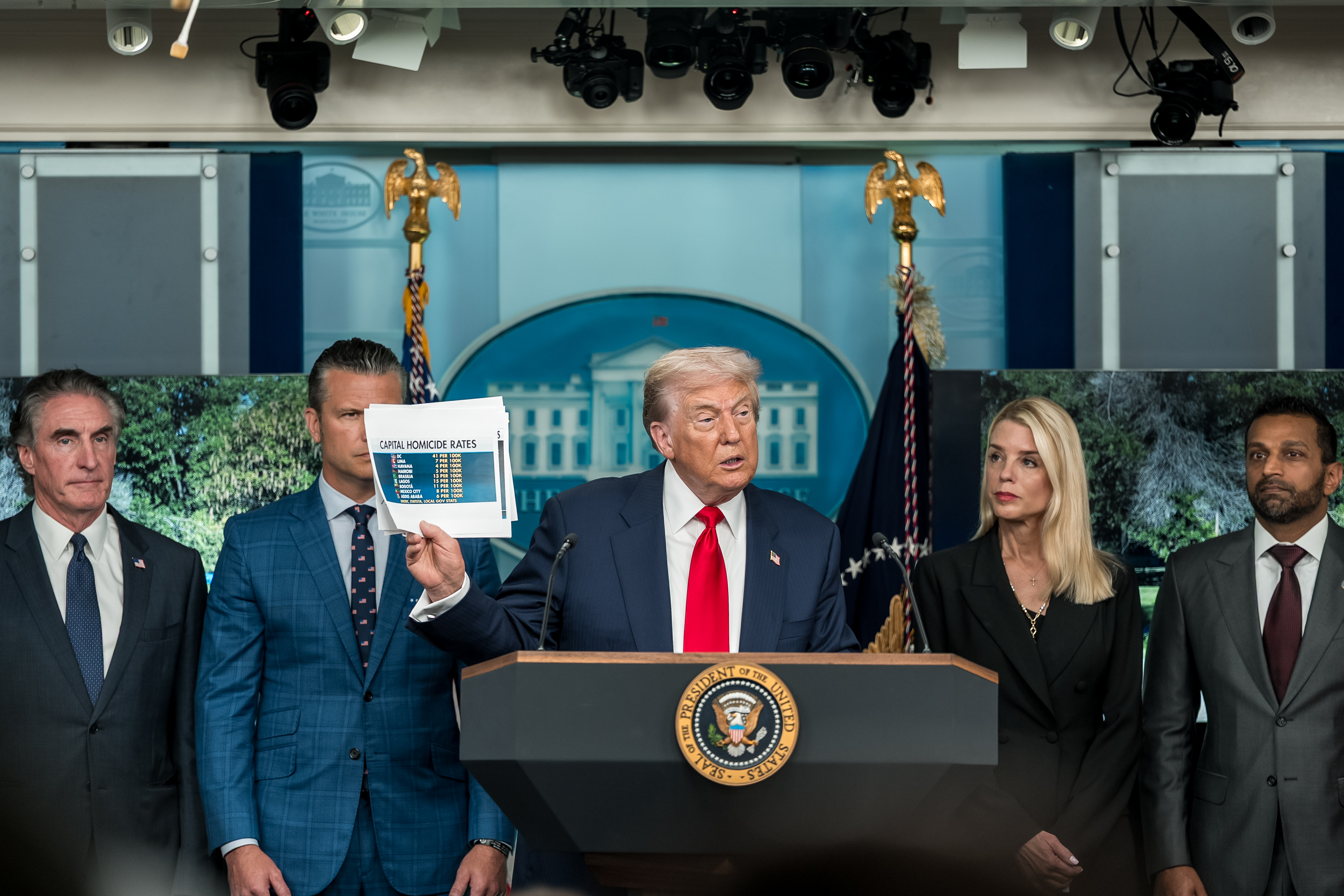
Trump and FBI Director Kash Patel (far right) in a press conference on crime in Washington, D.C., in August 2025

During the June 2025 Los Angeles protests against local immigration raids, Trump federalized the California National Guard and deployed them to Los Angeles along with 700 Marines under Joint Task Force 51.

Declaring a crime emergency in August 2025, the Trump administration deployed 2,000 National Guard soldiers to Washington, D.C.

In September 2025, Trump announced the deployment of 150 unarmed national guardsmen to Memphis, Tennessee, saying that the city "is deeply troubled". Their presence in Memphis started on October 1.

Louisiana governor Jeff Landry requested the deployment of the National Guard for large upcoming events: the Bayou Classic college football event November 27–29, New Year Eve and Day celebrations, and Mardi Gras celebrations in February. The New Orleans police superintendent said, "We are working together and planning their deployment." New Orleans had been the site of the January 1, 2025, terrorism attack in which 14 persons lost their lives and at least 57 persons were injured.

=== FEMA ===
In April, the Federal Emergency Management Agency denied an extension of benefits for areas in Georgia and North Carolina which had been hit by Hurricane Helene in September 2024.

Tornadoes hit parts the state of Mississippi in March and a major disaster declaration by the federal government took more than two months, even at the request of Republican governor Tate Reeves of Mississippi. On May 23, the Trump administration approved disaster aid for areas within 8 states including Mississippi, as well as Nebraska, Iowa, Missouri, Kansas, Arkansas, Oklahoma, and Texas.

=== Health policy ===
Trump and his administration's Make America Healthy Again agenda promoted various anti-science and anti-vaccine claims, which led to a resurgence of whooping cough and measles. They alleged they were working against Big Pharma.

On November 14, Trump announced that he would nominate Robert F. Kennedy Jr. for Health and Human Services Secretary. This was controversial given Kennedy's repeated endorsement of anti-vaccine conspiracy theories. The director of the American Public Health Association, America's largest organization of public health professionals, said, "He is not competent by training, management skills, temperament or trust to have this job."

On February 18, Trump signed an executive order calling for the policy recommendations for reducing the out-of-pocket costs of In vitro fertilisation. On February 25, Trump signed an executive order to improve healthcare cost transparency.

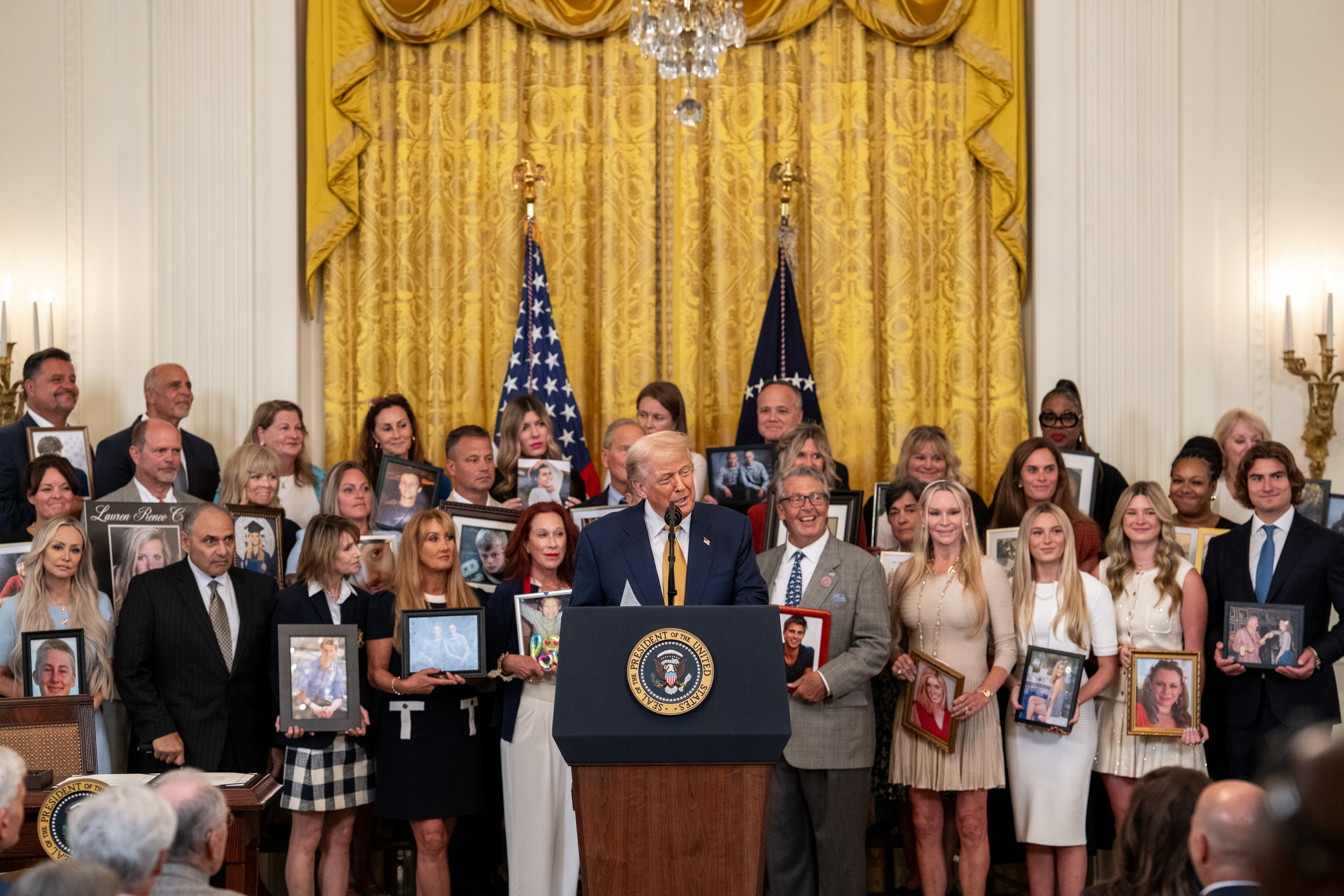
Trump with families of overdose victims after signing the HALT Fentanyl Act, July 16, 2025

By late April, the Trump administration had placed on leave and then temporarily rehired federal employees in the NIOSH, or National Institute of Occupational Safety and Health, who had been involved in monitoring for black lung disease.

On June 9, Kennedy fired all 17 members of the Advisory Committee for Immunization Practices. He claimed that it "has become little more than a rubber stamp for any vaccine". Senator Bill Cassidy, a medical doctor, said "now the fear is that the ACIP will be filled up with people who know nothing about vaccines except suspicion." These firings came before a scheduled June 25 meeting in which the committee was expected to issue new recommendations for vaccines including COVID-19.

In late January, several CDC websites, pages, and datasets related to HIV and STI prevention, and LGBT and youth health became unavailable for viewing.

In mid-February, around 1,300 CDC employees were laid off. In April, it was reported that among the reductions were the elimination of the Freedom of Information Act team, the Division of Violence Prevention, labs involved in testing for antibiotic resistance, and the team responsible for recalls of hazardous infant products. Additional cuts affected the technology branch of the Center for Forecasting and Outbreak Analytics, which was established during the COVID-19 pandemic.

On June 25, 2025, Kennedy announced that the U.S. was stopping its donations to the Gavi vaccine alliance, until Gavi can better demonstrate vaccine safety. The United States had been providing approximately 13 percent of Gavi's budget.

On August 5, 2025, Secretary Kennedy announced that he was stopping 22 vaccine projects using mRNA technology, including Covid, RSV, and bird flu. A critic of this funding halt pointed out that mRNA vaccines have the potential for faster roll-out.

On December 5, 2025, it was no longer systematically recommended for newborns of mothers having never gotten Hepatitis B to get vaccinated against this infection. The memos sparked indignation among most health experts.

On February 24, 2026, more than a dozen U.S. states led by Democratic attorneys general filed a federal lawsuit against the Trump administration and its Department of Health and Human Services, challenging changes to the childhood vaccination schedule that reduced the number of routinely recommended immunisations and shifted some to "shared clinical decision-making".

On August 10, 2026, Trump signed an executive order requiring the vaccine for measles, mumps, and rubella to be split into three separate shots, and recommending that "to the maximum extent feasible, all childhood immunizations should be administered at separate medical visits".

==== 2025 CDC leadership dispute ====
On May 14, 2025, Robert F. Kennedy Jr. stated that lawyer Matthew Buzzelli is acting CDC director, though the CDC web site did not list that name.

Susan Monarez was confirmed as CDC head on July 31, 2025, but on August 27, she was fired. Monarez disputed the legality of the firing, as it had not been carried out by the president, and it had been falsely reported that she had resigned. The president later officially carried out the firing. The firing was due to her refusing to rubber stamp what were expected to be unscientific recommendations from the senior staff vaccine experts, as well as refusing to fire them. The dispute began over demands from Kennedy and his top staff for changing the recommendation for COVID vaccine to persons with higher-risk conditions and senior citizens only. The official recommendation also affects insurance coverage and whether vaccines are available in pharmacies. Senator Bill Cassidy called for the next meeting of the Advisory Committee on Immunization Practices to be postponed. He said, "Serious allegations have been made about the meeting agenda, membership, and lack of scientific process being followed for the now announced September ACIP meeting. These decisions directly impact children's health and the meeting should not occur until significant oversight has been conducted." The next day, the Trump administration announced the selection of Deputy Secretary of Health and Human Services Jim O'Neill as a replacement.

Following news of Monarez's ouster, at least four other CDC senior officials announced their resignations:

- Debra Houry, Chief Medical Officer
- Demetre Daskalakis, Director of the National Center for Immunization and Respiratory Diseases
- Daniel Jernigan, Director of the National Center for Emerging and Zoonotic Infectious Diseases
- Jennifer Layden, Director of the Office of Public Health Data, Surveillance, and Technology, which contains the National Center for Health Statistics

Dozens of CDC employees walked out of headquarters and protested in support of Monarez and the departing officials.

==== Claims about autism ====
On September 22, 2025, Trump and other U.S. Department of Human Service officials delivered speeches issuing a major agenda for combating autism. Warnings were for doctors not to recommend during pregnancy the pain- and fever-reducer acetaminophen, which is commonly used as an ingredient in Tylenol. These warnings were issued in spite of the fact that medical experts have found no link between autism and this ingredient, with autism generally established to be a result of complex neurological factors. Scientific American has reported that fever itself in the second [2nd] trimester is a risk factor for autism, and therefore the claims made by the Trump administration are counter-productive.

Also on September 22, Trump also spoke in favor of and the FDA approved the use of the chemotherapy drug leucovorin to also help alleviate the symptoms of autism. However, the justification for this approval was based on limited evidence. A CBS News contributor said, "Not all children with autism have this defect, so there's a test you can do to assess whether that's what's at play. For those kids, leucovorin has been shown to help, particularly with speech, getting kids to be more verbal than they were before." The National Institute of Health (NIH) was also granted $50 million in funding for 13 projects to help transform autism research through the proposed Autism Data Science Initiative.

Two-thirds of the increase in autism are estimated by an April 2025 Scientific American article to be due to better diagnosis and the desire of parents and schools to get started with early intervention. However, this same article estimates that one-third is due to an actual increase in autism from a variety of factors such as mothers in richer countries being older on average at childbirth, the ability to keep more premature children alive and healthy, and small-particle air pollution during the 3rd trimester which can cause an inflammatory response.

On October 9, 2025, Trump and U.S. secretary of health and human services Robert Kennedy Jr. alleged a link between autism and circumcisions. Kennedy cited a 2015 Danish study to justify this claim. The validity of Kennedy's assertion about circumcisions being linked to autism has also been challenged by scientists and medical experts.

==== Prescription drug prices ====
In December 2025, President Trump announced a deal in which nine major pharmaceutical companies will in 2026 begin offering "Most Favored Nation" pricing to state Medicaid programs. In return, the companies will receive a reduction in tariffs for three years. This announcement brings the total to 14 out of the 17 largest pharmaceutical manufacturers agreeing to this deal, leaving AbbVie, Johnson & Johnson, and Regeneron as the major holdouts. In 2026, the Trump administration plans to start a website named TrumpRx which will not sell drugs directly, but will give patients information and links on pricing. Trump officials said the deal also included more than $150 billion for new investment within the U.S. In addition, several of the companies will be donating pharmaceutical ingredients to the Strategic Active Pharmaceutical Ingredients Reserve.

Senior citizens on Medicare will see lower prices in 2026 from the first negotiated prices going into effect from the Inflation Reduction Act (IRA) signed in 2022 by President Biden. This includes blood thinners such as Eliquis and Xarelto and diabetes drugs such as Jardiance and Januvia. However, a negative feature of the Inflation Adjustment Act is, that since it penalizes year-to-year increases in drug prices, drug companies have responded by setting higher starting prices. One study found that "launch prices" for new drugs became approximately 50% higher over the three-year period from 2022 to 2024 (inclusive), with an expert saying this practice is likely to continue until it receives a policy response.

==== Subsidies for Affordable Care Act ("Obamacare") ====
On January 8, 2026, the House voted 230–196 to extend the higher Biden-era subsidies for another three years. Without this extension, it's estimated that monthly premiums will double for many persons who are signed up for the Affordable Care Act. One House Republican said, "I am voting in favor of this discharge and of this legislation to send it to the Senate, so that the Senate will have the opportunity to put forth a reform package that can pass Congress and become law."

==== Vaccine injury research center ====
In October 2026, Robert F. Kennedy Jr., Secretary of Health and Human Services, launched a novel vaccine injury research center at the National Institutes of Health (NIH), concurrently suggesting reforms to the federal framework for reporting vaccine adverse events and incentivizing doctors to report suspected vaccine injuries. The newly established center is dedicated to comprehensively investigating vaccine-related injuries, a long-standing objective for Kennedy, who has criticized federal scientists for allegedly neglecting to consider potential side effects, including hypotheses linking vaccinations to autism. The NIH has officially disseminated information regarding the initiative via two digital documents, providing a notice to potential investigators that the health department will engage in advanced data collection and analytical efforts to investigate vaccine-related injuries. Despite reservations regarding Kennedy's focus on topics such as autism and the potential effects of mercury and aluminum salts, experts in vaccine development share the recognition that supplementary research into vaccine safety is warranted. Daniel Salmon, Director of the Institute for Vaccine Safety at the Johns Hopkins School of Public Health, remarked that additional research in vaccine safety would be highly beneficial, emphasizing the importance of rigorous science in such endeavors.

=== Immigration ===
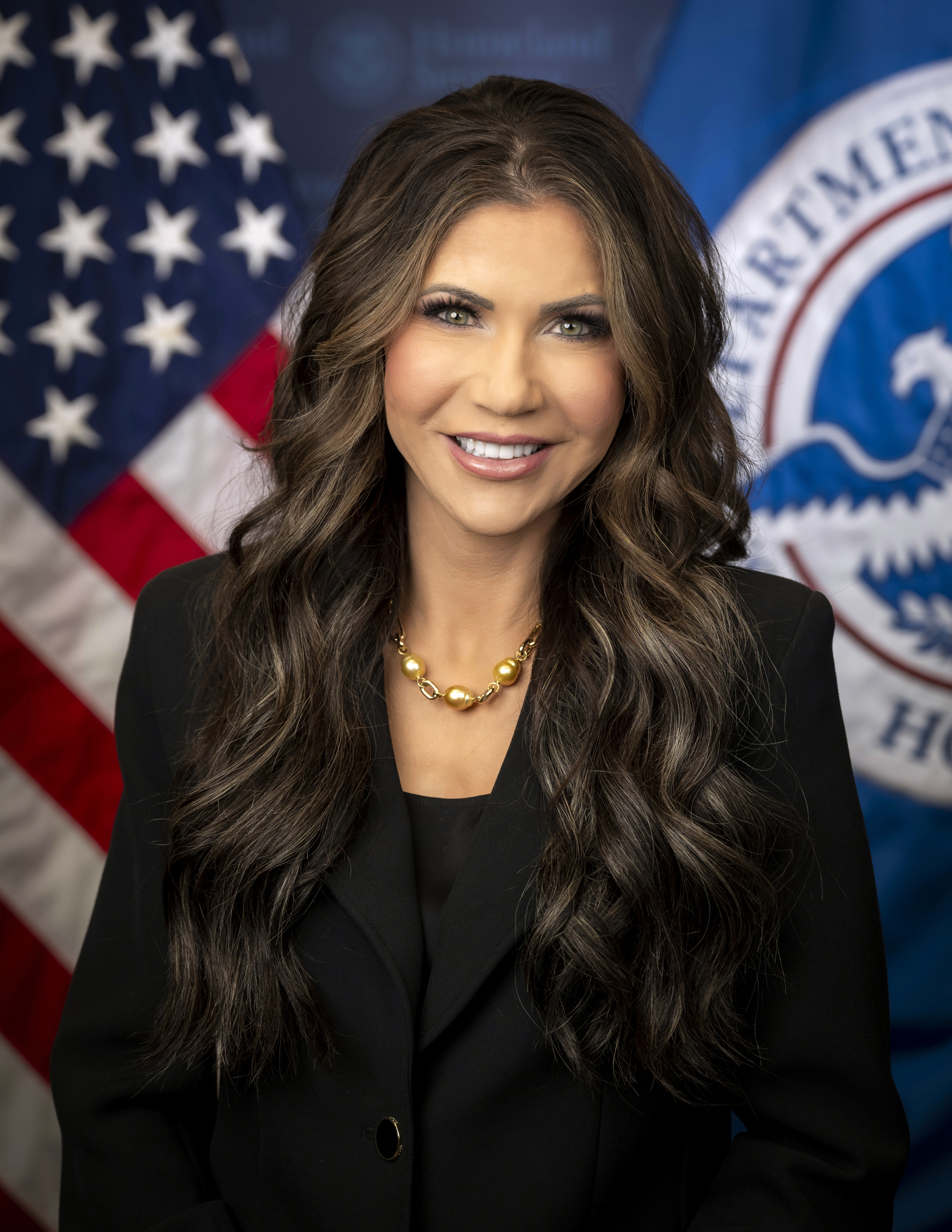
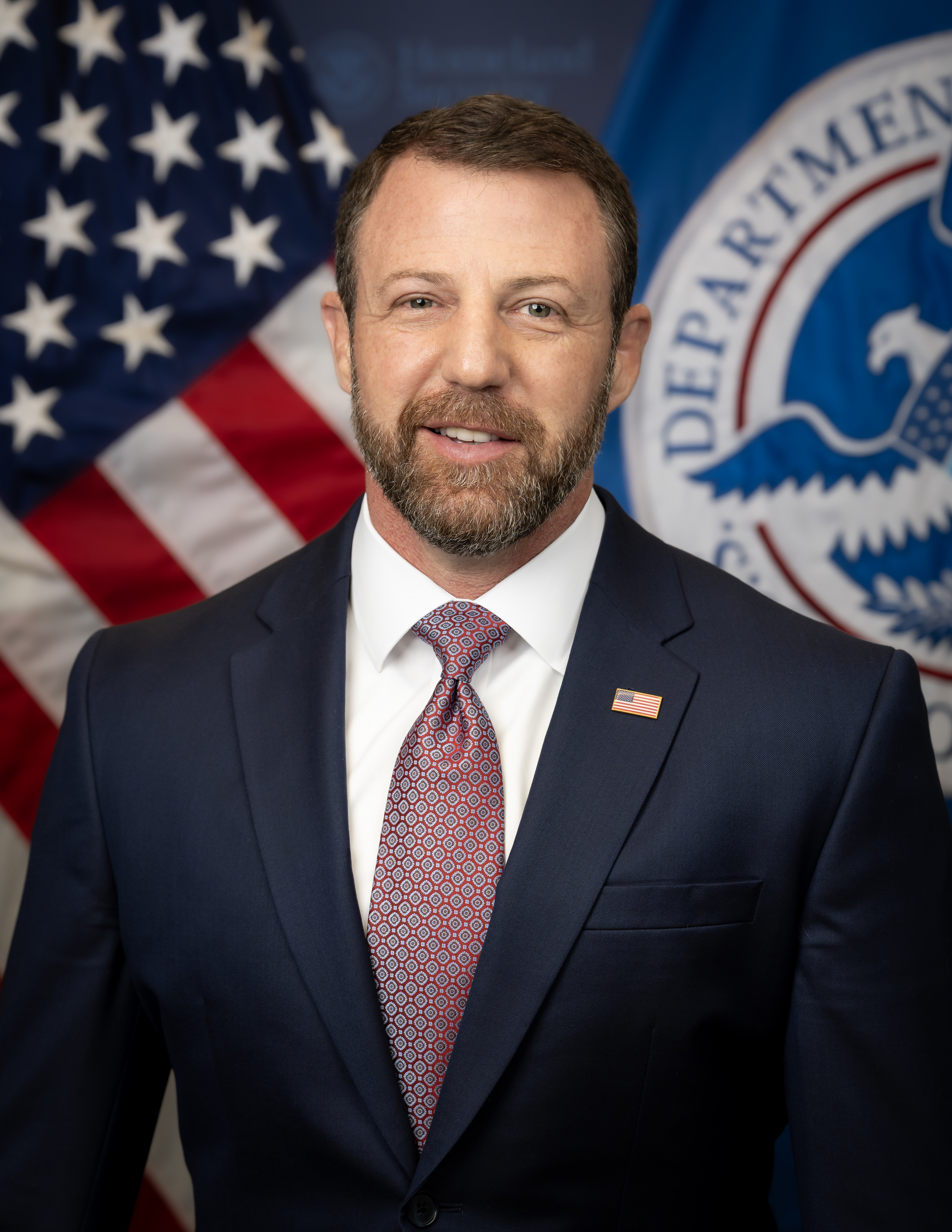
Left: Kristi Noem, the United States secretary of homeland security from January 2025 to March 2026
Right: Markwayne Mullin, the United States secretary of homeland security since March 2026

During Donald Trump's first year back in office, the monthly rate of ICE deportation flights more than doubled, and increased to 79 countries compared with 45 during Joe Biden's final year. Destination countries included many outside the Western hemisphere, some of them to African and Asian countries that had reportedly never received such flights in recent history.

The rate of ICE detentions accelerated during the second Trump administration.

President-elect Trump stated his intentions to revive the immigration policies from his first presidency, including a travel ban on refugees from Iran, Iraq, Libya, Somalia, Sudan, Syria, and Yemen. Other policies included expulsion of asylum seekers by asserting that they carry infectious diseases, deputization of police officers and soldiers to assist in mass deportations, and the establishment of sprawling detention camps. Trump said "there is no price tag" to carry out these deportations. On November 10, 2024, Trump announced that Tom Homan would be "border czar".

While border crossings reached record highs during the first half of the Biden presidency, they fell to lower levels near the end of his term, then dropped even further at the start of Trump's presidency.

Shortly after he became president on January 20, 2025, the Trump administration ended services for the app of CBP One, reinstated the national emergency at the southern border, ordered the armed forces to draft plans for deployment, and began the steps towards labeling Mexican drug cartels as terrorist organizations. Trump increased deportation authorities for the Drug Enforcement Administration, the Bureau of Alcohol, Tobacco, Firearms and Explosives, and the Marshals Service.

He gave ICE the power to deport immigrants who had come to the United States legally under Biden administration programs, and established daily deportation quotas to ICE offices.

Trump also signed an executive order attempting to end birthright citizenship for children of unauthorized immigrants as well as immigrants legally but temporarily present in the United States. At least nine lawsuits have been filed challenging the order on constitutional grounds, and as of February 2025, four federal judges have issued preliminary injunctions blocking its implementation and enforcement nationwide. On June 27, the Supreme Court limited the ability of individual District Judges to issue injunctions against executive actions, meaning to pause executive action. The Supreme Court did not rule on the merits of birthright citizenship. District Judges can still issue injunctions in limited circumstances, such as for persons directly involved in a class action lawsuit.

On January 22, 2025, Trump ended the policy from 2011 which prohibited immigration arrests in sensitive areas such as courthouses, schools, churches, and hospitals, or during funerals and weddings. NPR reported that a "growing number" of Democrat and Republican officials in cities, states, police departments, school districts and other local governments stated they would not assist in migrant raids citing public safety, civil rights, and administrative capability concerns. On January 29, Trump signed the Laken Riley Act into law, the first legislation of his second term. On the same day, he signed a presidential memorandum to begin expansion of the Guantanamo Migrant Operations Center to house up to 30,000 migrants under detention, separate from the high security military prison at Guantanamo Bay.

On February 6, U.S. Border Patrol chief Michael W. Banks claimed that illegal border crossings were already down almost 90% since Trump's inauguration, and that criminal prosecutions of those apprehended were up more than 50%. On February 25, Trump announced that the US would launch "Gold Card" residency permits for wealthy immigrants for a price of US$5 million, with an estimated release near the end of March 2025. Trump deported 37,660 people during his first month in office.

The number of people arrested by ICE increased in the second term of Donald Trump.

US southwest border encounters decreased with Trump's second term.

In response to pressure from the United States, Mexico increased its border enforcement in 2025. Combined with tighter U.S. border restrictions, migrant encounters at the U.S.–Mexico border fell to 237,538 in fiscal year 2025, the lowest level since 1970. Between February and July 2025, total encounters dropped by 93.3% compared with the same period in 2024.

In response to injunctions countering his deportations, Trump considered suspending habeas corpus. Stephen Miller in May 2025 said regarding immigration cases that "habeas corpus can be suspended in a time of invasion", and that the Trump administration was "actively looking at" carrying out such a suspension, depending on "whether the courts do the right thing or not"; Article One of the United States Constitution forbids such a suspension "unless when in cases of rebellion or invasion the public safety may require it".

On July 1, Trump toured a newly built facility in the Florida Everglades nicknamed "Alligator Alcatraz". This facility is designed to keep 3,000 persons in detention. On July 10, the Department of Health and Human Services announced they would be restricting undocumented immigrants from enrolling for Head Start, a federally funded U.S. preschool program.

The administration announced on August 21, 2025, that it would be reviewing all 55 million visa holders in the United States.

In October 2025, the White House set a record-low refugee admissions cap of 7,500 for the 2026 fiscal year, primarily for white Afrikaners from South Africa.

By December 2025, the Department of Homeland Security reported the deportation of over 605,000 individuals, while an additional 1.9 million people voluntarily left the country. This resulted in a net negative immigration flow in 2025, marking the first such occurrence in 50 years. According to Brookings Institution, the net loss of immigrants ranged from 10,000 to 295,000 people.

In January 2026, the U.S. suspended immigrant visa processing for 75 countries, citing concerns over potential financial burdens and a need to reassess immigration procedures to prevent reliance on public welfare.

In February 2026, the Global Entry program that expedites U.S. Customs and Immigration clearance for pre-approved low-risk travelers was suspended to "preserve limited funds and personnel". However, the Trump administration reinstated it on March 11, 2026.

The immigration policies of the second Trump administration have drawn legal challenges from federal courts and Democratic-led states, particularly regarding visa and green card restrictions. The administration encountered two notable setbacks to its immigration agenda when a federal judge halted proposed visa caps and a coalition of Democratic-led states pursued legal action against broader residency restrictions.

On September 14, 2026, a federal judge blocked the administration from imposing fixed time limits on the length of stay for foreign students and journalists without an application for extension. In a separate case, a broad coalition of states filed suit to stop a federal regulation that would permit immigration authorities to deny green cards to immigrants who lawfully use public benefits.

These rulings came shortly before the Department of Homeland Security (DHS) regulation was set to take effect on September 15. Under the proposed limitation, F visas for international students and J visas for cultural exchange programmes in the United States would have been capped at four years. I visas for journalists, which had previously remained valid for years, would have been limited to 240 days.

=== Labor policy ===
==== Worker safety ====
A rule from 2024 had been scheduled to go into effect in Spring of 2025 lowering the allowable silica dust from 100 to 50 micrograms per cubic meter of air averaged over an 8-hour shift, with 50 being the standard already enforced by OSHA in other industries. However, industry lawsuits delayed the rule in April 2025, and the Trump administration did not energetically defend the new standard. In addition, a group of seven Republicans in the U.S. House led by Tim Walberg (MI-5) signed a letter to the Mine Safety and Health Administration saying the new rule ignored cheaper solutions such as job rotation.

In 2018, National Institute for Occupational Safety and Health reported that approximately one in five coal miners with at least 25 years' experience in central Appalachia had black lung disease. However, among 11,000 workers who sought chest X-rays from 2020 to 2025, approximately 55% had some form of black lung.

In April 2026, the administration proposed eliminating the Chemical Safety Board, cutting the Occupational Safety and Health Administration budget by 7.5%, and cutting the Mine Safety and Health Administration budget by 10%.

=== Mass federal layoffs and firings ===
On February 13, Charles Ezell, acting director of the U.S. Office of Personnel Management, signed a directive instructing federal agencies to dismiss probationary employees—generally, federal workers who have held their jobs less than a year, or had been promoted into the excepted service during that time. Ezell told agencies to tell the fired employees that their performance was inadequate, and that they needed to cite no evidence.

As of May 12, 2025, The New York Times tracked more than 58,000 confirmed cuts, more than 76,000 employee buyouts, and more than 149,000 other planned reductions; cuts total 12% of the 2.4 million civilian federal workers. As of July 14, 2025, CNN has tracked more than 128,000 workers laid off or targeted for layoffs. The administration took back some layoffs such as for bird flu and nuclear safety.

In December 2025, the Office of Personnel Management launched the United States Tech Force, a two-year hiring initiative intended to recruit about 1,000 technologists (including AI engineers) for federal technology modernization projects across multiple agencies.

Trump oversaw mass firings of federal workers at various agencies, many of them described as breaking with precedent or federal law and with the intent to replace them with workers more aligned with Trump's agenda. On January 24, 2025, less than a week into Trump's second presidency, he fired 17 independent inspectors general at federal agencies, which appeared to violate federal law that requires advance notice of dismissals to both chambers of congress with reasons given 30 days in advance. Trump also fired all Democratic but not Republican members of the Privacy and Civil Liberties Oversight Board, which would prevent the board from meeting quorum and functioning. Trump also fired members of the Equal Employment Opportunity Commission, National Labor Relations Board and 56 senior officials at USAID for allegedly attempting to thwart his priorities.

=== National security ===
==== Counterterrorism policies ====
===== National Security Presidential Memorandum-7 =====
National Security Presidential Memorandum–7 (NSPM-7), which designates the anti-fascist movement antifa as a domestic terrorist organization, has been described as "Trump's new legal weapon for prosecuting protestors".

Trump issued NSPM-7 (National Security Presidential Memorandum-7) on September 25, 2025, directing a government-wide strategy to counter what it characterizes as organized domestic terrorism and political violence. The memorandum cites "common threads" such as "anti-Americanism", "anti-capitalism", "anti-Christianity", support for 'overthrowing' the United States Government, and extremism related to migration, race, and gender. It assigns the National Joint Terrorism Task Force to lead investigations, directs the United States Department of Justice to prioritize prosecutions and consider domestic terrorist organization designations, and instructs the Department of the Treasury and the Internal Revenue Service to disrupt financial networks, while noting that the directive creates no enforceable rights. Thirty-one members of Congress later warned in a letter that NSPM-7 raises constitutional and civil-liberties concerns if used to target political dissent or ideological speech.

==== Punishing states with cuts to Homeland Security funding ====
The U.S. Department of Homeland Security and the Federal Emergency Management Agency (FEMA) reduced more than $233 million from Connecticut, Delaware, Massachusetts, Minnesota, New York, Rhode Island, Vermont, and Washington state because they had failed to cooperate with Trump immigration policy. In addition, funding was cut to the District of Columbia.

In December, a federal judge ruled that the Trump administration could not do this, stating in her decision, "To hold hostage funding for programs like these based solely on what appear to be defendants' political whims is unconscionable and, at least here, unlawful."

=== Social Security ===
On March 18, 2025, the Social Security Administration announced they would be implementing tighter identity requirements starting March 31, with this date pushed forward to April 14. The new policy requires takes away the telephone option and requires individuals to either apply online or appear in-person at a field office. Applications for SSDI, Medicare, or SSI are exempted from this in-person requirement, along with applicants subject to extreme situations "such as terminal cases or prisoner pre-release scenarios". This new policy comes at a time the Trump administration is closing some field offices and laying off some Social Security staff.

In late March, Wired reported that DOGE was putting together a team to migrate the Social Security base code from COBOL to a more modern programming language, with the goal of achieving this in a matter of months, whereas most experts say it should take several years to do and test this safely.

It was reported in mid-April that the Trump administration had placed on the "Death Master File", renamed the "Ineligible Master File", more than 6,000 persons who are legal immigrants whom officials claim are either on a terrorism watch list or have an FBI criminal record. The White House, however, did not provide evidence for this claim.

Social Security will "clawback" money from a disabled or retired person's monthly payments in cases in which overpayments are discovered. Overpayments can either be the fault of Social Security or of the recipient, for example, a person on SSDI disability not reporting monthly work income over a certain threshold. The Biden administration had capped the clawback rate at 10%, but this expired on March 27, 2025, reverting to 100%. On April 25, the Trump administration reduced this clawback rate to 50%.

=== Universities ===
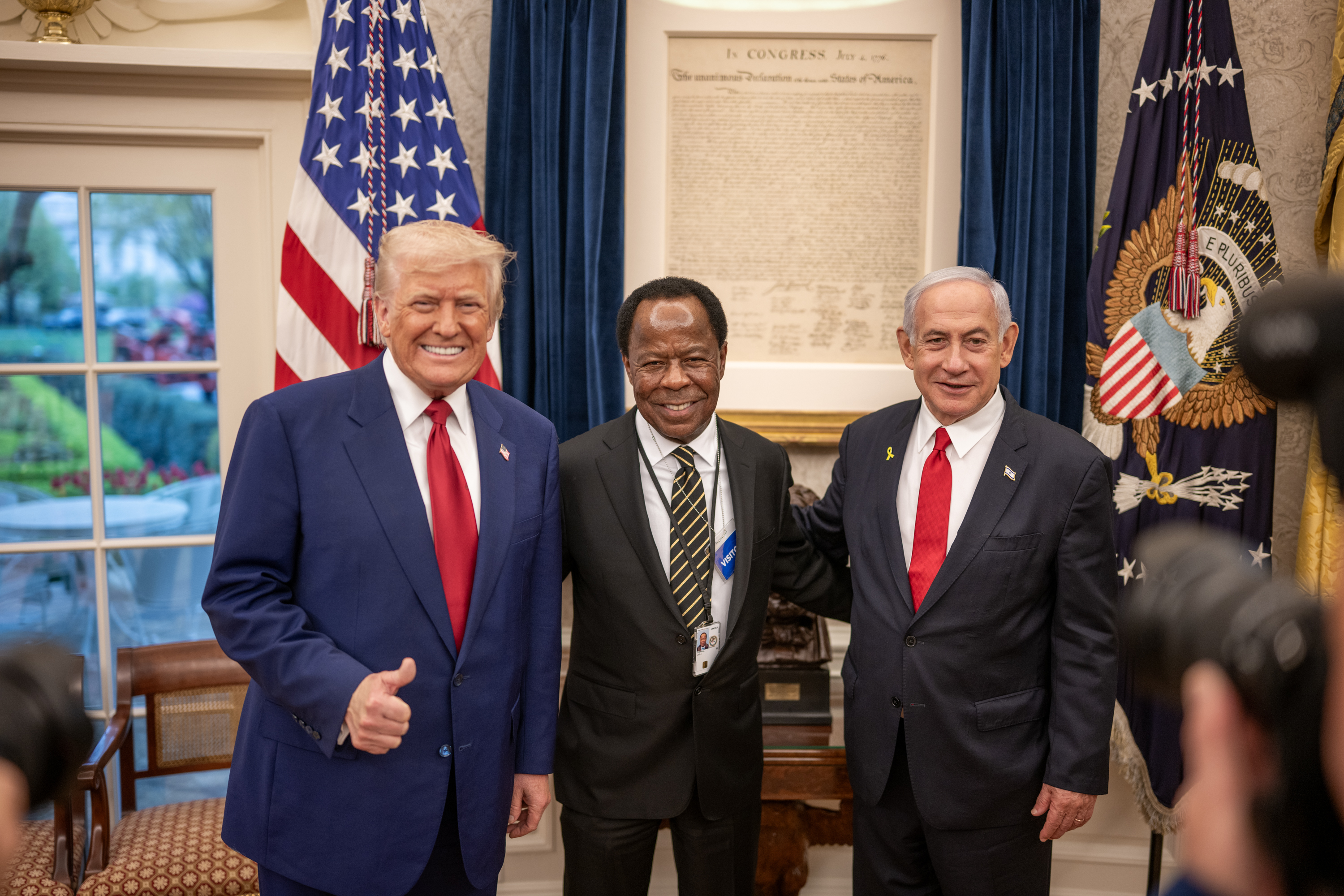
Leo Terrell, the head of the Trump administration's Task Force to Combat Antisemitism, with Donald Trump and Israeli prime minister Benjamin Netanyahu at the White House, April 7, 2025

In February 2025, Leo Terrell, the chair of the Department of Justice's Task Force to Combat Antisemitism, announced that he would investigate Columbia University, Harvard University, George Washington University, Johns Hopkins University, New York University, Northwestern University, University of California, Berkeley, University of California, Los Angeles, the University of Minnesota, and the University of Southern California as part of the Department of Justice's broader investigation into antisemitism on college campuses.

Trump's actions targeting higher education were described as part of an intimidation campaign against institutions viewed as hostile to his political views. He targeted higher education by demanding it give federal oversight of curriculum and targeted activists, legal immigrants, tourists, and students with visas who expressed criticism of his policies or engaged in pro-Palestinian advocacy. Trump froze billions of dollars in federal funding for multiple universities in express defiance of existing laws prohibiting such actions without following proper legal processes that did not happen. The deals and demands made by Trump were criticized as coercive, a shakedown, and legalized extortion in what Axios described as pursuit of a "cultural crackdown". On September 3, Judge Allison D. Burroughs found Trump's efforts to freeze billions of dollars of funding for Harvard illegal, writing that the government had infringed upon Harvard's free speech rights and that it was "difficult to conclude anything other than that defendants used antisemitism as a smokescreen for a targeted, ideologically-motivated assault on this country's premier universities".

== Foreign policy ==
Asked: Are there limits on your global power?

Yeah, there is one thing. My own morality. My own mind. It's the only thing that can stop me. I don't need international law. I'm not looking to hurt people.

— Donald Trump, January 7, 2026

New York Times White House correspondents wrote that "Mr. Trump's assessment... was the most blunt acknowledgment yet of his worldview. At its core is the concept that national strength, rather than laws, treaties and conventions, should be the deciding factor as powers collide."

A 2025 Pew Research Center study found that more than half in 19 of 24 countries surveyed, said they lack confidence in Trump's leadership of world affairs, with views about Trump differing sharply along ideological and partisan lines.

Among 24 surveyed countries, Trump's 2025 ratings trailed those of Joe Biden's 2024 ratings by an average of twelve percentage points in world affairs, though Trump fared better among right-wing populist parties in Europe.

A 2026 survey of European respondents showed net negative views of Trump concerning world affairs.

As of July 2026, Trump has made 12 international trips to 17 different countries during his second presidency.

Trump's second term foreign policy has been described as a mixture of both imperialist and expansionist policies. He engaged in a realist and isolationist "America First" foreign policy agenda. His administration favored hard power to achieve foreign policy goals, and dismantled or withdrew support from domestic and international organizations dedicated to advancing American soft power. The moves were described as ceding American global influence and creating a void filled by Russia and China.

His relations with allies were transactional and ranged from indifference to hostility, and he threatened them with economic tariffs or annexation. He was described as taking the side of Russia in the Russian invasion of Ukraine, and overseeing a rupture of the post-1945 rules-based liberal international order and abandonment of multilateralism.

Michael Klare wrote that containing the influence of China and preventing the rise of any rival power is the central foreign policy objective of the administration. Trump has attempted to deepen the U.S.-India partnership.

Trump's administration saw large drops in global public opinion of the U.S. Countries like Canada, Germany, the U.K., Denmark, and Finland warned their citizens about traveling to the U.S.

=== Americas ===
Trump's second presidency has been characterized by a renewed American interference in the internal affairs of Latin American nations. These efforts have included both threats and promises made to influence the outcomes of elections in Honduras, Chile and Argentina, as well as tariff threats against Brazil and Mexico and military action against Venezuela.

==== Argentina ====
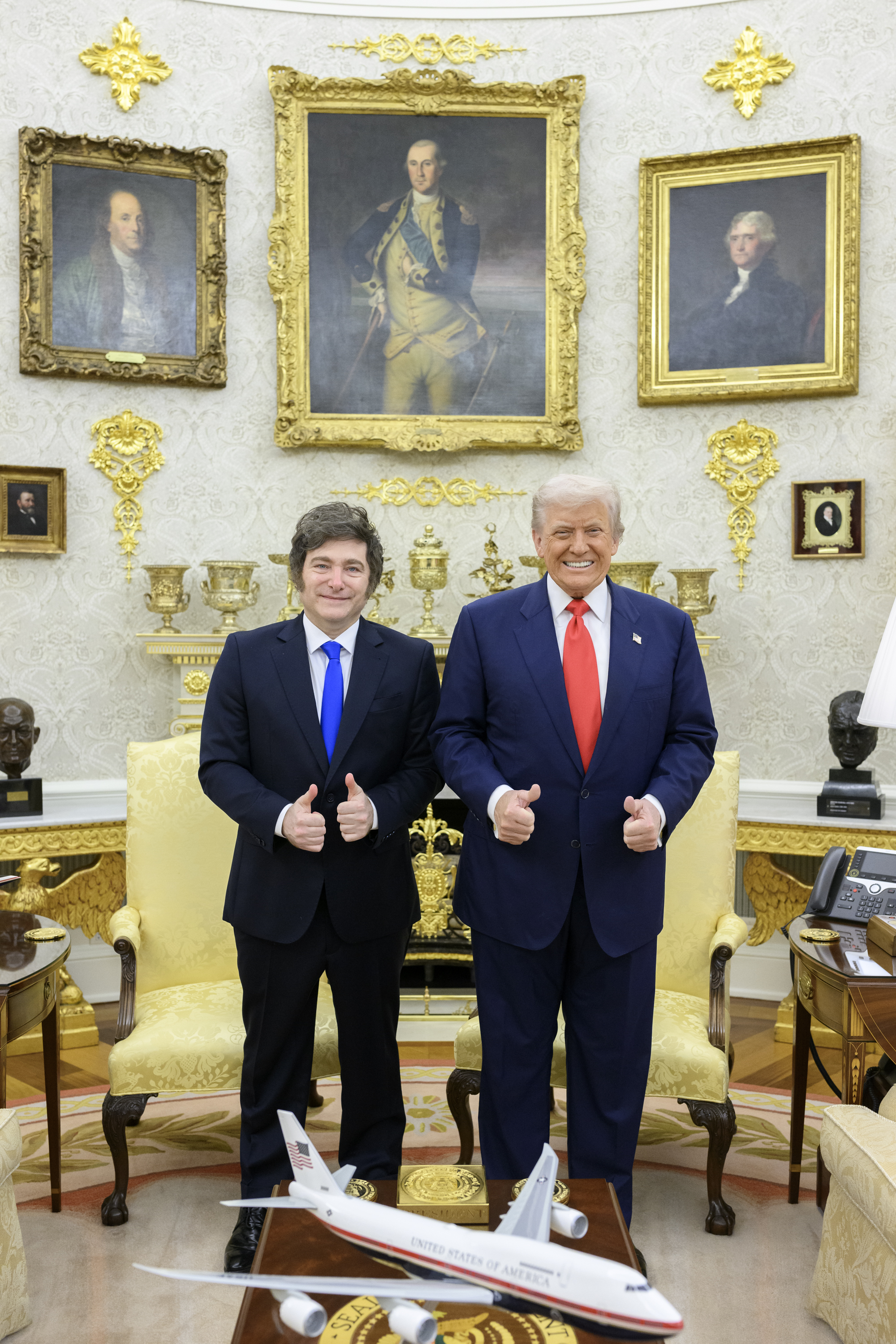
Trump with Argentina president Javier Milei on October 14, 2025

On October 20, the United States and Argentina agreed to a currency swap for up to $20 billion. About President Javier Milei of Argentina and his upcoming October 26 mid-term elections, President Trump said, "If he loses, we are not going to be generous with Argentina."

The Trump administration also announced plans to increase beef imports from Argentina. The National Cattlemen's Beef Association objected to this plan with their leader saying, "If President Trump is truly an ally of America's cattle producers, we call on him to abandon this effort to manipulate markets." On October 22, Trump posted on social media that American ranchers need to help get beef prices down, and said that ranchers "don't understand that the only reason they are doing so well, for the first time in decades, is because I put Tariffs on cattle coming into the United States, including a 50% Tariff on Brazil".

==== Boat strikes ====
At Trump's direction, the United States has executed a series of airstrikes in the Caribbean Sea on vessels alleged to be smuggling illegal drugs. As of January 4, 2026, a total of 35 strikes have been conducted, in which 115 individuals have been killed and 2 have been rescued after surviving the strikes. Since the first strike, which was conducted on September 2, 2025, and killed eleven people, the Trump Administration has invoked combatting "terrorism" conducted by drug cartels as a justification for the strikes.

Many legal experts have argued that the strikes constitute illegal extrajudicial killings under both U.S. and international law, noting that drug smuggling is generally considered to be a crime, not an act of war, and that the military is categorically prohibited from targeting civilians, even suspected criminals, unless facing a threat of imminent harm. Conservative lawyer and commentator Andrew C. McCarthy, writing in National Review, called the strikes "lawless" and "not legitimate under the law". The U.S. Department of Justice's Office of Legal Counsel defended the strikes in a memo that has not been released to the public, endorsing President Trump's claim that the United States is an armed conflict with Latin American drug cartels and arguing that the destruction of drug boats eliminates a source of revenue that could be used to purchase weapons for attacks against the United States.

On November 27, The Washington Post published an article alleging that Secretary of Defense Pete Hegseth had ordered the officers responsible for the first airstrike on September 2, 2025, to "kill everyone" on board, prompting Admiral Frank M. Bradley to order a second strike to kill the two survivors of the initial strike, who were clinging to the wreckage of the boat that had been by the initial strike. As no quarter orders are forbidden under the Law of war, the second September 2 strike was widely criticized as constituting a war crime even under the Trump Administration's justification for the boat strike campaign in general, with the chair of the United States Senate Committee on Armed Services, Republican Senator Roger Wicker, along with ranking member Jack Reed, promising "vigorous oversight to determine the facts related to these circumstances". According to The New York Times, five U.S. officials stated that while Hegseth did, on September 2, order the killing of all individuals aboard the alleged drug boat, he did not specifically address what was to be done if any individuals survived the initial strike and was not present when Bradley carried out the second strike. After Hegseth refused to release a video of the second strike to Congress, the United States Senate placed a provision in the 2026 National Defense Authorization Act holding back a quarter of Hegseth's travel budget until he showed the video to lawmakers.

==== Venezuela ====
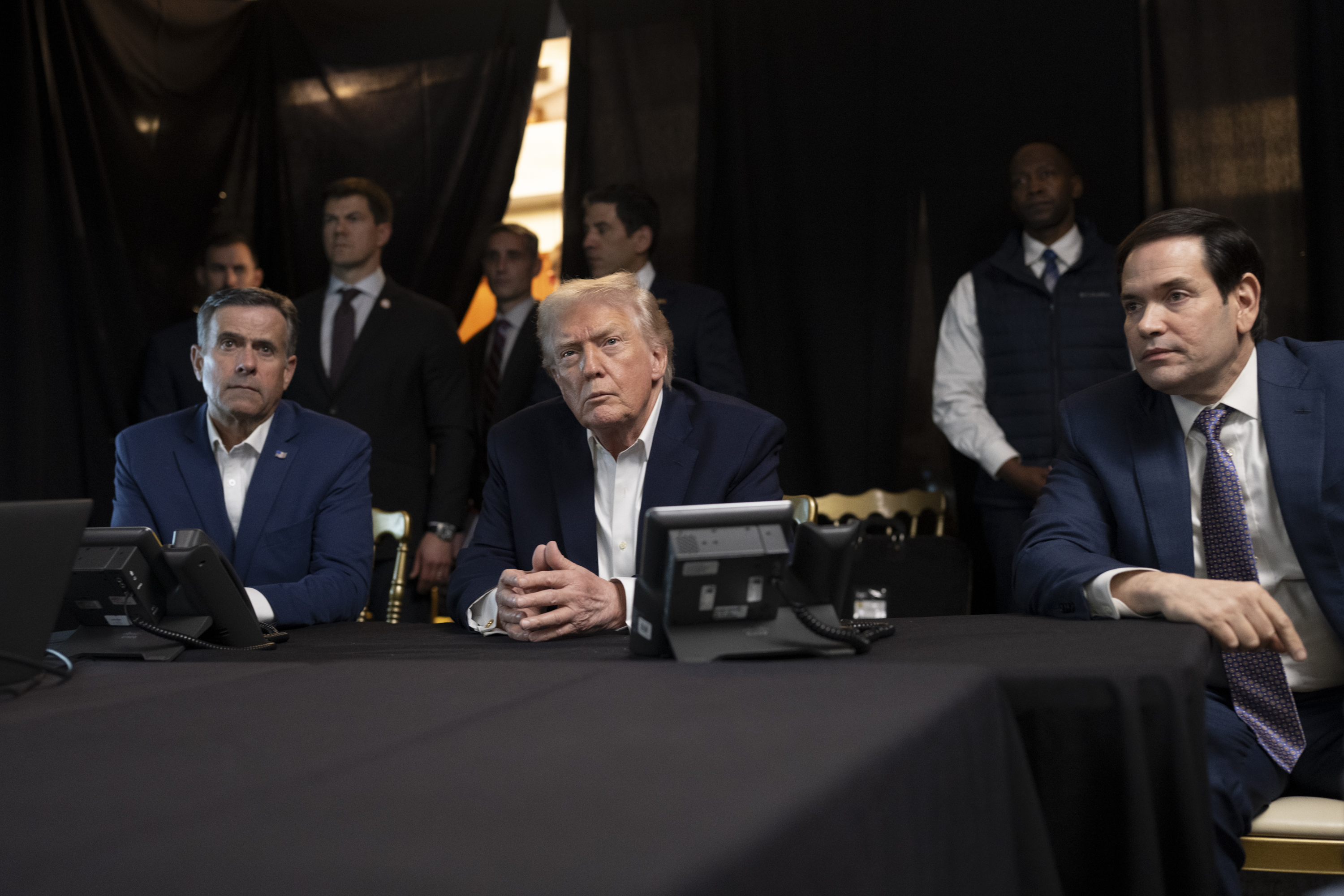
US president Donald Trump with members of his cabinet at Mar-a-Lago during Operation Absolute Resolve

On January 3, 2026, the United States launched airstrikes in Venezuela, capturing Venezuelan president Nicolás Maduro and his wife, and resulting in an estimated 80 casualties, including Maduro's personal guard, military personnel, and civilians. The airstrike was done without congressional awareness or authorization, resulting in criticism from media and a number of congressmen. Maduro and his wife were arraigned in a Manhattan federal court on 5, January 2026. Both pleaded not guilty to a number of drug trafficking charges. Followed by a purge of Maduro-era loyalists from the Venezuelan government, which was taken over by Delcy Rodríguez. Since 2026, Venezuela has been a de facto puppet state of the United States. The Trump administration, primarily through U.S. Secretary of State Marco Rubio, maintains control over its domestic finances, foreign policy, government appointments, revenues, and oil reserves.

=== Europe ===
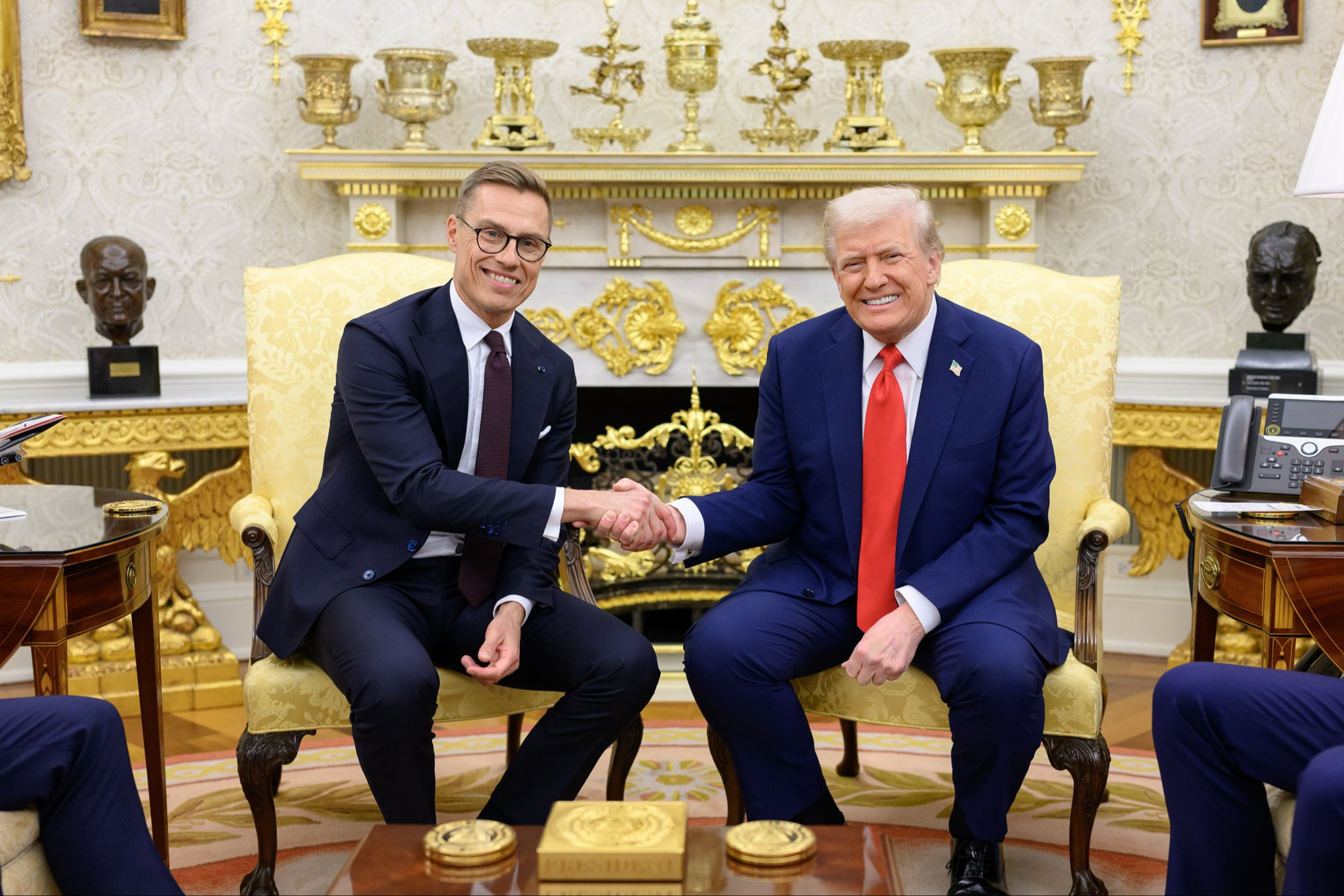
Trump has emphasized good relations with Finland, especially with the "icebreaker trade" in October 2025. He met with Finnish president Alexander Stubb at the Oval Office.

==== NATO spending ====
The Trump administration has argued that European nations should contribute more to their own defense while the U.S. focuses on China. During his 2024 campaign, he said he would not defend NATO allies if they did not meet the alliance's spending target of 2% of GDP on defense, and that he would "encourage" Russia to "do whatever the hell they want". Trump officials privately expressed contempt for European "freeloading";. Trump's policies and rhetoric accelerated an ongoing European rearmament. Trump called Poland, which exceeds the NATO defense spending target, "one of the best groups of people I have ever met".

==== Vice President JD Vance ====
Trump's administration has also expressed cultural disagreement with Europe and the European Union: in a speech at the 61st Munich Security Conference, Vice President Vance criticized European policies on free speech and democratic values, and accused European leaders of suppressing dissenting views on issues such as immigration. Vance also expressed support for lifting restrictions on the Alternative for Germany, a far-right German political party.

==== United Kingdom ====
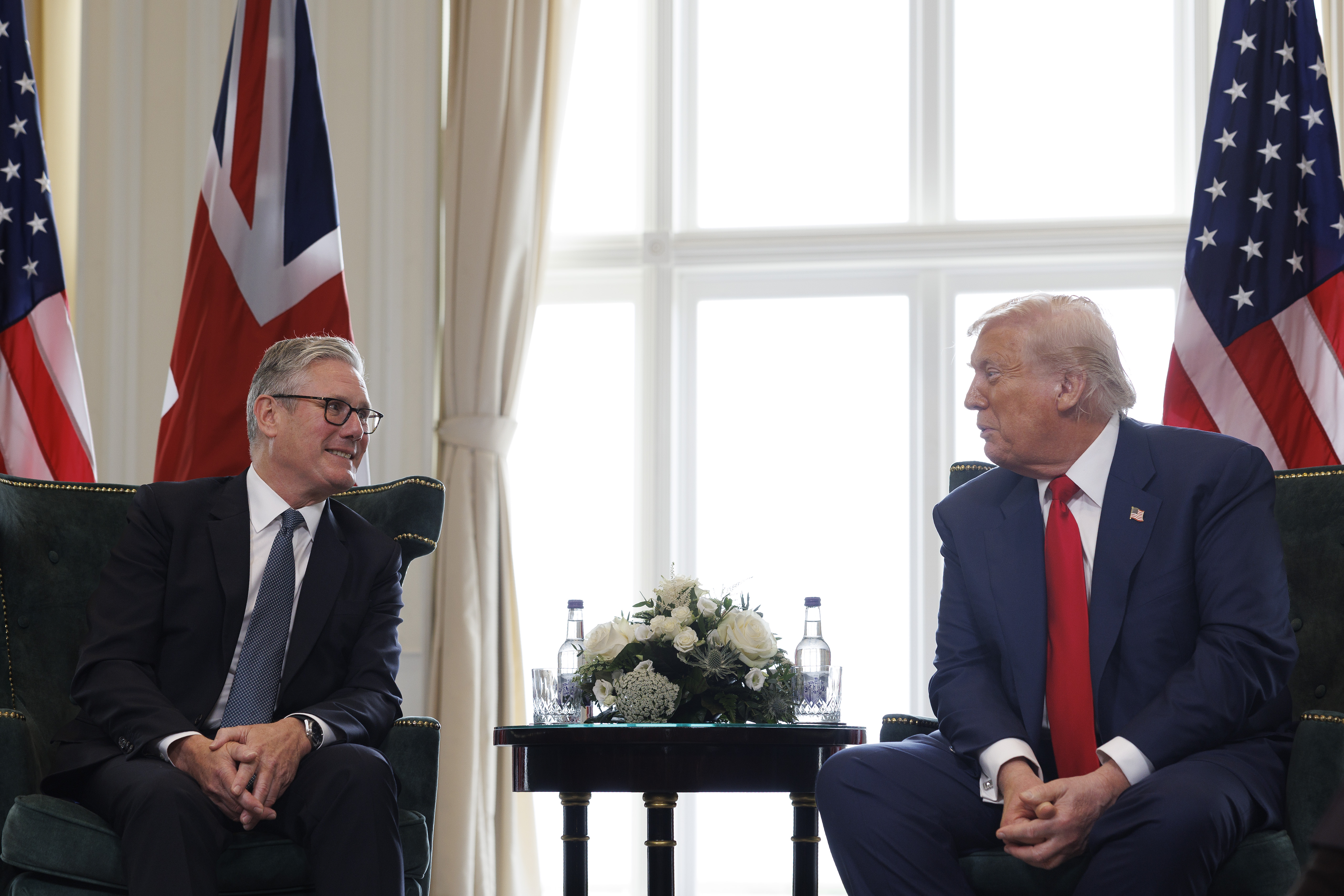
Trump with British prime minister Keir Starmer at Turnberry, Scotland, July 28, 2025

While meeting with British prime minister Keir Starmer in February 2025, Trump accepted a request from King Charles III for a state visit in the U.K.; both Trump and Starmer praised the U.S.–U.K. "Special Relationship". The state visit occurred between September 16–18, 2025. Relations became strained in March 2026 due to Starmer's refusal to join the U.S.–Israeli strikes on Iran during the 2026 Iran war or support the U.S. naval blockade of Iran, prompting Trump to repeatedly condemn the prime minister. King Charles III undertook a state visit to the United States between April 27–30, 2026 and addressed Congress, aimed partly at alleviating these tensions.

==== Ukraine ====
Trump began a push for peace negotiations to end the Russia–Ukraine war. Trump's first foreign visit as president-elect was to Paris for the reopening of the Notre-Dame de Paris, during which he met with French president Emmanuel Macron and Ukrainian president Volodymyr Zelenskyy to discuss the war, and met with other European officials. In February 2025, Trump held phone calls with Russian president Vladimir Putin and with Zelenskyy that he said marked the beginning of negotiations. He threatened Ukraine with a suspension of U.S. military aid and Russia with sanctions and tariffs if he decided they were not negotiating in good faith. The U.S. sought a mineral resources agreement with Ukraine though was unwilling to offer postwar security guarantees for Ukraine in exchange. Negotiators reached a deal on the agreement but the agreement fell through after a contentious meeting between Trump and Zelenskyy in the Oval Office that ended when the Ukrainian delegation was abruptly asked to leave. Afterwards, the U.K. and France developed a proposal in which a "coalition of the willing" would provide security guarantees to Ukraine. The U.S. and Russia held a summit in Saudi Arabia for peace talks in February and U.S. held a summit with Ukraine the next month, during which Ukraine accepted a U.S.-proposed 30-day ceasefire. Putin did not accept the ceasefire, though on March 18 Russia agreed to a 30-day ceasefire only for strikes on energy infrastructure and in the Black Sea, which Ukraine agreed to.

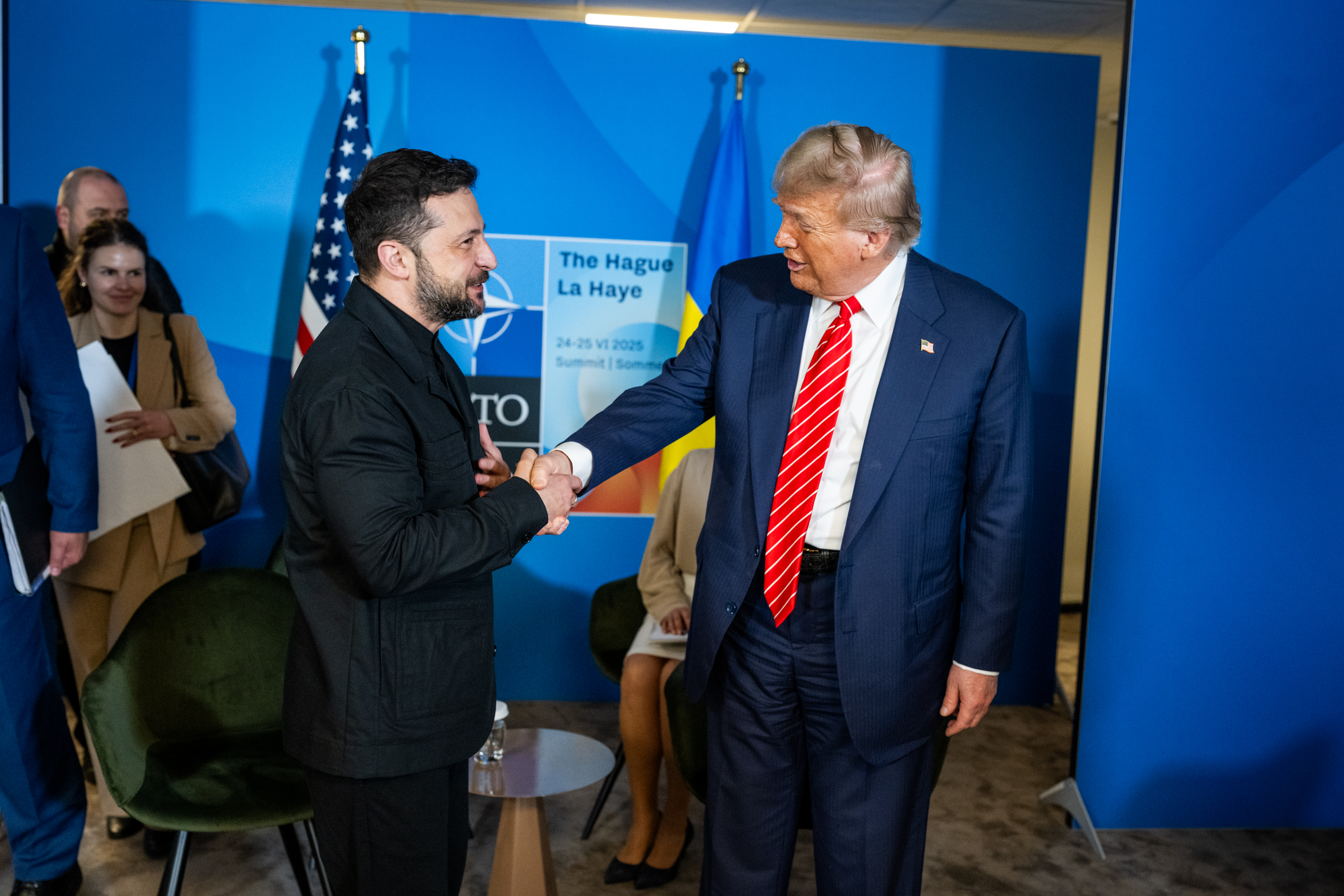
Trump and Ukrainian president Volodymyr Zelenskyy at NATO summit in The Hague, June 25, 2025

On July 9, Trump reversed a previously suspended military aid package to Ukraine following Russia's largest aerial assault on the country, involving hundreds of drones and missiles. The suspension, reportedly authorized by senior defense officials without Trump's prior knowledge. Trump expressed growing frustration with Russian president Vladimir Putin, accusing him of insincerity and relentless aggression, saying, "He wants to go all the way, just keep killing people, it's no good." The U.S. are discussing sending 10 Patriot missiles to Ukraine, and Trump said he is reviewing a proposed sanctions bill by Senator Lindsey Graham that would impose 500% tariffs on countries trading with Russia. Although Trump has previously mentioned secondary sanctions, none have been implemented so far, with the president citing their cost and waiting to see if a peace deal would emerge. On July 14, 2025, Trump threatened to impose 100% tariffs and secondary sanctions on countries purchasing Russian oil if Russia did not agree to a ceasefire within 50 days. Trump confirmed a summit meeting between him and Putin to be held on August 15, 2025, in Alaska The high-level summit at Joint Base Elmendorf–Richardson in Anchorage concluded without progress toward a ceasefire. Following the talks, Trump suggested the United States could assist Ukraine with surveillance flights or air defense support, while ruling out the deployment of ground troops.

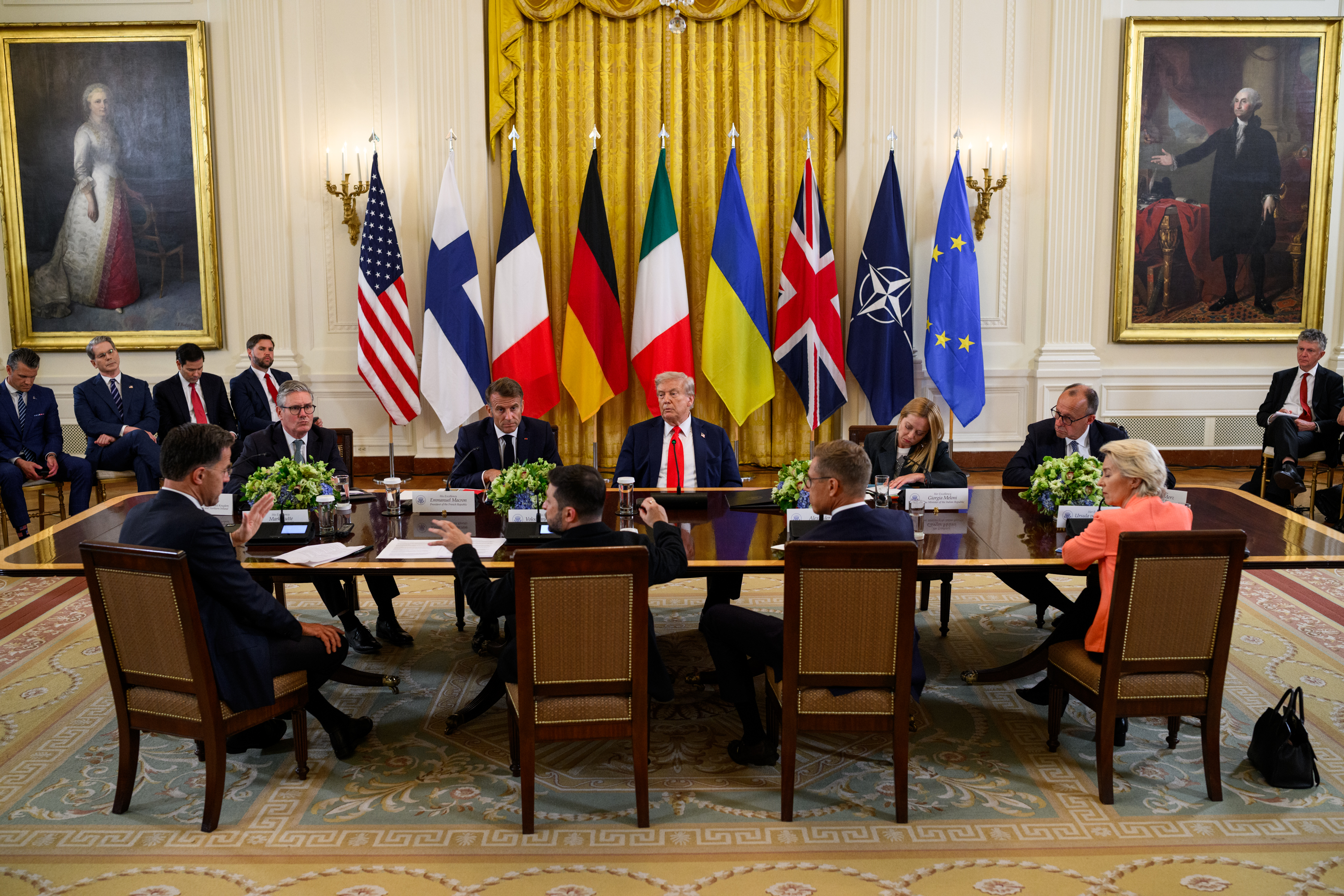
EU, NATO members and Zelenskyy in Washington, D.C., August 18, 2025

Trump emphasized that European nations should shoulder the primary burden of assistance and pressed Ukrainian president Volodymyr Zelenskyy to take greater responsibility in securing peace. He further hinted that Ukraine may eventually face difficult choices, including potential territorial concessions, to bring the conflict to an end.

In September 2025, Trump urged Europe to stop buying Russian oil and start putting economic pressure on China for funding Russia's war effort. Treasury Secretary Scott Bessent said the Trump administration is "prepared to increase pressure on Russia, but we need our European partners to follow us".

In September 2025, the Trump administration approved the delivery of the first two packages of weapons to Ukraine from US stockpiles totalling approximately $1 billion, which would be paid for by NATO allies, under the new mechanism called Prioritized Ukraine Requirements List (PURL). The mechanism aims to deliver aid worth up to $10 billion. On September 27, 2025, President Zelenskyy announced a $90 billion arms agreement with the United States in works.

On October 22, 2025, the United States imposed sanctions on Russian energy companies Rosneft and Lukoil, affecting their customers in China and India.

In November 2025, Trump proposed a peace plan that would require Ukraine to cede territory in the Donbas, including Ukrainian-controlled parts of Donetsk Oblast. The plan would also freeze the front lines in Kherson Oblast and Zaporizhzhia Oblast.

=== Africa ===
==== South Africa ====
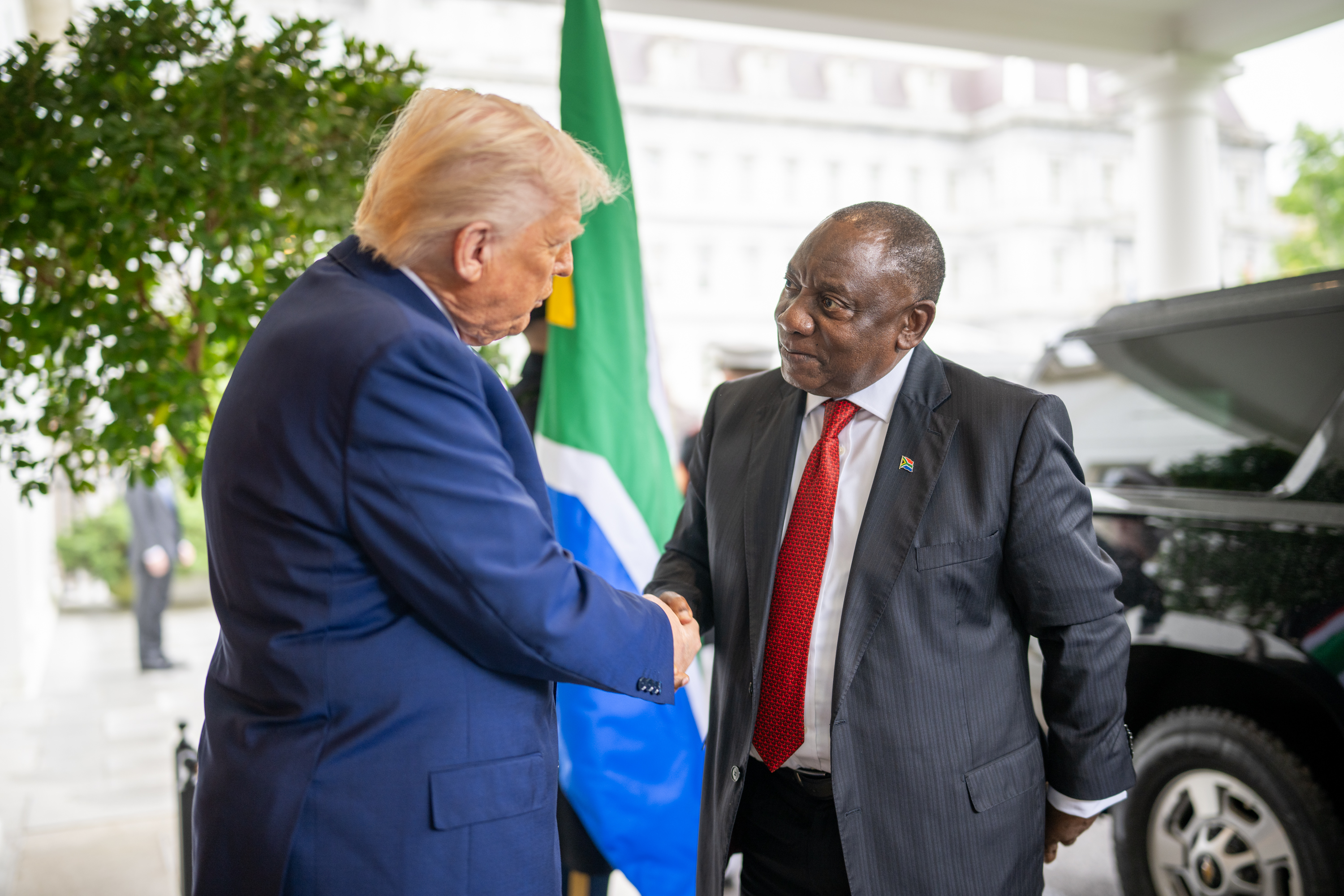
Trump with South African president Cyril Ramaphosa in May 2025

Trump's administration strained relations with South Africa. Trump suspended all aid to South Africa, saying the country's land expropriation law discriminated against Afrikaners; he also offered Afrikaners refugee status in the U.S. Rubio refused to attend the G20 foreign ministers' meeting in Johannesburg and he declared the South African ambassador persona non grata for his criticism of U.S. policies.

==== Democratic Republic of the Congo and Rwanda ====
Rubio condemned the Rwandan-backed Goma offensive in the Democratic Republic of the Congo and called for an immediate ceasefire and respect for territorial integrity. In April, U.S. officials entered into talks with the DRC on a minerals deal after a proposal from Congolese president Félix Tshisekedi.

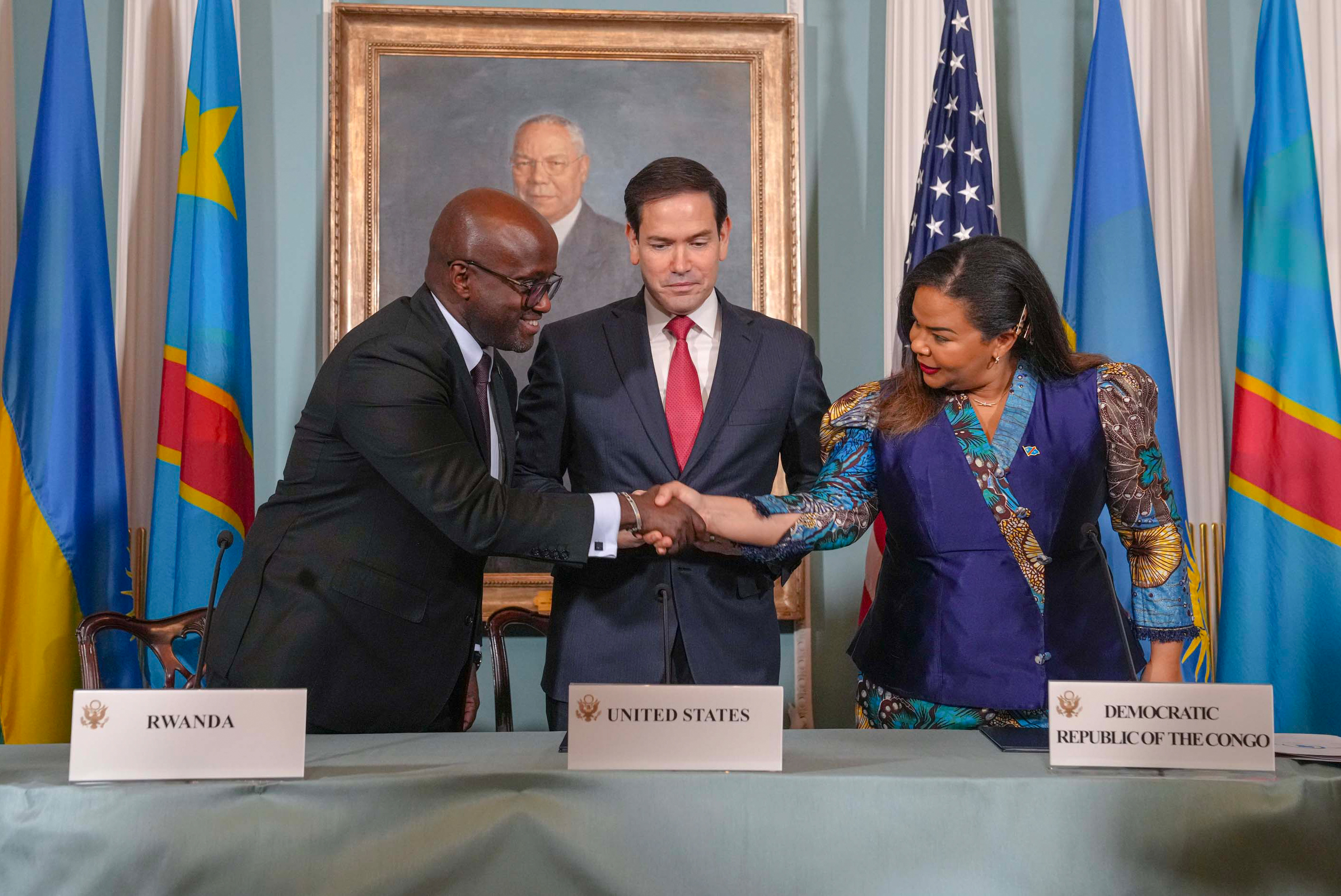
Signing ceremony for the peace agreement, Washington, D.C., June 27, 2025

In June 2025, President Trump brokered a peace deal between the Democratic Republic of Congo and Rwanda, with the U.S. getting "a lot of mineral rights". This potentially brings to an end a 30+ year conflict dating back to the 1994 Rwanda genocide. Each country had accused the other of financing and supporting rebel groups. On June 27, in a deal signed in the White House, each country pledged to end such support, allow the return of refugees, and create a joint security coordination mechanism aimed at resolving disputes.

An estimated 6 million persons have died in this conflict, and Trump said that this deal ends "one of the worst wars anyone's ever seen". A critic said, "It risks reducing peace to a transactional exchange. Minerals are only one driver of conflict." Secretary of State Marco Rubio said, "This is an important moment after 30 years of war. President Trump is a president of peace. He really does want peace. He prioritizes it above all else." A former prime minister of the DR Congo, Joseph Kabila, expressed skepticism of the peace deal, saying that it was "nothing more than a trade agreement".

==== South Sudan ====
In April 2025, the U.S. revoked all visas of and barred entry to citizens of South Sudan after a dispute over the deportation of a South Sudanese citizen.

=== Asia ===
==== Middle East ====
Trump with Recep Tayyip Erdoğan, Prabowo Subianto, and other Muslim leaders at a multilateral meeting at the United Nations, September 23, 2025

===== Houthis =====
In March 2025, the U.S. began a series of airstrikes on Houthi targets in Yemen to counter attacks on Red Sea shipping, with the goal of restoring freedom of navigation and deterring further aggression. U.S. officials accidentally included The Atlantic editor Jeffrey Goldberg in a Signal group chat discussing the military plans, sparking a political scandal and accusations of risking national security and violating records-preservation laws.

In May 2025, Trump announced that his administration had reached a ceasefire deal with the Houthis.

===== Iran =====
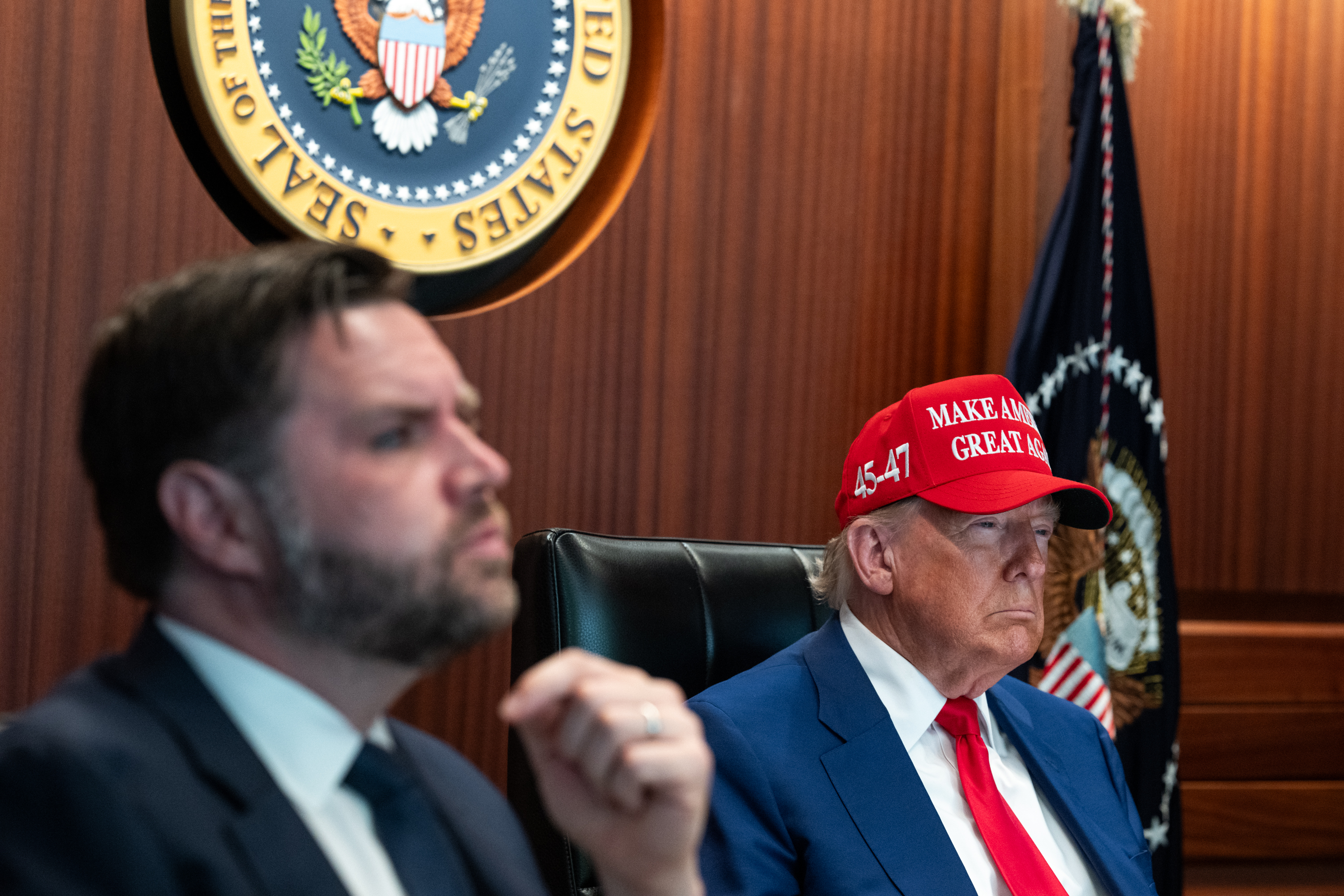
Trump and Vance in the Situation Room during strikes on Iran

The retail price of gasoline in the US increased at the outbreak of war in Iran. In late April 2026, Trump said Americans should expect higher gas prices for "a little while".

The retail price of diesel fuel in the US increased at the outbreak of war in Ukraine and Iran.

Trump reinstated his "maximum pressure" campaign against Iran and sought a new set of negotiations to limit Iran's nuclear program. In March 2025, Trump sent a letter to Iranian supreme leader Ali Khamenei urging new negotiations and warning of military action if talks fail. On June 13, 2025, Israeli planes bombed sites in Iran associated with Iran's nuclear program. President Trump stated he was not involved, although Iranian leaders have said they do not believe this. There have been reports that Trump vetoed a plan to kill Iran's Ayatollah Khamenei, and that the United States communicated to Israel that Iran has not killed an American and discussions of killing political leaders should not be on the table.

On June 21, 2025, the U.S. attacked three nuclear sites: the Fordow uranium enrichment facility, the Natanz nuclear facility, and Isfahan nuclear technology center. B-2 airplanes took off from the state of Missouri and made the 18-hour flight to Iran, being refueled multiple times en route. Entering Iranian airspace, fighter jets cleared space ahead of them, and a Navy sub fired more than 24 Tomahawk missiles. The leading B-2 dropped two Massive Ordnance Penetrators bombs (MOPs, or "bunker-busters") at the Fordo site. A total of 14 MOPs were dropped at two target sites. Secretary of Defense Pete Hegseth said, "We devastated the Iranian nuclear program, but it's worth noting that the operation did not target Iranian troops or the Iranian people." On June 22, Trump said that since the Islamic regime in control of Iran has failed to make Iran great, it should be replaced to "Make Iran Great Again". Later, he posted on social media that their constant anger, hostility, and despair have only led them to ruin. The path they're on offers no hope, only more hardship, "I wish the leadership of Iran would realize that you often get more with honey than you do with vinegar".

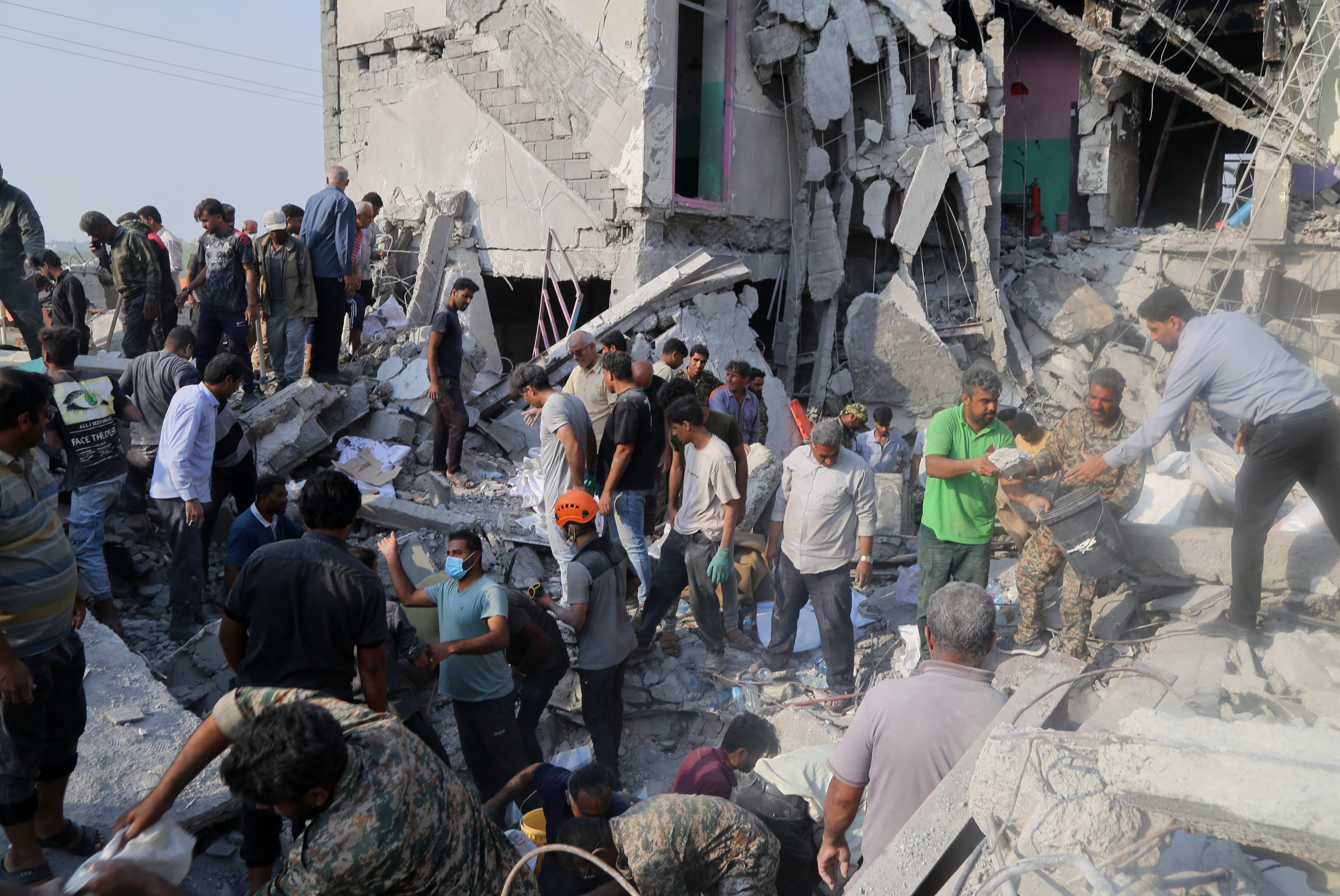
Rescuers and residents at the site of the Shajareh Tayyebeh girls' school in Minab, Iran, which was destroyed by a U.S. military strike on February 28, 2026

During the 2025–2026 Iranian protests, Trump repeatedly warned the Iranian authorities that the U.S. would "intervene" if the regime did not halt its crackdown on protesters. On January 16, 2026, Trump announced that the Iranian leadership had reportedly canceled over 800 planned executions. On February 28, 2026, Trump launched a major attack on Iran with Israel with the stated goal of regime change. On March 21, 2026, Trump announced a 48-hour ultimatum on Truth Social calling for Iran to open the Strait of Hormuz, threatening the destruction of Iranian power infrastructure. Over the following week, specifically on March 23 and 26, Trump announced two different extensions to the ultimatum. On March 26, an official pause on "the period of Energy Plant destruction" until April 2, 2026, was announced on social media, an extension he later stated was a result of Iran allowing oil-carrying ships to safely pass through the Strait of Hormuz.

On April 4 and 5, 2026, Trump resumed posting threats of US attack on Iranian infrastructure, stating April 7, 2026, as the deadline for the Strait of Hormuz to be opened. On April 7, Trump posted to Truth Social that "a whole civilization will die tonight, never to be brought back again", causing domestic concern that Trump would use nuclear weapons, and resulting in a number of bipartisan calls for the 25th Amendment to be invoked. The White House confirmed in an official statement that there is currently no consideration of usage of nuclear weaponry. Following the failure of the Islamabad Talks to end the war, Trump imposed a naval blockade on Iran on April 13. In June 2026, after concluding that continued hostilities would risk economic calamity, Trump signed a Memorandum of Understanding (MOU) on behalf of the United States during a ceremony at the Palace of Versailles on June 17, 2026. According to a report by the Wall Street Journal, Trump was initially pleased how the Iran war was going, notably after the killing of Ali Khamenei. However, with increase in fuel prices and a stalemate in the war, leaders from Saudi Arabia and Qatar pushed the US government for a diplomatic solution, while nearly 80% of Americans, according to polls, favored an agreement to end the war, prompting Trump to pursue the June truce.

In September 2026, a UN-commissioned fact-finding mission panel found "reasonable grounds" to believe that the United States had committed war crimes during military strikes in Iran during the 2026 Iran war. The report highlighted two February 28 strikes that killed at least 178 civilians. U.S. President Donald Trump's threats to completely destroy Iranian power plants and other essential infrastructure during the 2026 Iran war have been widely condemned by human rights organizations, legal experts, and lawmakers as potential war crimes.

On October 5, 2026, during a rally in Grand Island, Nebraska, Trump said that Iran could "take out" Los Angeles or San Diego, calling this a "small price to pay" for keeping the United States safe. The remarks were criticized by California officials. including Governor Gavin Newsom and Los Angeles Mayor Karen Bass.

===== Israel and Gaza =====
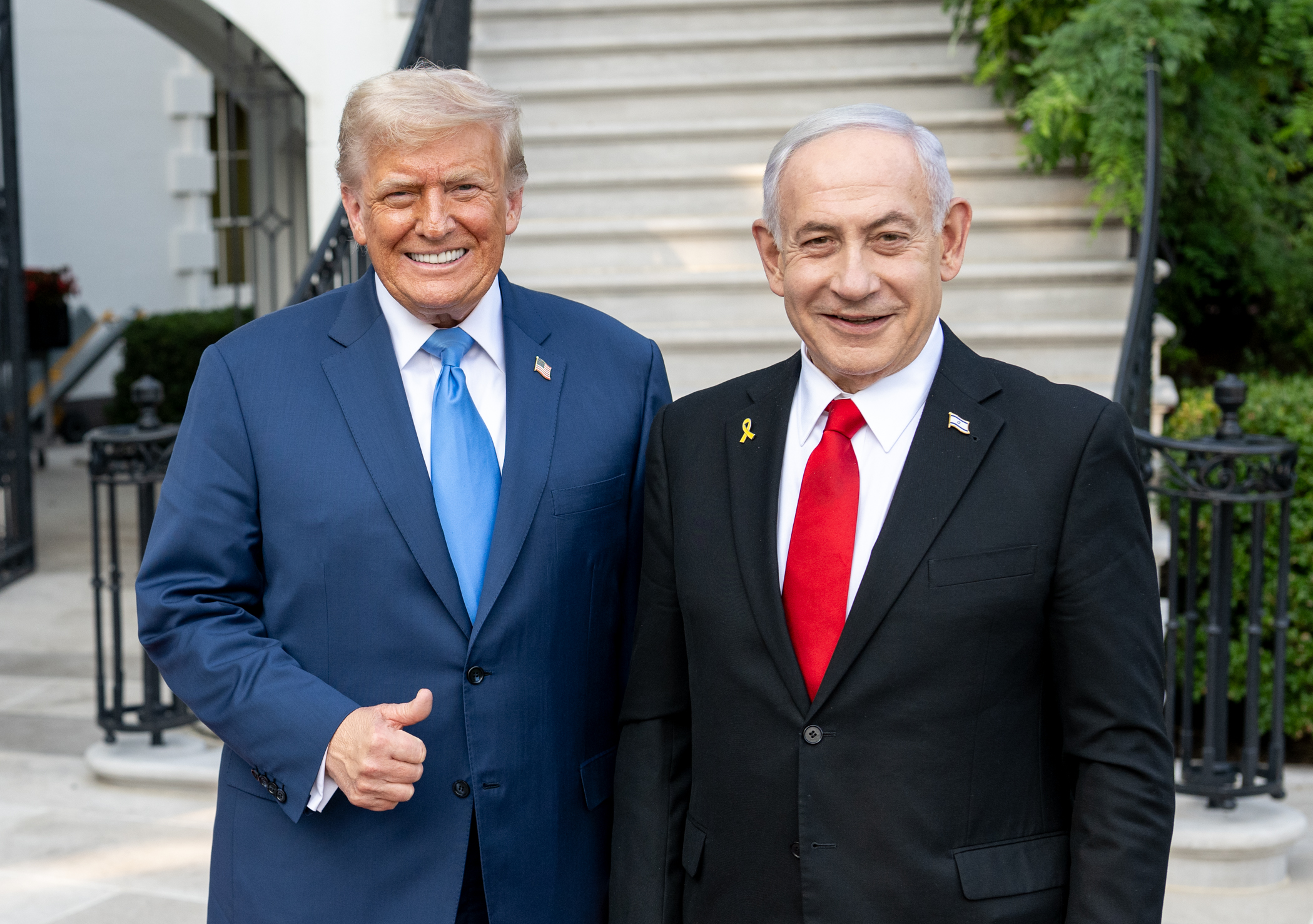
President Trump hosting Benjamin Netanyahu at the White House on July 7, 2025

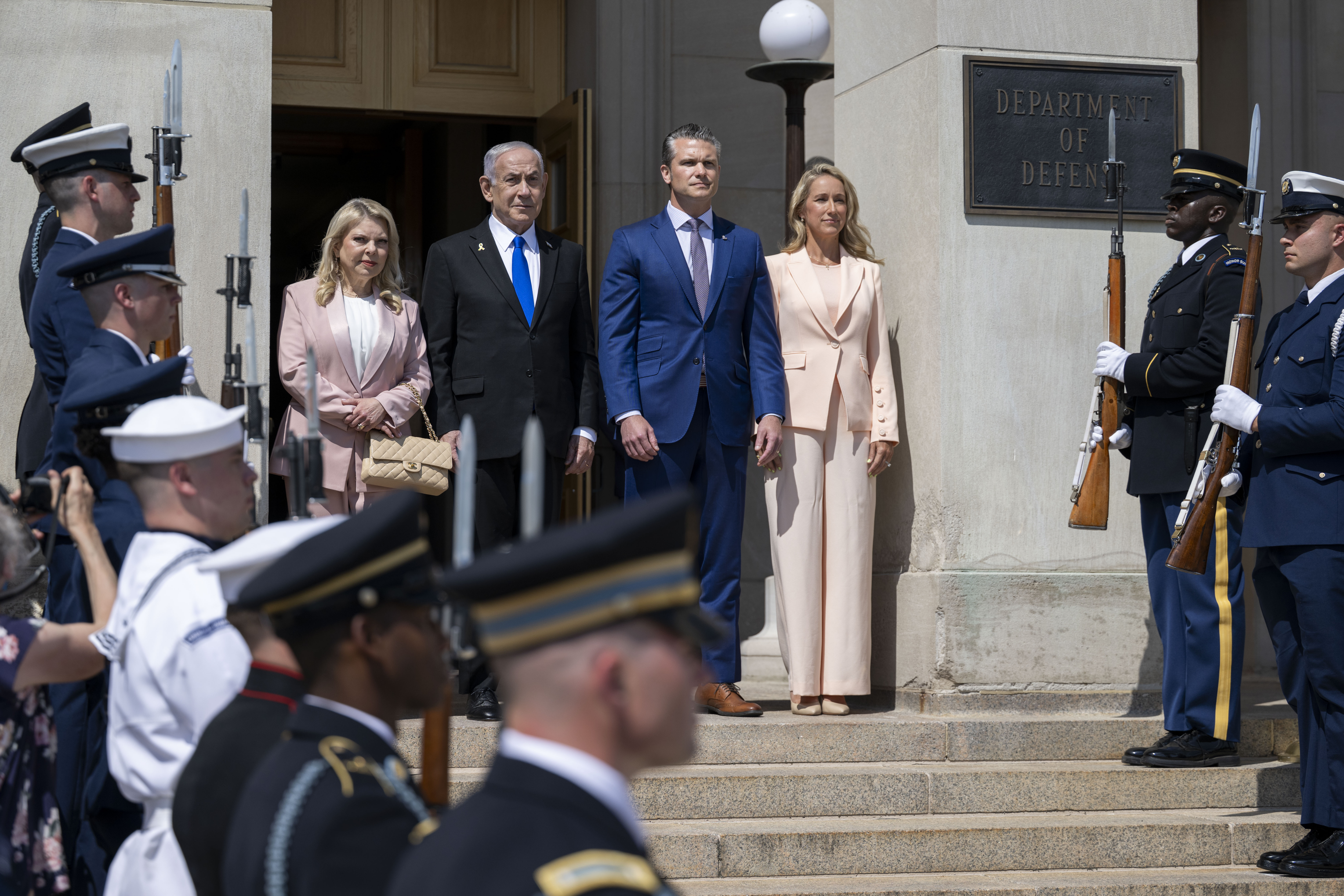
Secretary of Defense Pete Hegseth hosting Netanyahu at the Pentagon on July 9, 2025

After being elected in November 2024, Trump said he wished to end the Gaza war, telling Israeli prime minister Benjamin Netanyahu to end Israel's invasion within two months and warning Hamas that they would have "all hell to pay" if they did not agree to a ceasefire and release all hostages by Trump's inauguration. Trump's incoming administration joined the Biden administration in pressuring negotiations, and Israel and Hamas agreed to a phased ceasefire on January 15, 2025. In February 2025, Trump proposed an American takeover of Gaza in which the territory's Palestinian population would be relocated to allow for its redevelopment, which was criticized by Egypt and Jordan. The ceasefire lasted until March 18, when Israel launched attacks on Gaza. Trump's special envoy Steve Witkoff blamed Hamas for renewed fighting in Gaza.

On May 16, while in Abu Dhabi, United Arab Emirates, Trump said, "We're looking at Gaza. And we're going to get that taken care of. A lot of people are starving." This is an area of tension between President Trump and Prime Minister Benjamin Netanyahu. Israel claims that Hamas systemically raids food aid in order to support its operations, and Israel has put forward a plan of food distributed through a system of hubs run by private contractors and protected by Israeli soldiers. The U.S.-backed Gaza Humanitarian Foundation has been set up to carry out this plan and announced it would be ready to begin operations by the end of May.

On July 28, while in Scotland, President Trump said he believed there was starvation occurring in Gaza. He further added, "Nobody's done anything great over there. The whole place is a mess... I told Israel maybe they have to do it a different way." Israeli Prime Minister said, "And what has interdicted the supply of humanitarian aid is one force, Hamas. Again, the reversal of truth."

Asked about an Israeli double-strike on a hospital on August 25, 2025, Trump said he was "not happy about it", adding, "We have to end this whole nightmare."

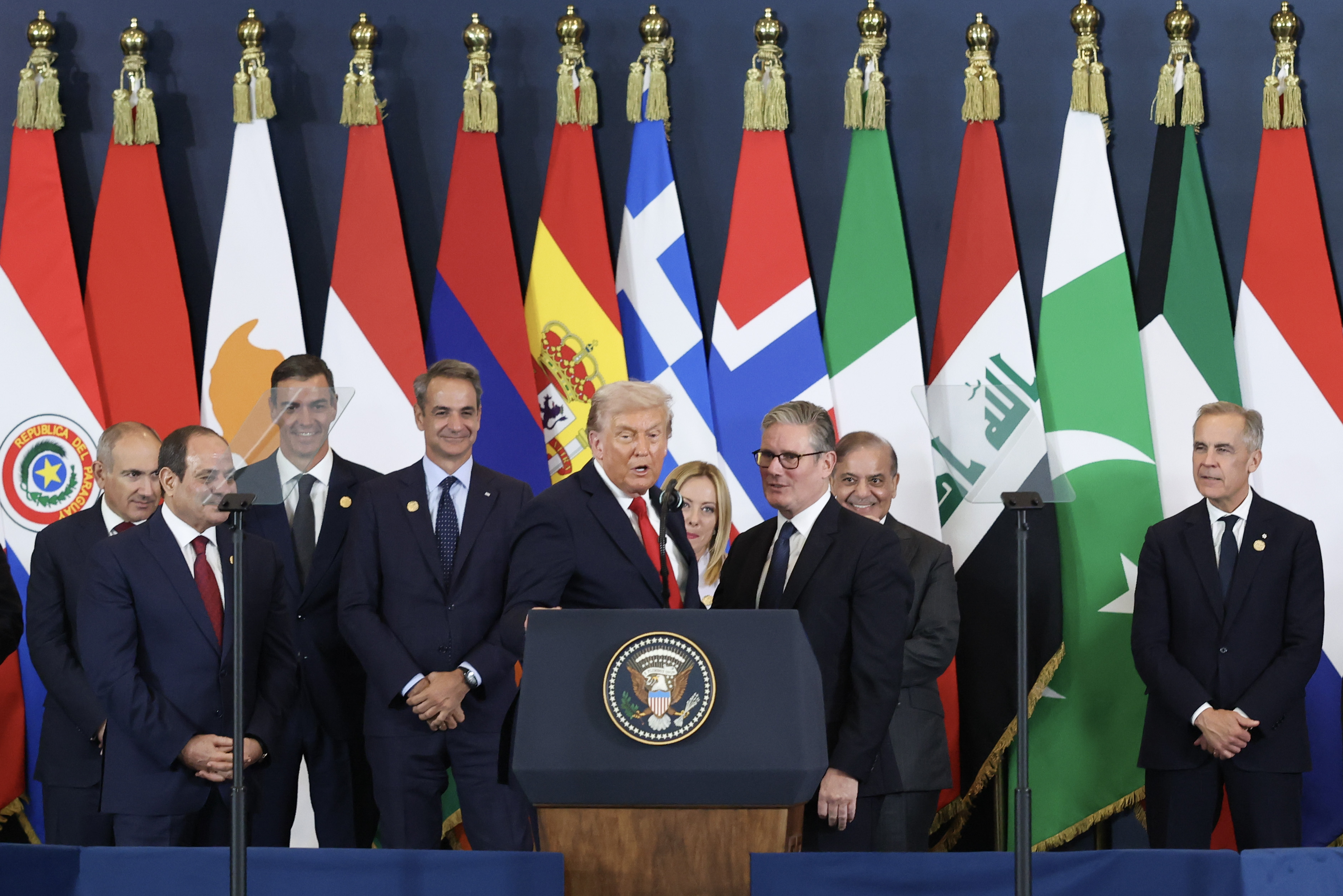
Trump at the Gaza peace summit in Sharm El Sheikh, Egypt, on October 13, 2025

On September 29, 2025, President Trump announced, alongside Prime Minister Netanyahu, a 20-Point Gaza peace plan from the White House which consisted of 20 specific points aimed at achieving a ceasefire, the return of Israeli hostages, dismantling Hamas's military capabilities, and establishing a transitional governance structure in the Gaza Strip.

In October 2025, President Trump announced his deal for a ceasefire between Israel and Hamas had been reached and that the remaining hostages would be released. In exchange, Israel will release 250 Palestinian prisoners serving longterm sentences and another 1,700 other prisoners. The Israeli military will withdraw from a "blue line" to a "yellow line" further away from the Gaza coast. Trump was widely praised for negotiating this settlement, including by former presidents Bill Clinton and Barack Obama and former Secretary of State and 2016 presidential candidate Hillary Clinton.

In November 2026, Trump announced that the US will terminate all military aid to Israel, totaling $4 billion per year, by the end of 2026, but will continue to sell military hardware.

===== Qatar =====
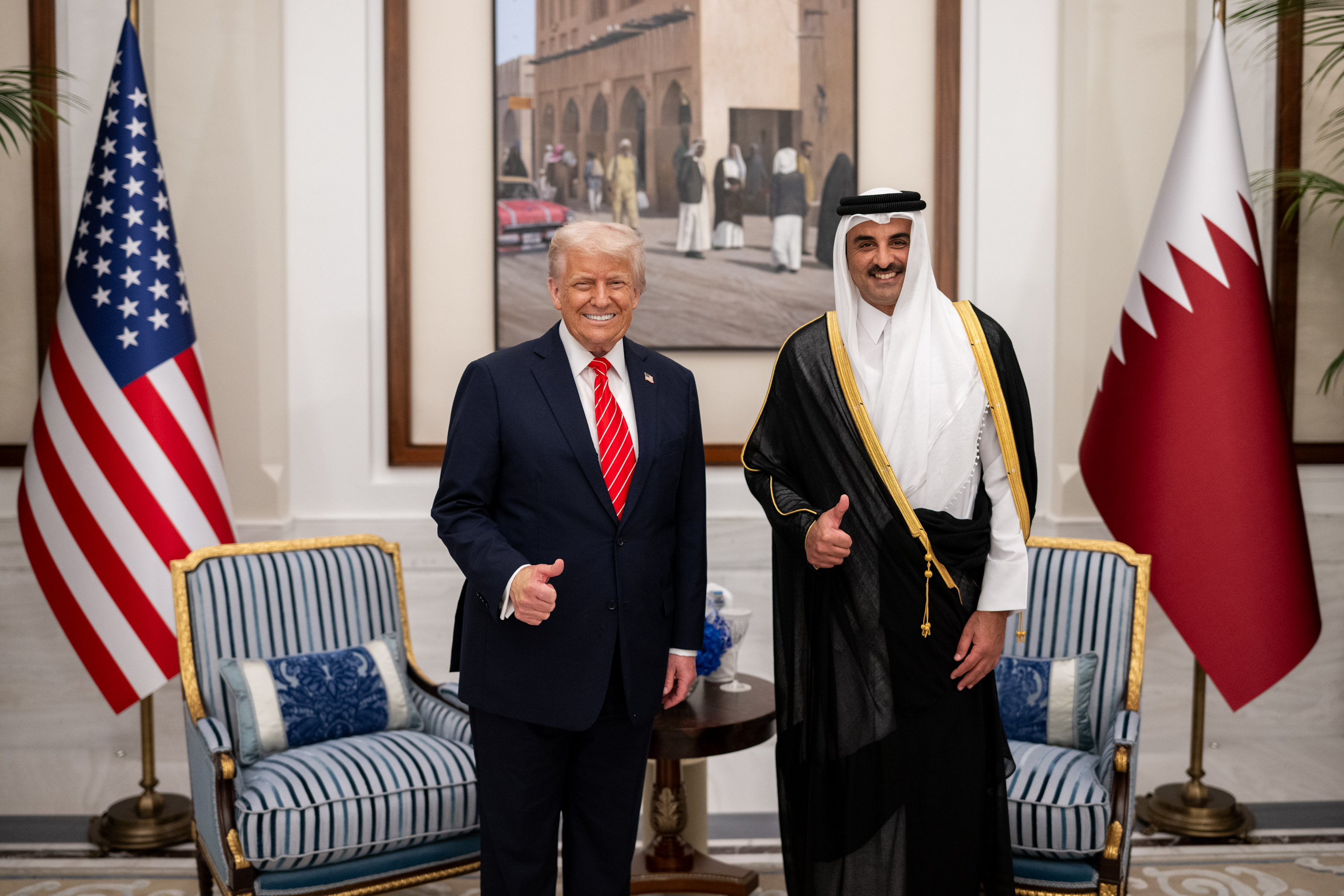
Trump and Qatar's emir Tamim bin Hamad Al Thani in Lusail, Qatar during Donald Trump's visit to the Middle East, May 2025

In September 2025, following an Israeli strike against suspected Hamas terrorists in Qatar's capital city of Doha, President Trump signed an executive order which stated, "The United States shall regard any armed attack on the territory, sovereignty, or critical infrastructure of the State of Qatar as a threat to the peace and security of the United States." President Biden had begun a closer relationship with Qatar following their help with the 2001 American withdrawal from Afghanistan. In January 2022, Biden named Qatar a major non-NATO ally.

The editorial board of The Wall Street Journal wrote, "This is a decision that can be and should have been debated. Instead it comes out of the blue – an executive order following no public debate."

In October, Defense Secretary Hegseth announced a training agreement that the Qatar Air Force will build a facility at the Mountain Home Air Force Base in Idaho. The United States has a similar arrangement with Singapore, at the same base. Hegseth emphasized that the U.S. will remain in charge of the facility "like we do with all partners".

===== Syria =====
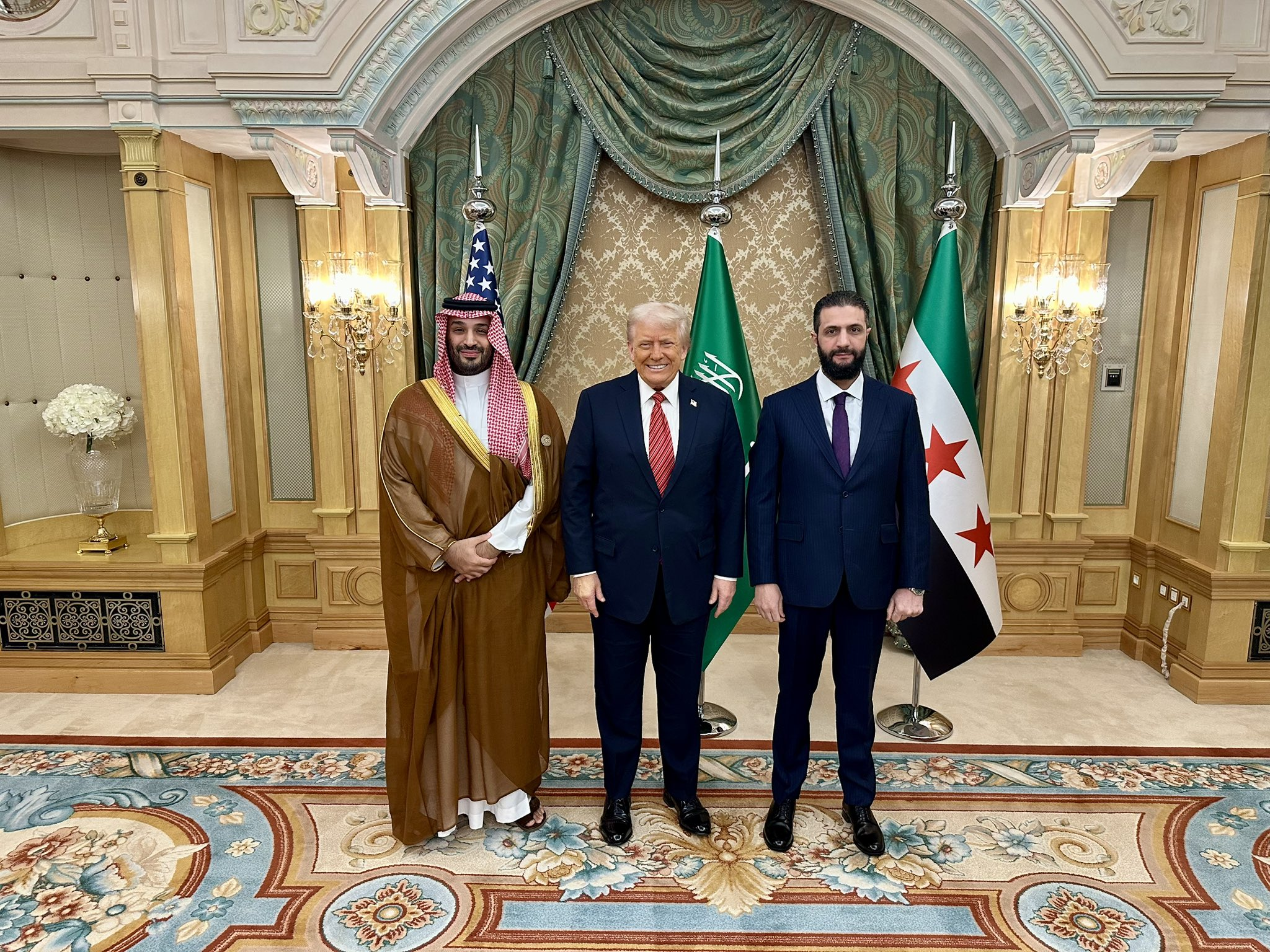
Trump with Syrian president Ahmed al-Sharaa and Crown Prince of Saudi Arabia Mohammed bin Salman in Riyadh, Saudi Arabia, May 14, 2025

During the 2024 Syrian opposition offensives that toppled the Assad regime in Syria, Trump said that the U.S. should stay out of the conflict. In March 2025, Rubio condemned the massacres of Syrian Alawites. Trump agreed to lift sanctions on Syria after discussing the situation with Mohammed bin Salman and Erdoğan in May 2025.

==== Indian subcontinent ====
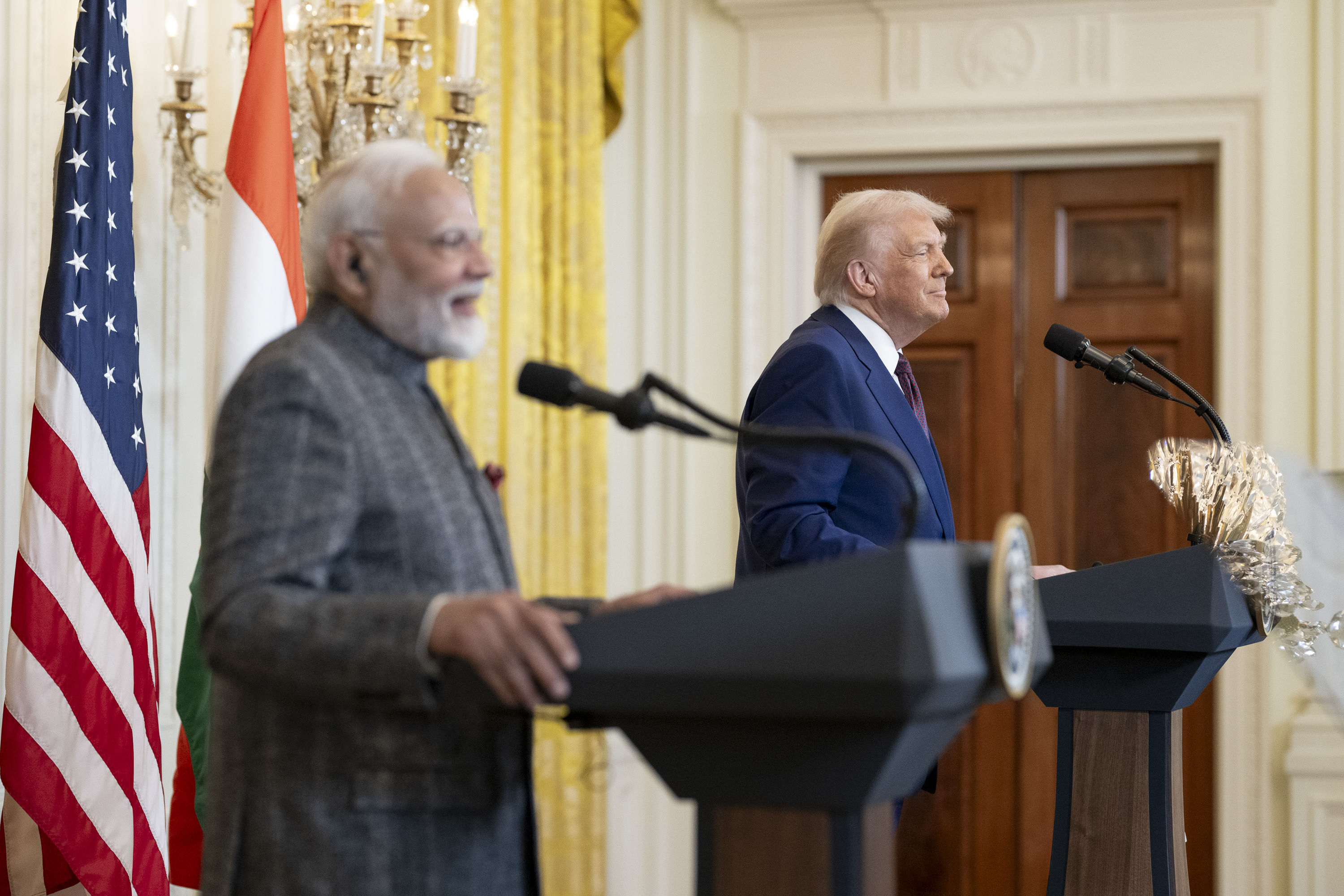
Trump with Indian prime minister Narendra Modi, February 2025

India rejected Trump's offer to mediate India–China tensions. On February 13, 2025, Indian prime minister Narendra Modi became the fourth world leader to visit Donald Trump at the White House.

In early 2025, deportations to Bhutan of Nepali-speaking Bhutanese refugees who had been settled in the US for nearly two decades resulted in statelessness of the deportees following their interrogation and expulsion from Bhutan upon arrival. Some of the refouled refugees, who had encountered largely minor legal issues in the US, were then arrested for illegal entry to Nepal upon seeking to re-enter the refugee camps they had previously inhabited before US resettlement.

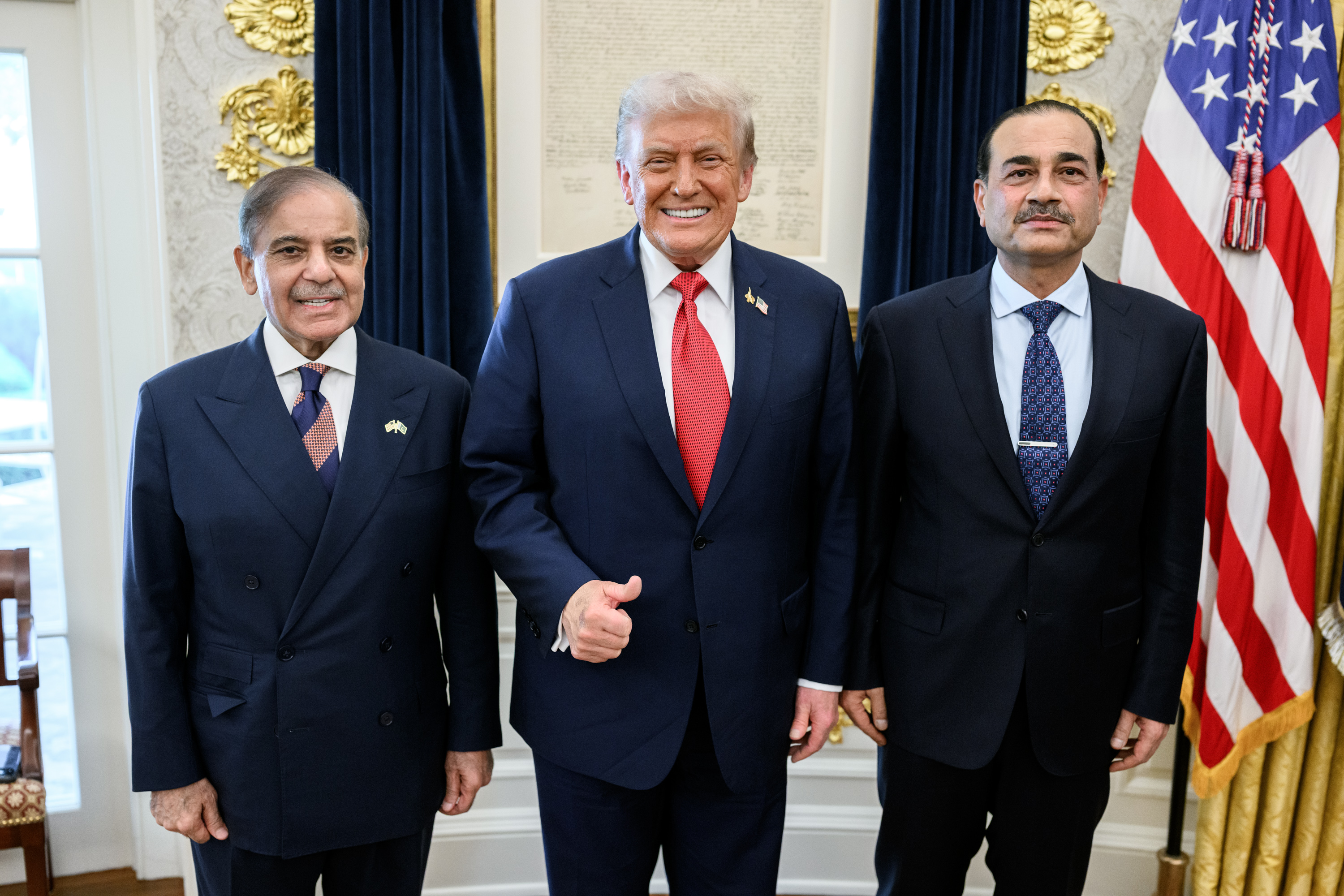
Trump with Pakistani prime minister Shehbaz Sharif (left) and Pakistani chief of Army staff Asim Munir (right)

In response to the 2025 India–Pakistan conflict, Vice President Vance said that, a potential war between India and Pakistan is "none of our business". Trump claimed to have negotiated a ceasefire, a claim that Pakistan corroborated and India denied.

In July 2025, Trump criticized India over its continued oil trade with Russia, despite ongoing Western sanctions. On July 30, 2025, Trump announced that Indian products would be subject to 25% reciprocal tariffs upon arrival in the United States starting August 1, and that a "penalty" would be added for the purchase of Russian oil. On August 6, 2025, Trump raised the tariff to 50%, a 25% increase, over India's purchase of Russian oil.

In July 2025, Trump's administration reached a trade agreement with Pakistan, in which Trump announced that the United States would help Pakistan develop its large and untapped oil reserves. The agreement also reduced American reciprocal tariffs on Pakistan to 19%, the lowest of any country in South Asia.

==== Caucasus ====
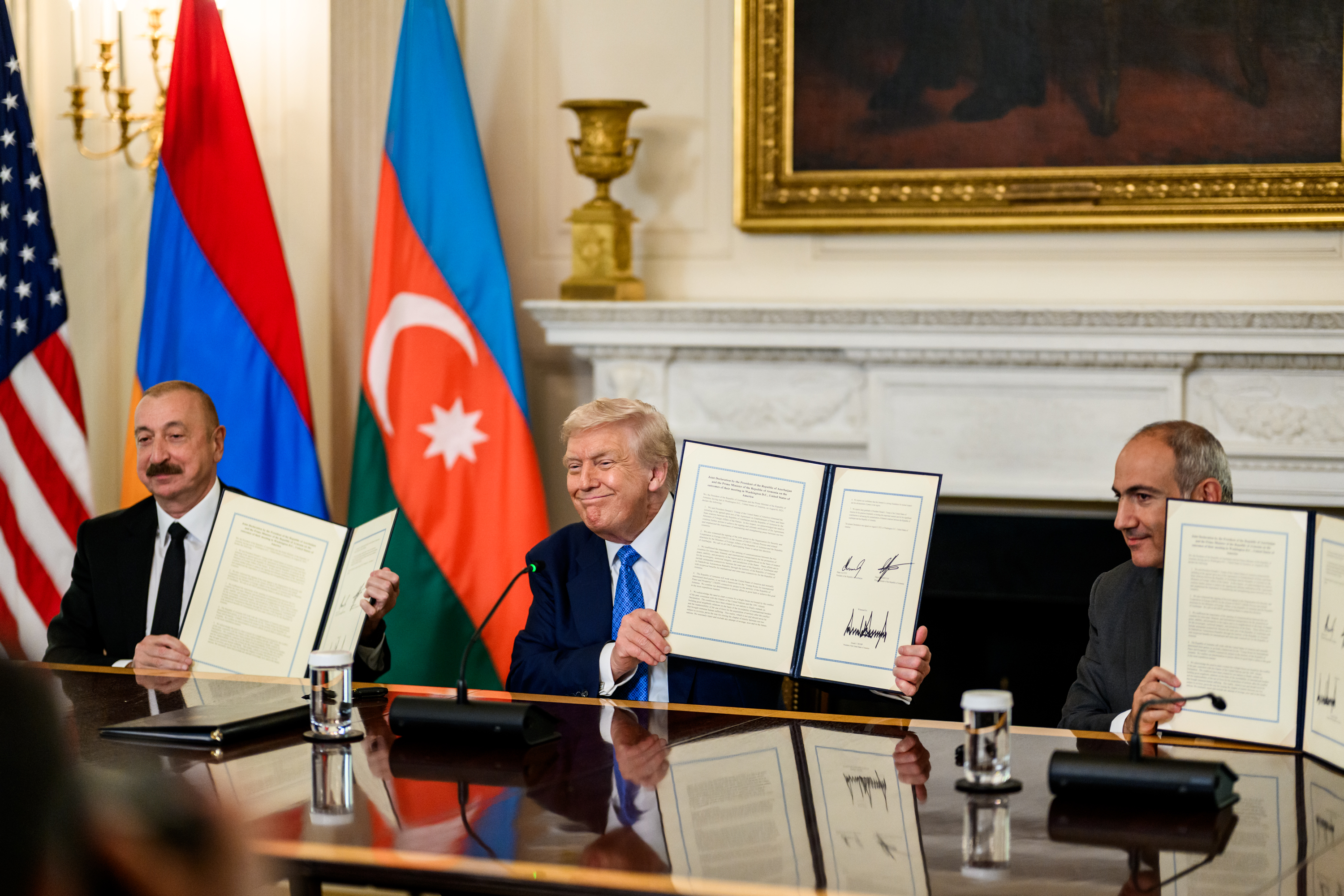
Azerbaijani president Ilham Aliyev, President Trump and Armenian prime minister Nikol Pashinyan signing a trilateral joint declaration in Washington, D.C., on August 8, 2025

On April 24, 2025, during the first Armenian Genocide Remembrance Day of Trump's second term, the White House issued a statement commemorating the day that did not use the term "genocide". This was seen as a reversal after Joe Biden formally recognized the Armenian genocide in 2021. The second Trump administration continues to avoid using the term "genocide", instead continuing to refer to the events as the Medz Yeghern (Armenian for 'Great Catastrophe') and labeling April 24 as only "Armenian Remembrance Day".

On August 8, 2025, Armenian prime minister Nikol Pashinyan and Azerbaijani president Ilham Aliyev signed a peace agreement in a ceremony hosted by President Donald Trump in the White House, aiming to end the more than 35-year conflict between Armenia and Azerbaijan.

==== Southeast Asia ====
In 2025, Trump attempted to negotiate a ceasefire in the border conflict between Cambodia and Thailand.

==== China ====
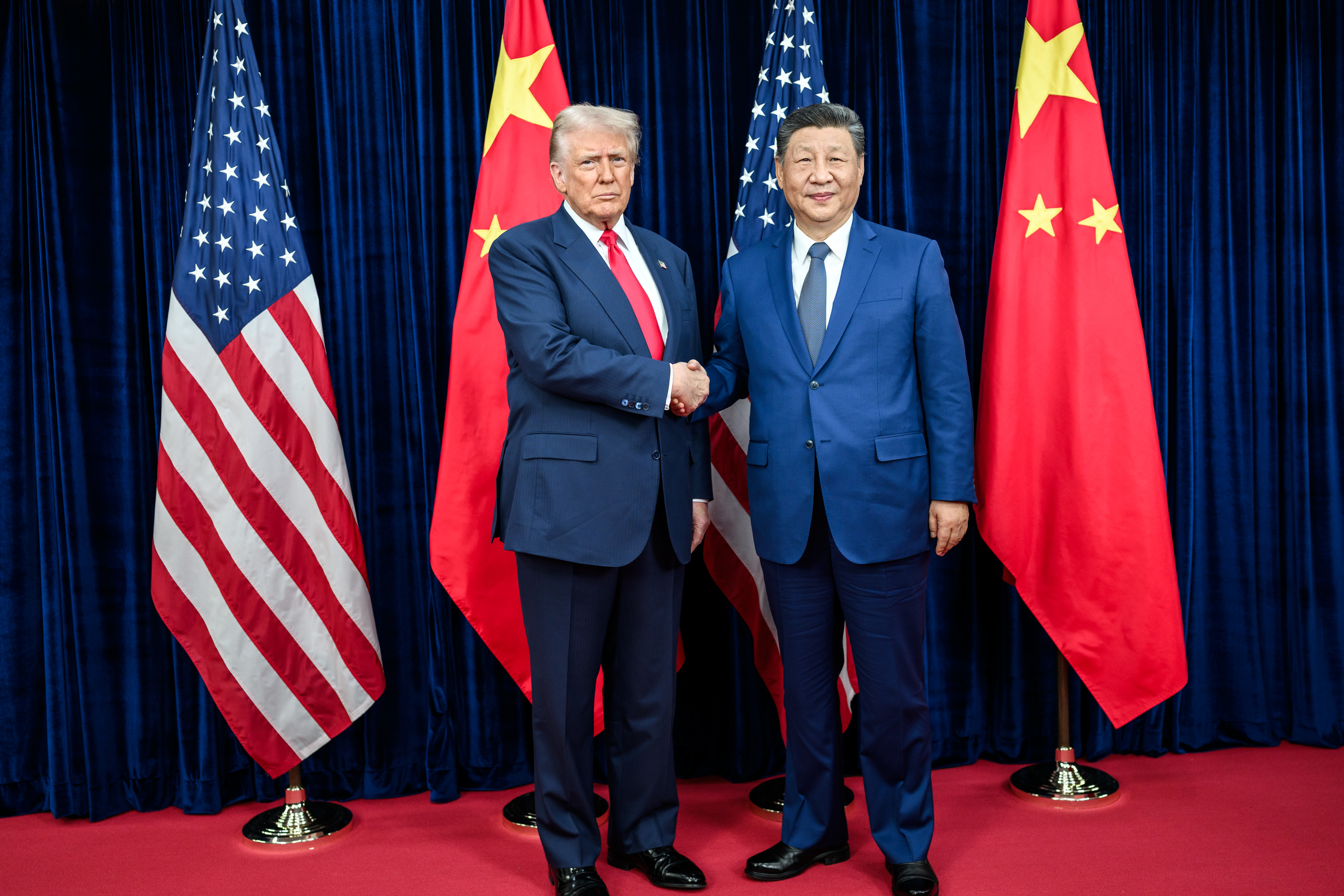
Trump meets with Chinese leader Xi Jinping at the summit meeting in Busan on October 30, 2025

In February 2025, Trump signed an executive order that directed the Committee on Foreign Investment in the United States (CFIUS) to restrict Chinese investment in strategic economic areas.

Trump blamed China for the opioid crisis in the United States. He said the tariffs are intended to pressure China to do more to stop the flow of fentanyl into the US. Opioids, predominantly fentanyl, have killed over 500,000 Americans since 2012.

In September 2025, Trump asked the EU to impose 100% tariffs on China to punish it for buying Russian oil and de facto financing Russia's invasion of Ukraine.

=== Oceania ===
==== Australia ====
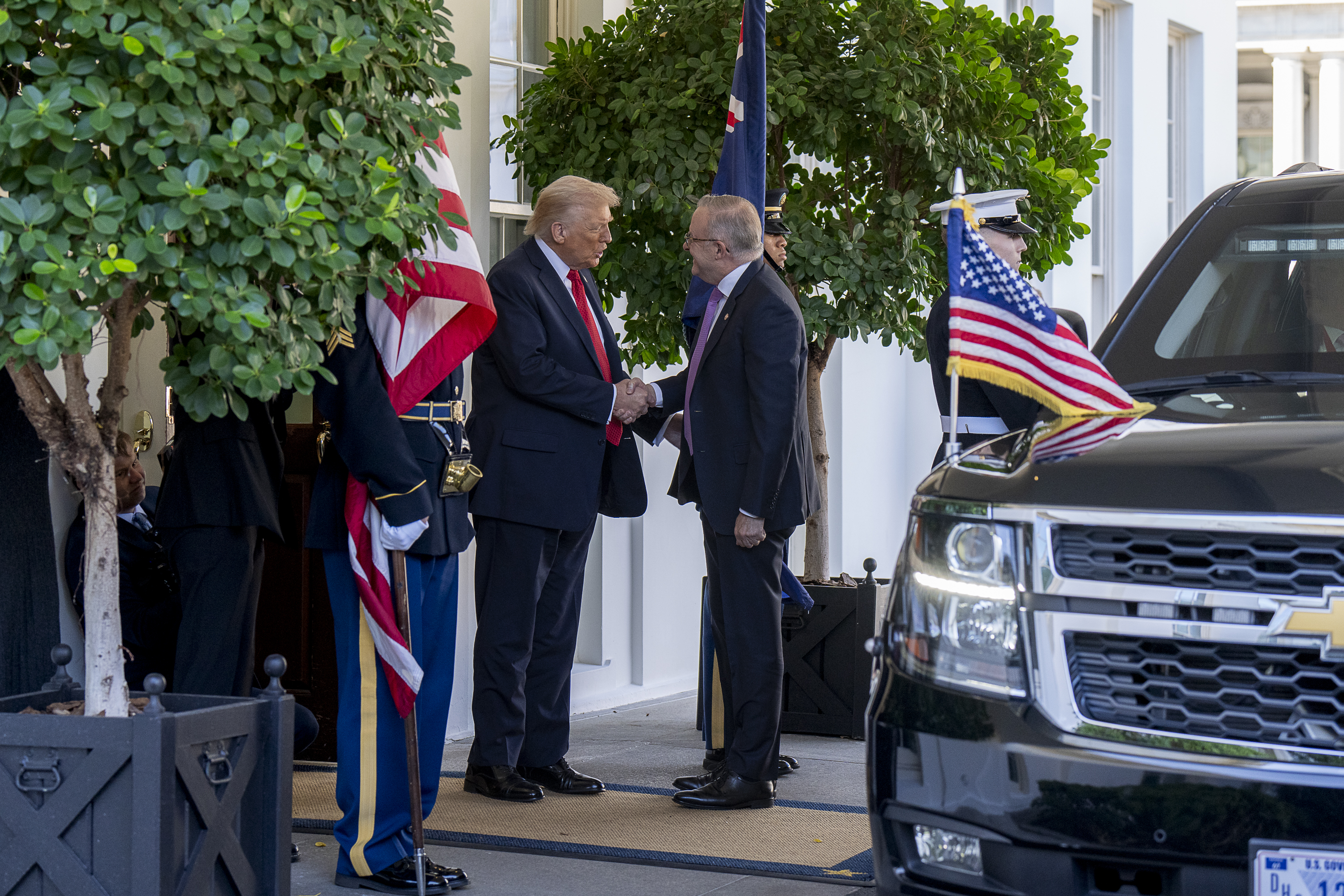
Trump greets Australian Prime Minister Anthony Albanese at the White House, October 20, 2025

On October 21, 2025, partly as a consequence of the China–U.S. trade war that included China imposing restrictions on its sale of processed rare-earth elements, Trump signed a deal with Anthony Albanese, Prime Minister of Australia, over rare-earths and other critical minerals (Note: Rare-earth elements or minerals are distinct from minerals or materials described as critical minerals or raw materials, which refers to materials that are considered to be of strategic or economic importance to a country. There is no single list, but individual governments compile lists of materials that are critical for their own economies. However the two terms are often used interchangeably, especially in the U.S.) that are needed for commercial clean energy production and technologically advanced military hardware. They each committed to provide at least US$1bn (A$1.54bn) towards a number of projects worth $US8.5bn (A$13bn) in both countries over six months. The deal has been well received by the Australian rare-earths industry and the markets, and is important to the U.S. because rare earths are used in many technologies, including components of the Defense Force such as F-35 fighter jets and Tomahawk missiles. The deal is also seen as a major shift in economic alliances.

=== Foreign aid ===
==== Freezing most programs for 90 days ====
DOGE dismantled most of USAID, which had been a 10,000-person agency originally tasked to carry-out humanitarian projects. USAID's critics maintained that many of the projects were in fact not all that humanitarian and/or much of the money was not well spent.

In January 2025, the administration issued a 90-day stop-work order worldwide, Stop work interrupted about 30 clinical trials, and interrupted projects such as emergency medical care for displaced Palestinians and Yemenis, aid for war refugees on the Sudan-Chad border, and electricity for Ukrainian refugees. The HIV Modeling Consortium estimated the death toll from HIV in sub-Saharan Africa at approximately 15,000 adults and 1,600 children in the one month after Trump's January 2025 funding freeze. A key controversy is whether or not waivers are being made and money actually starting to flow again for the most essential programs. For example, the Associated Press reported on February 19, that waivers for PEPFAR, the program that has saved 26 million lives from AIDS, were not in force, despite a federal judge having lifted the funding freeze.

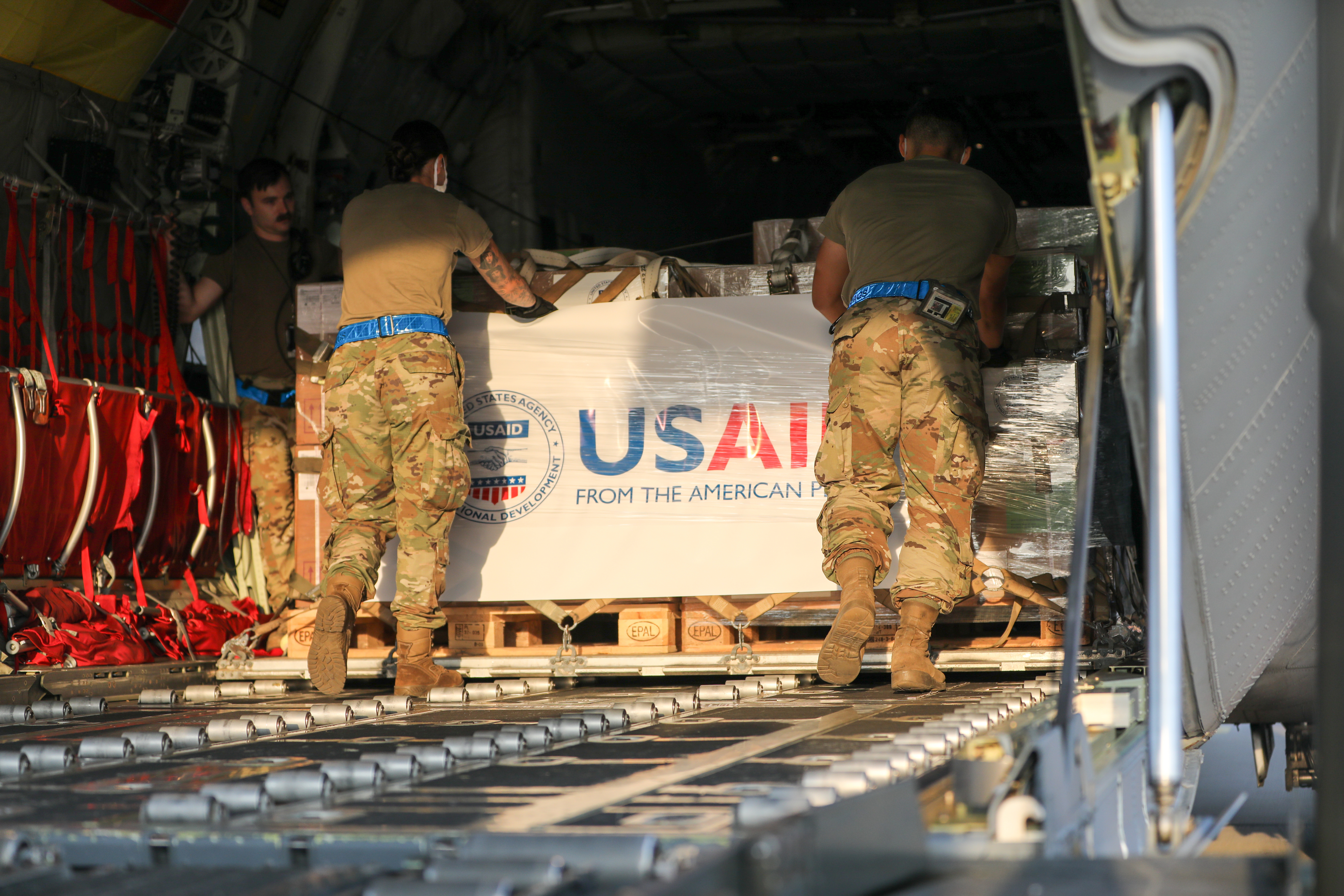
U.S. Army and Air Force service members assisted USAID with the transportation of nearly 12,000 pounds of medical kits from the Netherlands, through Germany and on to Lebanon in August 2020.

In early February 2025, it was reported that the USAID director of security and a deputy were put on administrative leave after they "blocked efforts by DOGE members to physically access restricted areas" in order to obtain sensitive information. The DOGE members eventually gained access to the information, which reportedly included email as well as classified information for which they did not have security clearance. And they obtained the ability to lock USAID staff out. Musk had earlier tweeted "USAID is a criminal organization" and that it is "time for it to die". Estimates do vary. Oxfam criticized Musk's policies and actions as the world's richest individual deciding "to shutter the world's largest provider of lifesaving humanitarian aid".

USAID staff were instructed to keep away from USAID headquarters while hundreds of USAID staff lost access to USAID computer systems.

There have been reports that China has offered to take over development projects if the United States permanently leaves.

During a February 6 press conference, Secretary of State Marco Rubio stated, "If it's providing food or medicine or anything that is saving lives and is immediate and urgent, you're not included in the freeze." However, a February 8 CNN article reported that many waivers were not being acted upon because of staff placed on leave, plus payment systems had been taken over. In an interview before the February 9 Super Bowl, Trump said, "Let him take care of the few good ones", referring to Rubio.

On February 13, federal judge Amir Ali ordered the Trump administration to continue contracts and grants which were in effect January 19. Chief Justice John Roberts, overseeing cases for the District of Columbia, paused this order. On March 5, the Supreme Court ruled 5–4 that the Trump administration must comply with Judge Ali's order. However, the Supreme Court stated that Judge Ali must clarify the payment obligations with "due regard for the feasibility of any compliance timelines". On March 10, Judge Ali ruled that the Trump administration must pay for completed projects at the rate of 300 back payments a day, meaning four days for all 1,200 back payments, and this being for projects completed by February 13. A March 11 ABC News (United States)|ABC News article reported that, until recently, no payments were being made because DOGE had disabled the payment system.

==== Keeping 17% of programs ====
On March 10, Secretary of State Marco Rubio announced that he was cancelling 83% of USAID programs, or approximately 5,200 out of 6,200 programs. The remaining 1,000 programs (approximately) would be moved to the Department of State. As of late March, DOGE no longer lists the details of canceled USAID contracts on its "Wall of Receipts".

DOGE lists approximately $12 billion saved, although a former USAID analyst estimates the actual amount is closer to $6 or $7 billion.

In early April, USAID announced it was adding back 14 nations to grants under the UN's World Food Programme. These nations include Lebanon, Syria, Somalia, Jordan, Iraq and Ecuador, plus the International Organization for Migration in the Pacific region. However, food aid was not restored to either Yemen or Afghanistan, with a State Department spokesperson saying this was "based on concern that the funding was benefiting terrorist groups, including the Houthis and the Taliban".

==== July 2025 rescissions ("claw backs"), but not for PEPFAR ====
In June 2025, the White House requested that Congress pass a package of rescissions, or "claw backs", of approximately $8 billion in foreign aid and $1 billion for the Corporation for Public Broadcasting including NPR and PBS.

The House of Representatives passed the cuts as requested. The Senate excluded the PEPFAR cuts, which is the program started in 2003 during the presidency of George W Bush to help provide HIV medicines to lower-income countries. The Senate passed two preliminary votes in close 51-50 fashion with Vice President JD Vance casting the tie-breaking votes. A rescission is one of the exceptions to the Senate's 60-vote filibuster rule.

President Trump focused on the public broadcasting aspect, criticizing CNN and also "MSDNC" which is a mix of MSNBC and DNC (Democratic National Committee). In a Truth Social post, he wrote, "It is very important that all Republicans adhere to my Recissions Bill and, in particular, DEFUND THE CORPORATION FOR PUBLIC BROADCASTING (PBS and NPR), which is worse than CNN & MSDNC put together."

In a late night session at 2:00 AM on July 17, the Senate voted 51–48 in favor of the cuts. Later that same day, the House of Representatives voted 216 - 213 for the Senate version, meaning PEPFAR was protected in the amount of $400 million. Regarding the cuts to public broadcasting, service to rural areas became one of the political issues.

=== Disaster response ===
==== Myanmar earthquake, March 2025 ====
President Trump stated the United States would help in response to the March 28 earthquake in Myanmar, although the question was asked by a former USAID executive of whether or not the United States will beat other countries in getting there with a relief team(s).

==== Hurricane Melissa, October 2025 ====
Hurricane Melissa was a Category 5 hurricane which first made landfall at Jamaica on October 28, 2025, and then hit other Caribbean islands. Secretary of State Rubio activated a disaster assistance response team. By October 31, three U.S. CH-47 Chinook helicopters were deployed to Jamaica to help with relief efforts, with five more on the way. In early November, the State Department promised $12 million in aid to Jamaica, $8 million to Haiti, $3 million to Cuba, and $500,000 to The Bahamas.

=== Refugees ===
On January 20, 2025, Trump signed the executive order named "Securing Our Borders". This order suspends the Uniting for Ukraine parole program, and no new applications from Ukrainian refugees with relatives in the United States are being accepted.

On May 12, 59 white South African refugees arrived from South Africa. The Trump administration has been criticized for fast-tracking their applications while pausing other refugee programs.

The Trump administration slowed the entry of Afghan refugees into the U.S., including persons who had fought on the U.S. side against the Taliban. A leader of an American veterans group said, "these pilots risked everything for America. Their lives are now on the line because of our failure to follow through on our promises."

On May 12, Department of Homeland Security Secretary Noem announced that TPS, or Temporary Protected Status, for Afghan refugees would be ended in 60 days, which is the shortest time period permitted by United States law. This decision cited improved conditions in Afghanistan.

The Hill reports that the UN high commissioner for refugees has stated that the situation in Afghanistan has not improved, with a report stating "The large-scale returns are putting even greater pressure on already stretched humanitarian resources." On the other hand, Secretary Noem has pointed to an increase in tourists from China and a drop in the number of Afghans needing assistance from 29 million to 24 million.

Fox News reported that the leader of "Afghans for Trump", which formed in the aftermath of President Biden's chaotic 2021 withdrawal from Afghanistan, claimed that conditions have not significantly improved and urged President Trump to reconsider.

=== Expansionism and revanchism ===
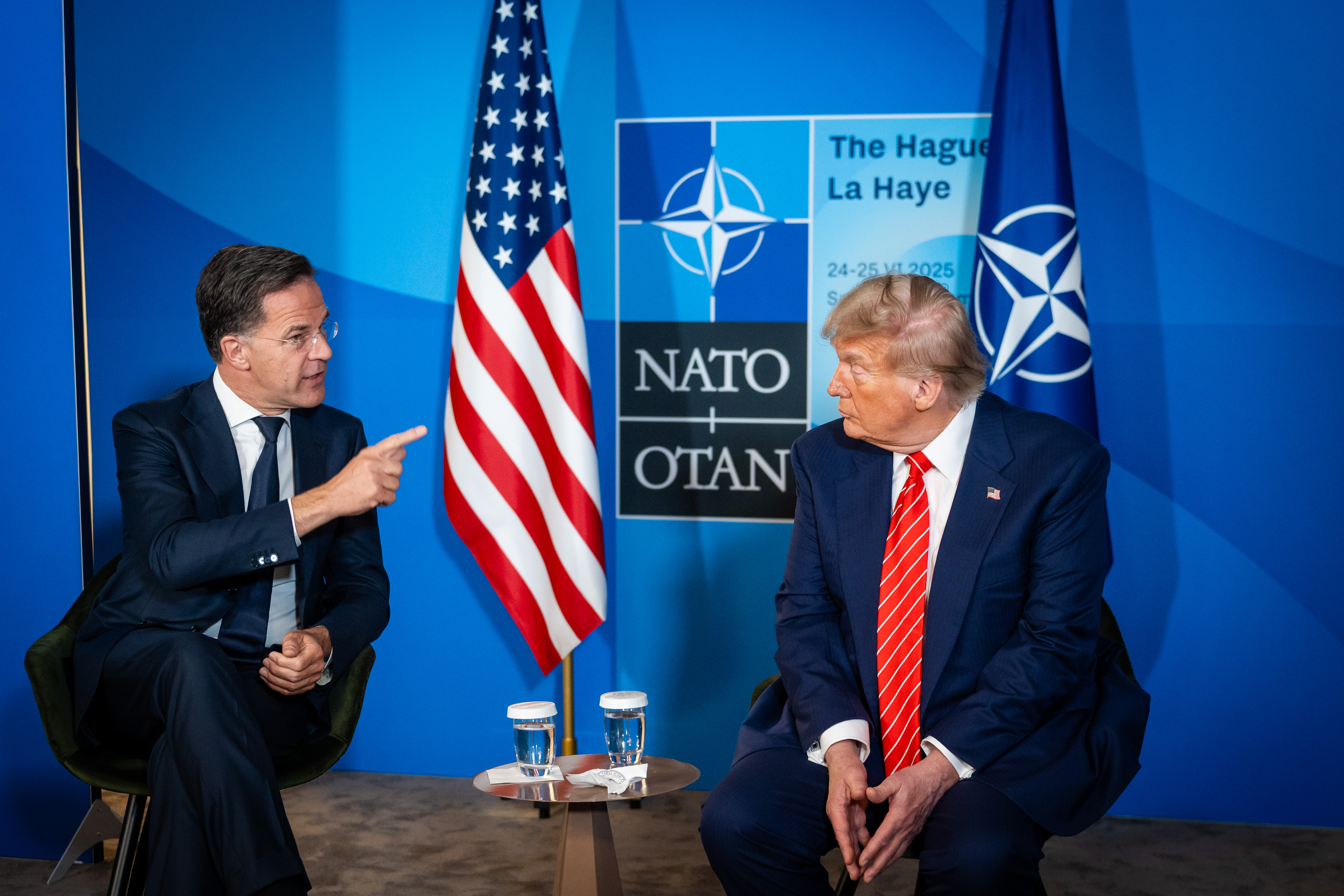
Trump with NATO general secretary Mark Rutte at the 2025 The Hague NATO summit

In the lead-up to his second inauguration, Trump proposed plans and ideas that would expand the United States' political influence and territory. It has been characterized as a revival of the Monroe Doctrine. The last territory acquired by the United States was in 1947 when the Mariana, Caroline, and Marshall Islands were acquired.

==== Canada ====
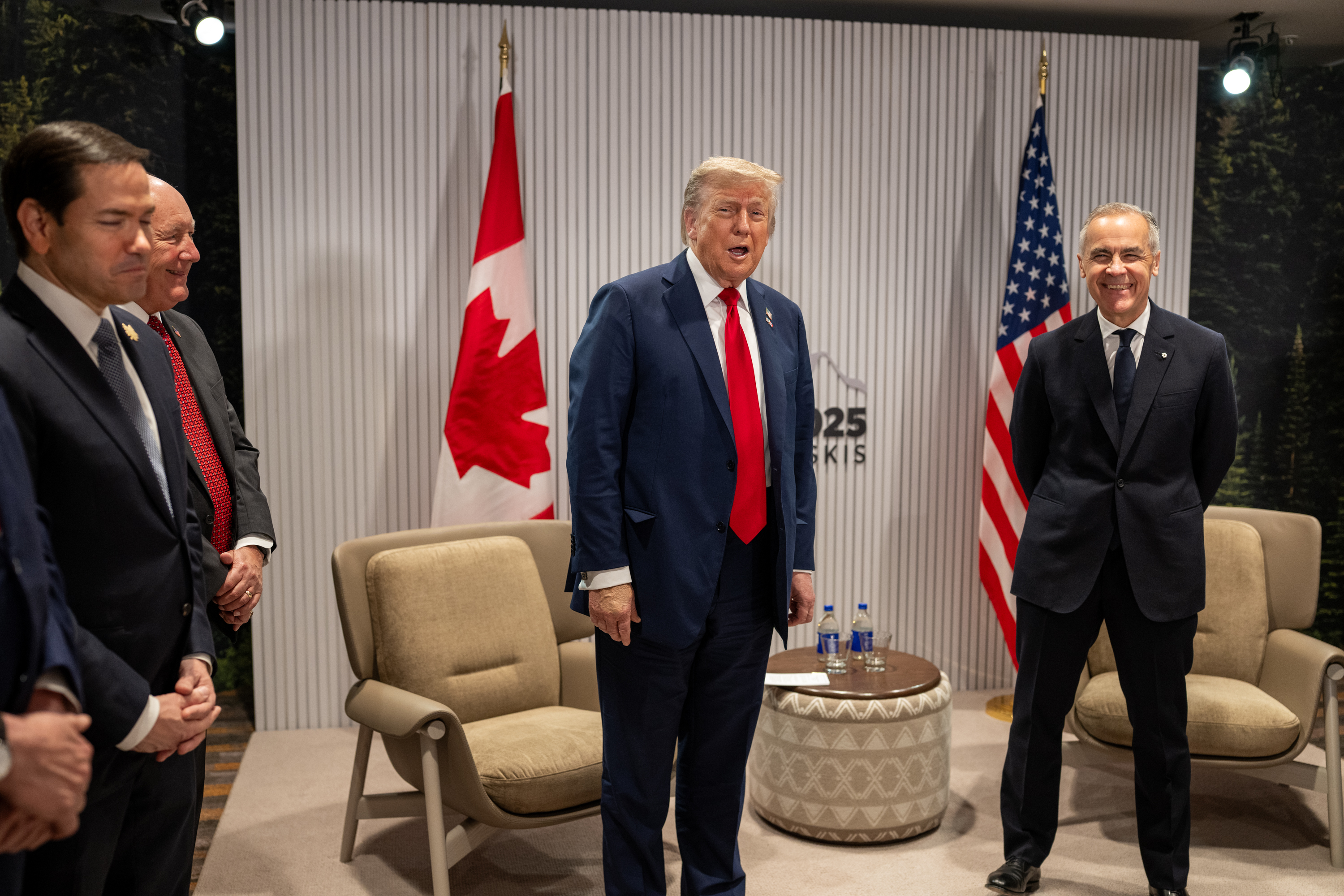
Trump with Canadian prime minister Mark Carney, June 2025

The Trump administration has imposed 25% tariffs on Canadian goods imports that do not fall under Canada–United States–Mexico Agreement, with exceptions for steel, aluminum, and Canadian-made passenger vehicle content. Canadian officials responded with retaliatory 25% tariffs, and have even proposed cutting off the supply of Canadian energy into the Northern United States. Manitoba has diverted energy to Canada that it previously supplied to the USA. Peter Navarro, a trade envoy and high-ranking Trump official, has suggested expelling Canada from the Five Eyes intelligence alliance to increase pressure in the trade war.

Trump has repeatedly stated his desire for the United States to annex Canada and calling for it to become the 51st state, calling then-Canadian prime minister Justin Trudeau "Governor of the Great State of Canada". Trudeau stated to business leaders in Canada that he believes the annexation threats are a "real thing". The strained relations have led to a "Buy Canadian" movement to boycott American goods and services, and booing the American national anthem during international hockey games. When tariffs were implemented on March 4, Trudeau stated that Trump's goal in the trade war was to weaken Canada in order to annex it.

On February 8, 2026, Trump threatened to block the opening of the Gordie Howe International Bridge, citing Canada's recent trade developments with China and the alleged one-sided nature of the contract (wherein Canada gains all revenue from bridge tolls to pay back construction costs). Trump said the bridge's opening will be delayed until multiple trade and bridge related grievances were resolved. Trump's announcement was criticised by politicians, business leaders and industry groups.

On February 12, 2026, the United States House of Representatives voted to repeal the tariffs that had been imposed on Canadian goods during Donald Trump's administration. The resolution passed by a 219–211 vote, with a small number of Republican lawmakers joining nearly all Democrats in support. The tariffs had originally been enacted under a national emergency declaration in February 2025, and their repeal represented a rare bipartisan rebuke of Trump's trade policy. Following the vote, President Trump reportedly threatened political consequences for Republicans who voted against the measure. While passage in the House reflects congressional concern over the tariffs, actual repeal would still require Senate approval and presidential assent, and was expected to face a potential veto.

==== Greenland ====
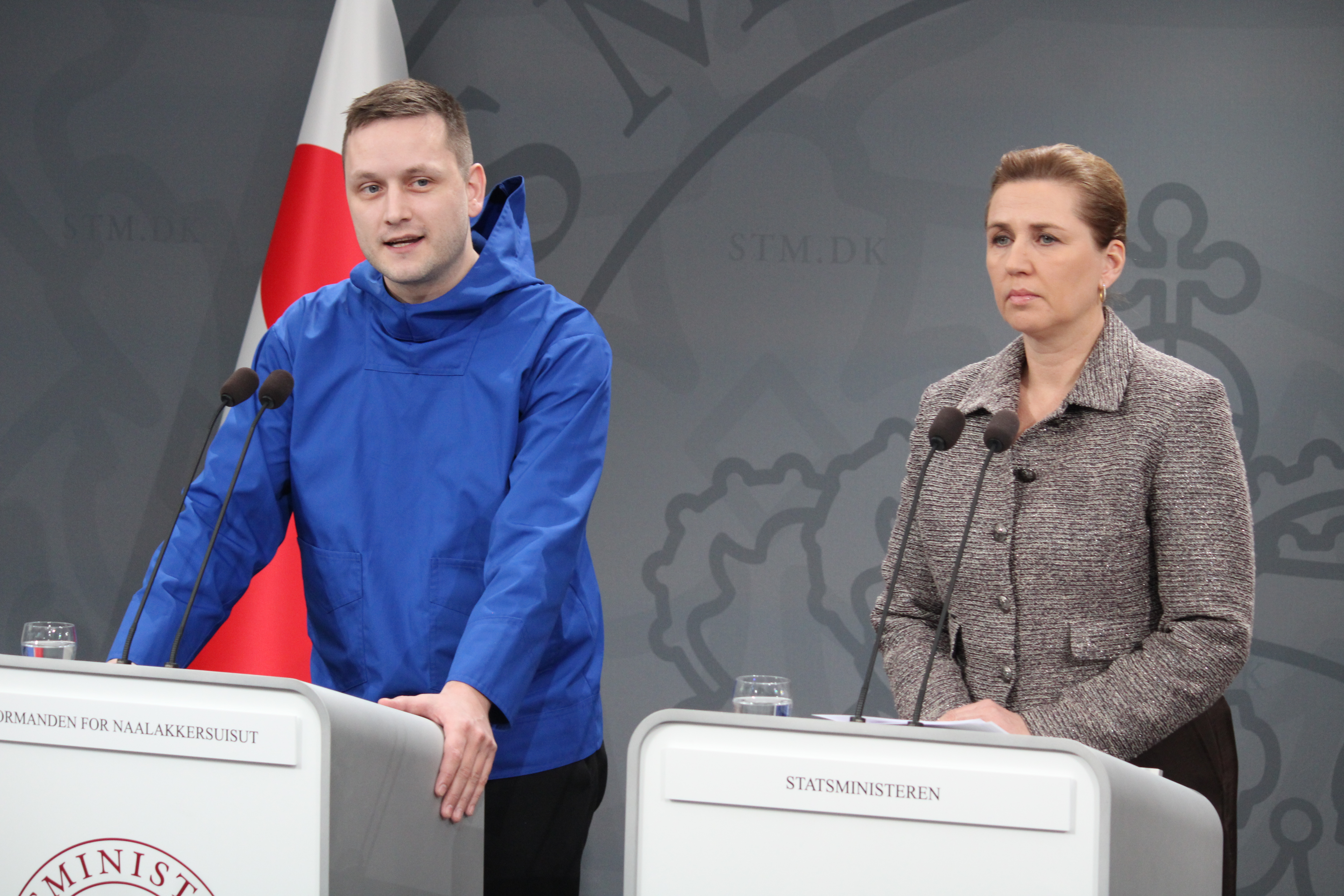
Greenlandic leader Jens Frederik-Nielsen announcing "We choose Denmark" at a January 2026 press conference with Mette Frederiksen in response to Trump's threats to invade or annex the country

In December 2024, Trump stated a further proposal for the United States to purchase Greenland from Denmark, describing "ownership" and control of the island as "an absolute necessity" for national security purposes. This builds upon a prior offer from Trump to buy Greenland during his first term, which the Danish Realm refused, causing him to cancel his August 2019 visit to Denmark. On January 7, 2025, Trump's son Donald Trump Jr. visited Greenland's capital city Nuuk alongside Charlie Kirk to hand out MAGA hats. At a press conference the following day, Trump refused to rule out military or economic force to take over Greenland or the Panama Canal. However, he did rule out military force in taking over Canada. On January 14, the Trump-affiliated Nelk Boys also visited Nuuk, handing out dollar bills to locals. On January 16, the CEOs of major Danish companies Novo Nordisk, Vestas and Carlsberg among others were assembled for a crisis meeting in the Ministry of State to discuss the situation.

On the subsequent day, former chief executive Friis Arne Petersen in the Danish Ministry of Foreign Affairs described the situation as "historically unheard of", while Noa Redington, special adviser to former prime minister Helle Thorning-Schmidt, compared the international pressure on Denmark that during the 2005 Jyllands-Posten Muhammad cartoons controversy. On February 12, 2025, a bill was introduced in Congress to advance efforts to acquire Greenland and rename it Red, White, and Blueland. Trump's actions against Greenland have been described as hybrid warfare by academics and analysts. Prime Minister Mette Frederiksen said that "the Kingdom of Denmark—and thus Greenland—is a member of NATO and is therefore covered by the Alliance's collective security guarantee ... I ... strongly urge the United States to cease its threats against a historically close ally." The official Danish threat assessment published by the Danish Defence Intelligence Service in 2025 for the first time mentioned the United States as a threat to national security, alongside Russia and China. In 2026 Greenland and Denmark saw massive anti-Trump protests, the Hands off Greenland protests, where protesters chanted "Greenland is not for sale".

==== Panama Canal ====
In 2024, Trump demanded that Panama return control of the Panama Canal to the United States because "excessive rates" were being charged for American passage. The United States previously was in control of the Panama Canal Zone from 1903 until 1999, and has invaded Panama before in 1989. Trump told Congress in March 2025 that his administration "will be reclaiming the Panama Canal". Also that month, Defense Secretary Pete Hegseth instructed the Trump administration to "immediately" present "credible military options to ensure fair and unfettered US military and commercial access to the Panama Canal".

=== United Nations ===
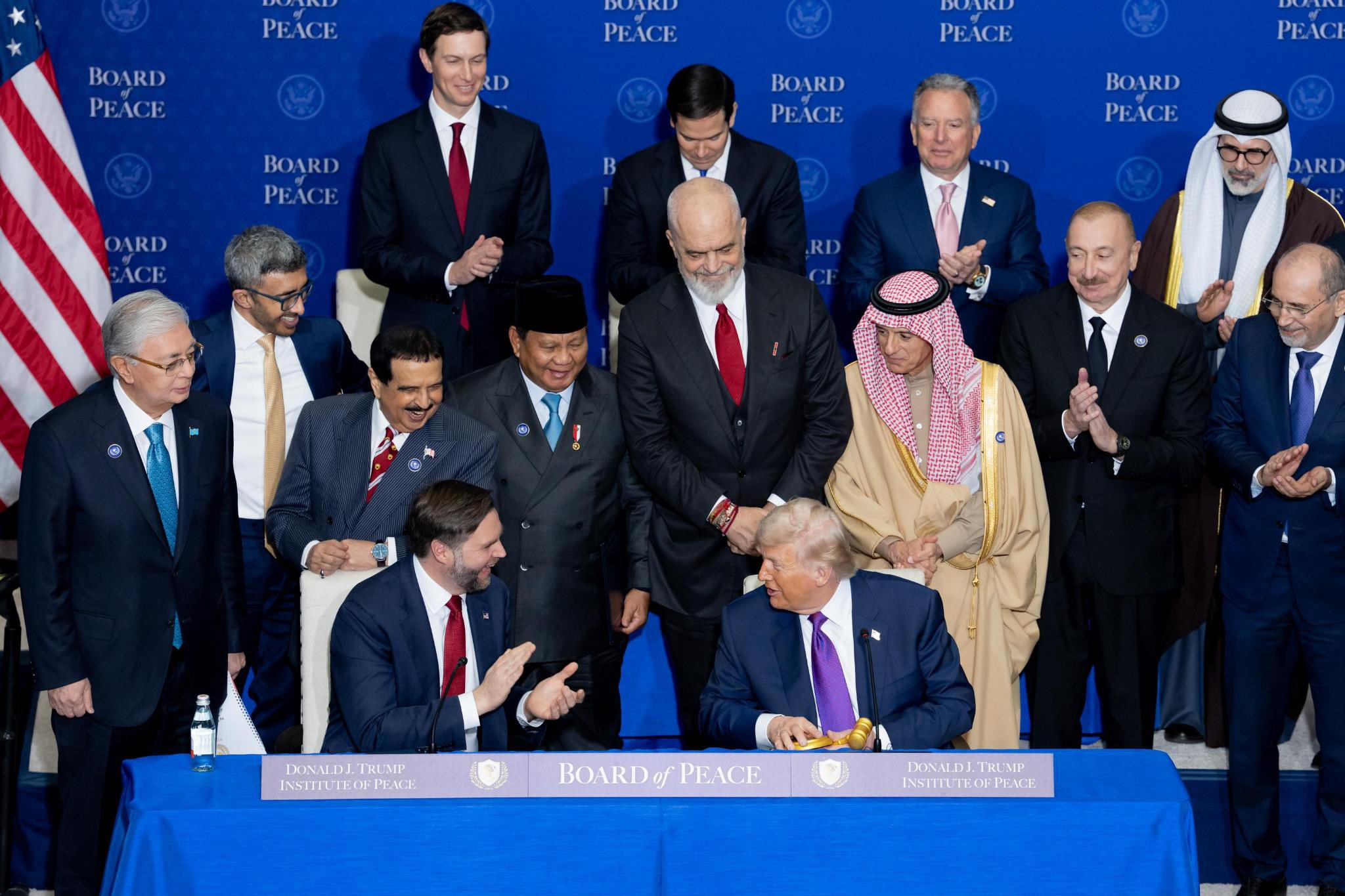
Trump and other leaders during the Board of Peace meeting in Davos, Switzerland, February 2026

On July 22, 2025, the United States informed of its decision to withdraw from UNESCO, effective December 31, 2026.

In a presidential memorandum issued on January 7, 2026, Donald Trump directed to start the process of withdrawal of the US from the 66 organizations, agencies and commissions of the United Nations, including UN Framework Convention on Climate Change (UNFCCC), calling them "contrary to the interests of the United States".

==== World Health Organization ====
On January 22, 2026, President Donald Trump completed the withdrawal of the United States from the World Health Organization (WHO), a specialized agency of the United Nations, a year after he signed Executive Order 14155 on January 20, 2025. As announced by the Department of Health and Human Services, the United States officially exited the organization, ending its 78-year membership and halting all U.S. funding and participation in the WHO's governance and activities. Although the organization hoped for a reconsideration the day after Trump's executive order, the administration continued with the decision.

The administration justified the withdrawal by citing concerns about the WHO's handling of global health emergencies, including the COVID-19 pandemic, its resistance to reforms, and its failure to operate independently from inappropriate political influence of other WHO member states. In a joint statement by Secretary of State Marco Rubio and Secretary of Health and Human Services Robert F. Kennedy Jr., they said that the WHO "tarnished and trashed everything that America has done for it" and it "abandoned its core mission and acted repeatedly against the interests of the United States", including the failure to "hand over the American flag that hung in front of it".

The United States still owes outstanding dues to the WHO from 2024 to 2025, raising questions about the legality and financial implications of the exit. Being one of the biggest donors to the WHO, the country's unpaid fees of estimated $260 million has already caused massive job losses at the organization. However, as a response, Washington said they saw no reason to comply.

Ronald G. Nahass, president of the Infectious Diseases Society of America (IDSA), criticized the withdrawal, calling it "a shortsighted and misguided abandonment of our global health commitments" and "scientifically reckless". He emphasized that "It fails to acknowledge the fundamental natural history of infectious diseases" and that "Global cooperation and communication are critical to keep our own citizens protected because germs do not respect borders," adding that global cooperation is "not a luxury" but a "biological necessity".

== Ethics ==
=== Corruption allegations ===
A Flamingo Revolution protest in Tirana on June 14, 2026, against the Albanian government's approval of Jared Kushner's luxury real estate projects.

Trump's second presidency has faced unprecedented conflicts of interest, self-enrichment, and allegations of corruption unrivaled in American history from historians, legal experts, and federal judges.

His administration has faced widespread allegations of insider trading and raised conflict of interest concerns due to business dealings by Trump's son-in-law Jared Kushner and his cabinet. Trump's grants of pardons and clemency have favored political allies and loyalists, with several given after millions in donations or fees. Trump has proactively solicited donations from companies and individuals following which favorable regulatory actions and decisions have occurred. Trump has maintained an active stock market account with thousands of trades totaling hundreds of millions of dollars. Trump has directly benefited by soliciting his own memecoin $TRUMP and benefitted from his family's cryptocurrency company World Liberty Financial which has received investments by anonymous individuals and foreign governments. As of his July 2026 financial report, Trump made over $2.2B in 2025 compared to $622M in 2024, of which $1.4B came from his family's cryptocurrency business. Trump has received an unusually large number of expensive gifts, such as a $400M jet from Qatar or gold bars, which some scholars view as a violation of the emoluments clause of the Constitution.

Trump's second term has been described by political commentators as having fewer prohibitions on business activity and guardrails against potential conflicts of interest than his first, and for having more opportunities to directly influence Trump. Trump repealed and rolled back anti-corruption measures and ethical standards for himself and his allies, dropped corruption charges against political figures with ties to him, and fired inspectors general investigating fraud and abuse. The New York Times described Trump as making up statistics "out of thin air", and for accusing government agencies and "anyone he disfavors of corruption and even criminality without proof". His second presidency was described as breaking with decades of ethical norms, and raising substantial corruption concerns. Congressional Republicans have largely downplayed or ignored the concerns.

Federal judges found many of the administration's actions to be illegal and unconstitutional, and by mid-July, a Washington Post analysis found he defied judges and the courts in roughly one third of all cases against him, actions which were described by legal experts as unprecedented for any presidential administration. His defiance of court orders and a claimed right to disobey the courts raised fears among legal experts of a constitutional crisis. An August 2026 Reuters/Ipsos poll found a majority of Americans believe that Trump and his family "have inappropriately profited from cryptocurrency since his return to power and that his policy decisions are influenced by his private business dealings".

=== Alleged conflict of interest ===
Trump with Elon Musk, Jensen Huang, and Saudi crown prince Mohammed bin Salman at the U.S.-Saudi Investment Forum at the Kennedy Center in Washington, D.C., November 19, 2025

In September 2026, a Powerus delegation met General Asim Munir and a MoU was signed between the Pakistan Army and the Trump-family backed drone maker while the company was due to merge with Aureus Greenway Holdings linked to Eric Trump and Donald Trump Jr. However, Andrew Fox, Powerus' founder, denied that "the company's growth was linked to the involvement of Trump's sons."

=== Pardons and commutations ===
As of November 2025 Trump had issued nearly two thousand pardons and commutations including for some prosecuted during his first presidency. His grant of pardons outpaced those of prior presidents. Trump's pardons and grants of clemency favored political allies and loyalists. Lobbyists have told the Wall Street Journal and other news outlets that fees of $1M are standard. Some would-be pardon recipients have offered success fees of $6M for a successful application.

Trump frequently bypassed the Office of the Pardon Attorney, and on March 7, 2025, fired its leader, Department of Justice career attorney Liz Oyer, and installed political loyalist Ed Martin in the role. Ed Martin described the rationale for granting pardons as "No MAGA left behind". In April 2025, Oyer testified to the Senate and accused the Justice Department of "ongoing corruption" and that "the leadership of the Department of Justice appears to value political loyalty above the fair and responsible administration of justice". In 2025, Trump pardoned 42 people charged with white-collar crimes. As of late January 2026, he had pardoned an additional 10 white collar criminals. In April 2026, The Wall Street Journal reported that Trump "repeatedly promised his top administration officials pardons before he leaves office". In June 2026, a Reuters investigation found 96% of clemency grants failed to meet longstanding Department of Justice guidelines for such requests, that they were based on partisan and personal criteria, and that there was evidence of payments being used to solicit them.

Trump was the first president in modern American history to issue pardons for businesses, and by July 2026 had issued nine and wiped out $200 million in penalties, some of which was destined for victims of wrongdoing. Bloomberg highlighted the case of HDR Global Trading, which owned crypto platform BitMEX and was the first company pardoned instead of a natural person. On January 15, 2025, BitMEX was fined $100 million for violating anti-money laundering laws after pleading guilty in July 2024. That month, the exchange launched a swap listing tied to the $TRUMP memecoin and its founder penned an essay which Bloomberg described as "framing the president's embrace of meme coins as a move toward bolstering political accountability". On March 27, 2025, Trump signed pardons for four BitMEX executives and pardoned the company the same week the $100 million fine was due.

=== Branding of institutions ===
Trump, long known before he took elective office for labeling his companies' properties and merchandise with his name or image, has controversially continued the practice in public life in his second presidential term, in some cases by altering existing names or images.

Soon after the term began, Trump's portrait appeared on large banners hung from three federal buildings in Washington, D.C.; U.S. Sen. Adam Schiff (D.-Calif.) objected that the banners violated "a longstanding legal prohibition against the use of federal funds for propaganda and self-aggrandizement purposes". Trump also promptly dismissed the Kennedy Center's board of trustees, then selected a replacement board, which voted in December to rename the center the Donald J. Trump and the John F. Kennedy Memorial Center for the Performing Arts; its signage was altered to reflect the new name. The change drew criticism from politicians in Congress, some of them in Trump's own party; House minority leader Hakeem Jeffries (D-N.Y.) declared that the board had "no authority to actually rename the Kennedy Center in the absence of legislative action", and a federal judge later ordered that Trump's name be removed. The new board had appointed Trump himself to its chairmanship, a first for a president. That month, Trump also set his name on the U.S. Institute of Peace (USIP), renaming it the Donald J. Trump Institute of Peace, and its signage, too, was so altered. Trump had recently fired not only the USIP's board but its every employee, turning control of its headquarters over to the General Services Administration. Trump further announced that month a plan for a new fleet of naval vessels, to be called Trump-class battleships, although battleships have long been obsolete in naval warfare and the Navy's last one in service was decommissioned in 1992.

For many years, the National Park Service's annual general pass depicted natural landscapes, but the new 2026 pass design for U.S. residents has a photo of Donald Trump. The redesign triggered a popular backlash of passholders' covering his photo with stickers; the Park Service responded by updating its ban on defaced passes to include anything obscuring the front. The year also marked the Treasury's announcement that Trump's own signature would replace that of the treasurer on paper currency, another first for a president; the State Department's issuance of a new passport design with a portrait of Trump, the first living president to appear on a U.S. passport, offered as an option to in-person applicants at the Washington, D.C., Passport Agency; and Florida Gov. Ron DeSantis's consent to renaming Palm Beach International Airport after Trump, a change the president had reportedly sought in 2020. Other measures bearing Trump's name are Trump accounts, tax-advantaged investment accounts for American minors rolled out as part of the One Big Beautiful Bill Act; TrumpRx, a prescription drug website run by the federal government; and the Trump Gold Card, a program offering foreign nationals expedited U.S. residency in exchange for donations of $1 million or more to the Commerce Department and denounced by U.S. Sen. Dick Durbin (D.-Ill.) as illegal.

== Authoritarian drift ==
In September 2025, Trump announced a widespread crackdown on left-wing groups and donors, saying that "the radicals on the left are the problem" with political violence. However, cumulatively over decades, most extremist killings in the US have been caused by right-wing perpetrators.

=== Government targeting of political opponents and civil society ===
During Donald Trump's second presidency, the Trump administration has undertaken a series of actions using the government to target his political opponents and civil society. News outlets described his actions as part of his promised "retribution" and "revenge" campaign, within the context of a strongly personalist and leader-centered conception of politics. During his 2024 presidential campaign, Trump repeatedly stated that he had "every right" to go after his political opponents.

He undertook a massive expansion of presidential power under a maximalist interpretation of the unitary executive theory. Several of his actions ignored or violated federal laws, regulations, and the Constitution according to American legal scholars, the Government Accountability Office, and federal judges. He threatened, signed executive actions against, and ordered investigations into his political opponents, his critics, and organizations aligned with the Democratic Party. He politicized the civil service, undertaking mass layoffs of government employees to recruit workers more loyal to himself. He ended the post-Watergate norm of Justice Department independence, weaponizing it and ordering it to target his political enemies. He utilized several government agencies to retaliate against his political enemies and continued filing personal lawsuits against his political opponents, companies, and news organizations that angered him.

By July 2025, Trump had extracted more than $1.2 billion in settlements in a "cultural crackdown" against a variety of institutions that largely chose to settle rather than fight back. He engaged in an unprecedented targeting of law firms and lawyers that previously represented positions adverse to himself. Trump targeted higher education by demanding it give federal oversight of curriculum and targeted activists, legal immigrants, tourists, and students with visas who expressed criticism of his policies or engaged in pro-Palestinian advocacy. He also detained and deported United States citizens.

Trump's actions against civil society have been described by legal experts and political scientists as authoritarian and contributing to democratic backsliding, as well as negatively impacting freedom of the press, free speech, and the rule of law.

In February 2026, during his State of the Union address to Congress, Trump was publicly criticized by Representatives Ilhan Omar and Rashida Tlaib, who challenged his immigration policies and accused his administration of harming U.S. citizens. In response, Trump posted on his social media platform Truth Social, suggesting that the lawmakers "should be sent back from where they came". Omar, a naturalized U.S. citizen born in Somalia, and Tlaib, a U.S.-born citizen of Palestinian descent, were both widely reported to have been the focus of these remarks. Media outlets and civil rights organizations described Trump's comments as xenophobic and controversial, drawing bipartisan criticism for targeting members of Congress based on their heritage.

=== Flood-the-zone strategy ===
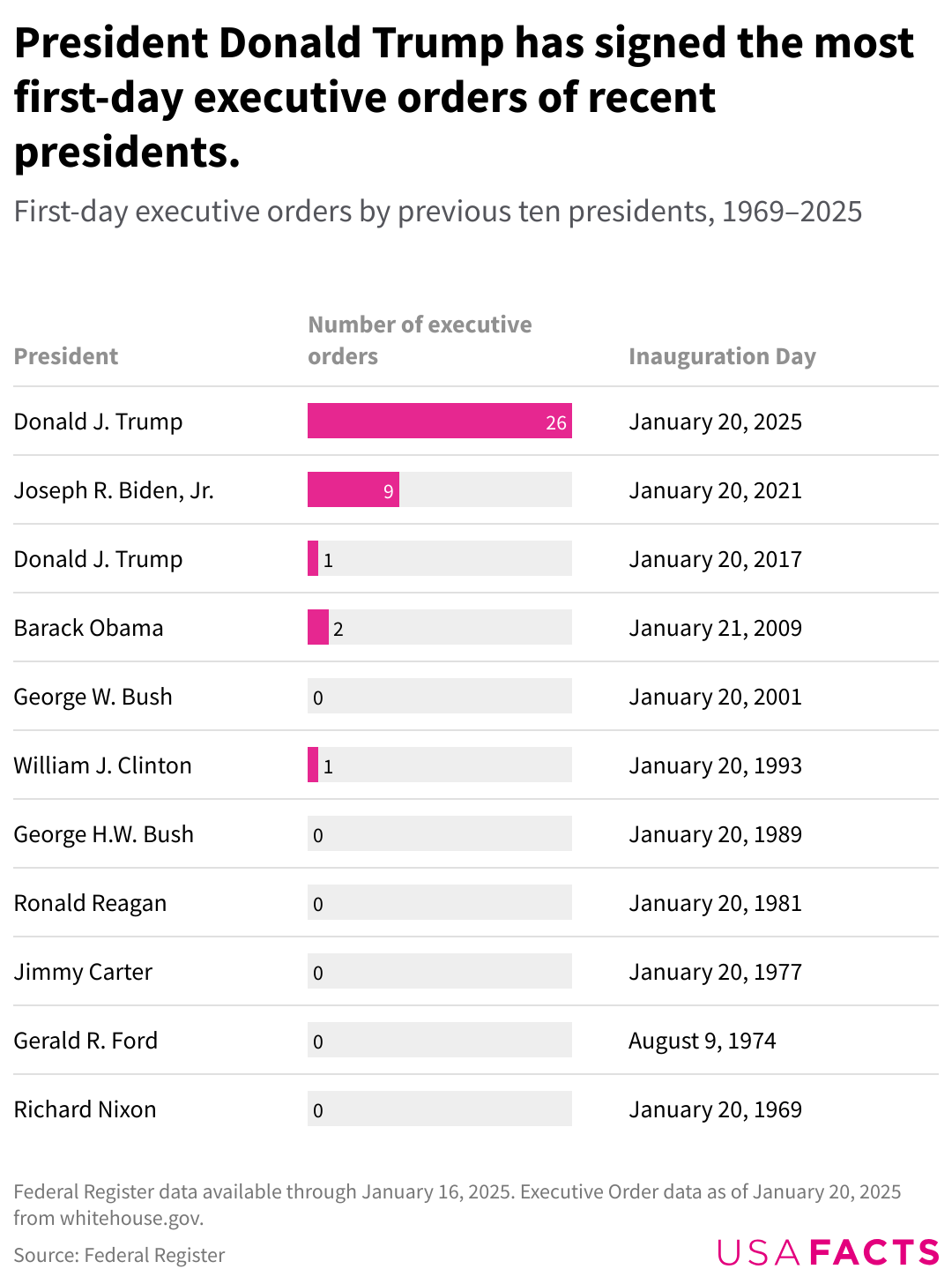
Comparisons between numbers of first-day executive orders

The beginning of Trump's second presidency is largely recognized as the one theorized by political strategist Steve Bannon during Trump's first presidency, here deployed by Stephen Miller. The strategy consists of "flood[ing] the zone of shit", with an impressive number of claims and executive orders with the intent to tire journalists, political opponents and judicial institutions. As such the latter can't react rapidly and appropriately enough, and it nips controversies in the bud because of the flood of information. The administration had already prepared diverse executive orders to allow the signing of 55 executive orders in 20 days, a frequency never before seen.

=== Concentration of executive power ===
A month after the beginning of the presidency, the government had been sued 200 times for "executive overreach", which the administration lost for the most part. On Twitter, Trump justified his policies by quoting Napoleon: "He who saves his Country does not violate any Law". In reaction, the American left accused him of acting as a dictator.

The right-wing and left-wing media both claim that their policies allowed a hitherto concentration of executive power in US history. Experts and newspapers feared a constitutional crisis because of frequent checks and balances breaches. The Trump administration often questioned the legitimacy of judges blocking his executive orders.

According to The New Yorker, Trump's new governance based itself on unconditional loyalty towards himself. Trump allegedly implemented a climate where any criticism even among the Republicans is sanctioned. Figures like Jack Posobiec and Laura Loomer acted as ideological safeguards by listing potential dissidents among the party.

The administrations openly wanted to concentrate political powers within Trump's hands. They justify it with the unitary executive theory, alleging that by having been elected and with the approval of the Constitution, Trump is warranted in having unchecked and absolute power on the judicial branch, and on politics in general. Legal expert Julien Jeanneney argued that the "unconstitutional" policies of Trump are backed by the Supreme Court, of which a third of the judges had been appointed by Trump during his first presidency, hence making Republican judges the majority. According to Jeanneney most of the judges "seem clearly on Trump's side concerning most of his policies, even when they violate the Court's long-lived principles".

Numerous experts of fascism and historians (Jason Stanley, Marci Shore, Timothy Snyder, Johann Chapoutot, Paul Lerner, Anne Berg, Diana Garvin, Tiffany Florvil, Claudia Koonz, Asma Mhalla, and Ben Worthy) denounced the authoritarianism of the presidency, which they explicitly linked to fascism. However experts Christopher R. Browning, Roger Griffin, Janos Bourgeois, Lloyd Cox and Brendon O'Connor contested this comparison, although Browning noted "uncanny resemblances" between Trump and Hitler, and Cox and O'Connor talked about "proto-fascist phenomenon".

=== Academic evaluations ===
The V-Dem Institute said in 2026 regarding Trump's presidency that "the speed with which American democracy is currently dismantled is unprecedented in modern history". The institute noted executive overreach undermining the rule of law, suppression and intimidation of media and dissenting voices, loss of legislative constraints, and declining civil rights, equality, and freedom of expression.

Beginning in October 2025, The New York Times editorial board published an Autocracy Index showing erosion of US democracy using various benchmarks, offering "a way to understand how much Mr. Trump is eroding American democracy" since his January 2025 inauguration.

Professor Christina Pagel mapped the first actions of the Trump administration in a Venn diagram that identifies "five broad domains that correspond to features of proto-authoritarian states". These five domains are: undermining democratic institutions and the rule of law, dismantling federal government; dismantling social protections and rights, enrichment and corruption; suppressing dissent and controlling information; attacking science, environment, health, arts and education, particularly universities; aggressive foreign policy and global destabilization. The journalist Martin Sandu and the authoritarian politics researcher Alex Norris described the maximalist interpretation of executive power in Trump's second term as president, including sweeping executive orders, the federal funding freeze, actions against political opponents and the media, pardons of those involved in the January 6 Capitol attack, the actions of Elon Musk's Department of Government Efficiency, and the like as an attempted self-coup. The political scientist Lee Morgenbesser argued the actions of DOGE are a form of state capture.

== Elections during the second Trump presidency ==
Congressional party leaders
		Senate leaders		House leaders	
Congress	Year	Majority	Minority	Speaker	Minority
119th	2025–2026	Thune	Schumer	Johnson	Jeffries
120th	2027–present	TBD	Thune	TBD	Jordan

Republican seats in Congress
Congress	Senate	House
119th (Note: 17 days of the 119th Congress (January 3, 2025 – January 19, 2025) took place under President Biden.)	53	220
120th	44	173~175

=== 2026 midterm elections ===
In the 2026 mid-term elections, Democrats had another blue wave, winning control of the House and the Senate.

== Internal Republican politics ==
=== MAGA fallout over non-release of Jeffrey Epstein files ===
On July 7, 2025, the FBI issued a two-page statement saying they had concluded that infamous sex offender Jeffrey Epstein did not possess a "client list", even though Attorney General Pam Bondi had hinted in February that such a document was on her desk. Several right-wing media personalities were highly critical of the decision. And per mainstream sources, FBI Deputy Director Dan Bongino is considering resigning and had been feuding with Bondi. One of the reasons given for the non-release is the privacy of the victims. At a White House press conference on the same day, President Trump asked a reporter, "Are you still talking about Jeffrey Epstein?"

In late-July 24, several Senator Republicans spoke in favor of releasing the information. Lindsey Graham (Republican-South Carolina) said, "The idea that Trump did something nefarious and Biden sat on it for four years, It's hard to believe. Just put it out. Let people look at it." Josh Hawley (R-Missouri) said, "Anybody who ever met him is going to be mentioned, so I don't think that's a big deal ... but nor is it a reason to withhold the documents." Thom Tillis (R-North Carolina) said, "I'm where I've been every time you always ask me this question. Release the damn files."

On September 3, 2025, at an at large outside press conference on the Capitol steps, legislators were joined by nearly a dozen women who state they had been abused by convicted offender Epstein. Representatives Ro Khanna, a California Democrat, Thomas Massie, a Kentucky Republican and Marjorie Taylor Greene, a Georgia Republican and close ally of Trump, urged the House of Representatives to vote to release the full files. House Republican leaders offered an alternative vote to continue investigation by the House Oversight Committee.

On September 3, President Trump spoke to reporters from the Oval Office, and said that the call for release of files is a "Democrat hoax that never ends". Similarly, CNN states that Democrats have "sought to weaponize the Epstein issue against Trump and the GOP in recent weeks, trying to force votes that would put vulnerable Republicans in difficult positions. But the tone of Wednesday's press conference was far less partisan."

On October 7, Attorney General Bondi testified before the Senate Judiciary Committee and BBC drew five "takeaways" including "3. Bondi keen to focus on crime" and "4. But Democrats focus on Epstein". However, Senator John Kennedy (Republican - Louisiana) repeated comments from Commerce Secretary Howard Lutnick that Epstein was "the greatest blackmailer ever".

On November 12, 2025, the petition to force a House vote for the release of the Epstein files by the Department of Justice secured the final required signature from Democratic Rep. Adelita Grijalva, the latter being sworn in for her position after the end of the October 2025 government shutdown. On the same day, House Democrats released a series of private emails between Epstein, Ghislaine Maxwell, and journalist Michael Wolff. Among them was an email in which Epstein stated that "Trump knew about the girls," though without it being clear that this refers to Epstein's crimes.

On November 18, the Epstein Files Transparency Act cleared the House and Senate with overwhelming majorities, requiring the release of all materials relating to the Epstein investigation within 30 days. This would exclude victims' names, as well as material which depicts sexual abuse. The Justice Department may also withhold any materials whose release would "jeapordise an active federal investigation or ongoing prosecution, provided that such withholding is narrowly tailored and temporary". This fact has drawn concern from certain lawmakers, who argue that recently started, ongoing investigations into Bill Clinton and Larry Summers may delay the release of some materials. The Act also requires the executive branch to provide an unredacted "list of all government officials and politically exposed persons" who are included in the material. CNN has expressed scepticism about this aspect of the Act, arguing in an analysis article that "the administration might play games with whatever discretion it has – say, by releasing information that's politically advantageous but withholding other information using the available justifications."

Trump has reversed course and now states he favors the release of the material. He signed the Epstein Files Transparency Act on November 19, and made a lengthy post on Truth Social which included the claim, "Do not forget – The Biden Administration did not turn over a SINGLE file or page related to Democrat Epstein, nor did they ever even speak about him.

== Public opinion ==
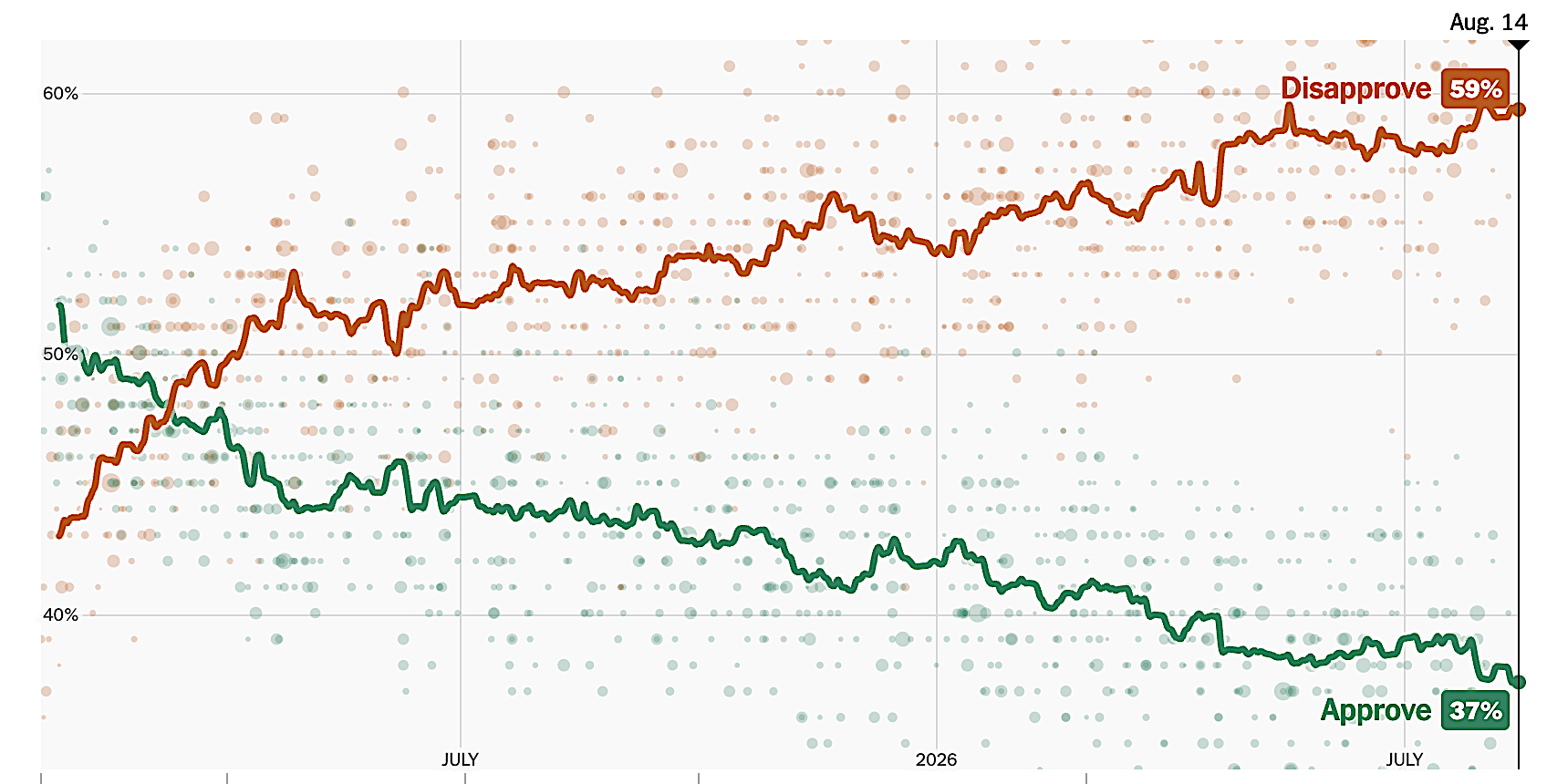
Trump's aggregated presidential approval ratings consistently declined over the first months of his second term, with more disapproval ratings than approval ratings just two months after the 2024 election and disapproval ratings rising to over 50% after three months.

In a larger context, Trump's approval rating (Gallup polling) after the first year of his second term was the lowest of any president since 1977.

Donald Trump began his second term with another historically low job approval rating, only improving on his lowest-ever rating (occurring in his first term) by three percentage points. President Trump began his first term at 45% job approval, and his second with 47%. According to Gallup, "Trump remains the only elected president with sub-50% initial approval ratings". In a CBS News/YouGov poll conducted from February 5–7, 2025, Trump reached a career high poll rating of 53%. According to ABC News, Trump's approval rating at the end of his first 100 days in office was 39%, even lower than his already low 42% approval rating at the end of his first 100 days of his first presidency and the worst of any president's approval ratings after their 100 days in 80 years. By July 2025, Gallup found Trump's approval rating reached the lowest for his second term at 37%, largely driven by declining support from independents, and in August, multiple surveys revealed record or near-record low job approval ratings, which Gallup found to be lower than any modern president.

In May 2026, a Washington Post–ABC News–Ipsos poll reported declining approval of Trump's leadership, with respondents expressing dissatisfaction over issues including the Iran war and economic policy. Separately, Navigator Research polling indicated that around one in five voters who supported Donald Trump in the 2024 United States presidential election expressed regret over their vote. In the 2026 midterm elections, Republicans lost control of both chambers of Congress.

=== Immigration enforcement and protests against ICE ===
In early June 2025 in response to street protests against ICE actions, President Trump activated and sent 2,100 members of the California National Guard to the Los Angeles area. Reuters reported that the protests were the strongest domestic backlash to Trump since he took office in January, and became a focal point in a national debate over immigration, protest, the use of federal force in domestic affairs, the boundaries of presidential power, and freedom of speech and assembly.

=== June 2025 military parade and "No Kings" protests ===
On June 14, the Trump administration held the U.S. Army 250th Anniversary Parade in Washington, D.C., to celebrate the 250th anniversary of the U.S. Army. The parade is estimated to have cost somewhere between $25 and $45 million. In protest, 50501, Indivisible, and other organizations organized No Kings protests in many American cities. Millions attended what was then the largest protest since Trump was re-elected.

Two follow up No Kings protests (also referred to as No Kings 2 and No Kings 3) took place across the United States and cities abroad in October 2025 and March 2026. The October protests took place in some 2,700 locations across the country, and drew an estimated 7 million attendees, The March 2026 protests, held in response to the killings of Alex Pretti and Renée Good, as well as the 2026 Minnesota general strike, drew even more participants. The organizers claim the No Kings 3 protests took place in 3,300 locations and drew an estimated eight to nine million protestors, which would make it the largest single-day protest in American history.

=== May 2026 polling data ===
According to a national poll conducted by the Marquette Law School between May 20 and 26, 2026, Donald Trump's approval rating fell to 38 percent. The poll shows that voters' satisfaction with how Trump is handling the economy has dropped to 30 percent, while satisfaction with his performance on managing inflation and the cost of living stands at 22 percent. Satisfaction with gasoline prices fell to 19 percent, with 95 percent of respondents believing that gasoline prices have increased. 18 percent say the United States has achieved its goals in the Iran war, and a 28 percent consider the war to have been worth its costs.

== See also ==
- Bibliography of Donald Trump
- Efforts to impeach Donald Trump
- ICE incidents in New York City during the second Trump presidency
- Government attacks on journalists in the United States during Donald Trump's second presidency
- List of federal political scandals in the United States (21st century)
- List of United States presidential vetoes § Donald Trump
- Political positions of Donald Trump
