= Callen-Lorde Community Health Center =

Primary care center in New York City

Coordinates: 40.743054°N 74.003147°W

Callen-Lorde
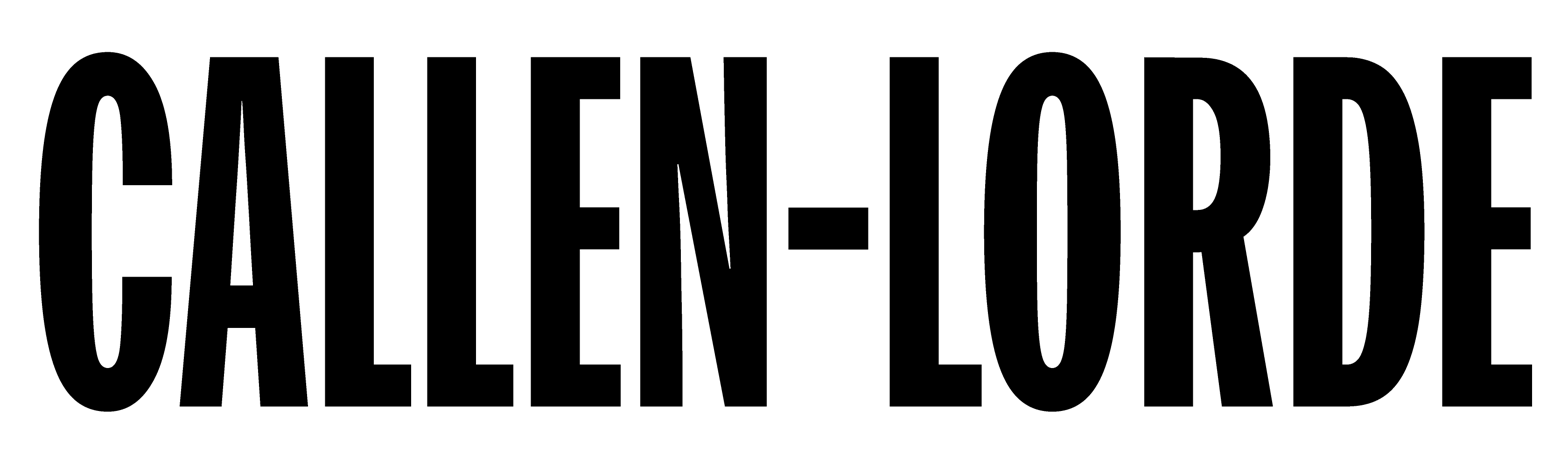
- Callen-Lorde Logo
- Type: health center
- Headquarters: New York City, United States
- Location: 356 West 18th Street
- CEO: Patrick McGovern
- Key people: Demetre C. Daskalakis, MD, MPH; Serena Chang, MD
- Website: callen-lorde.org

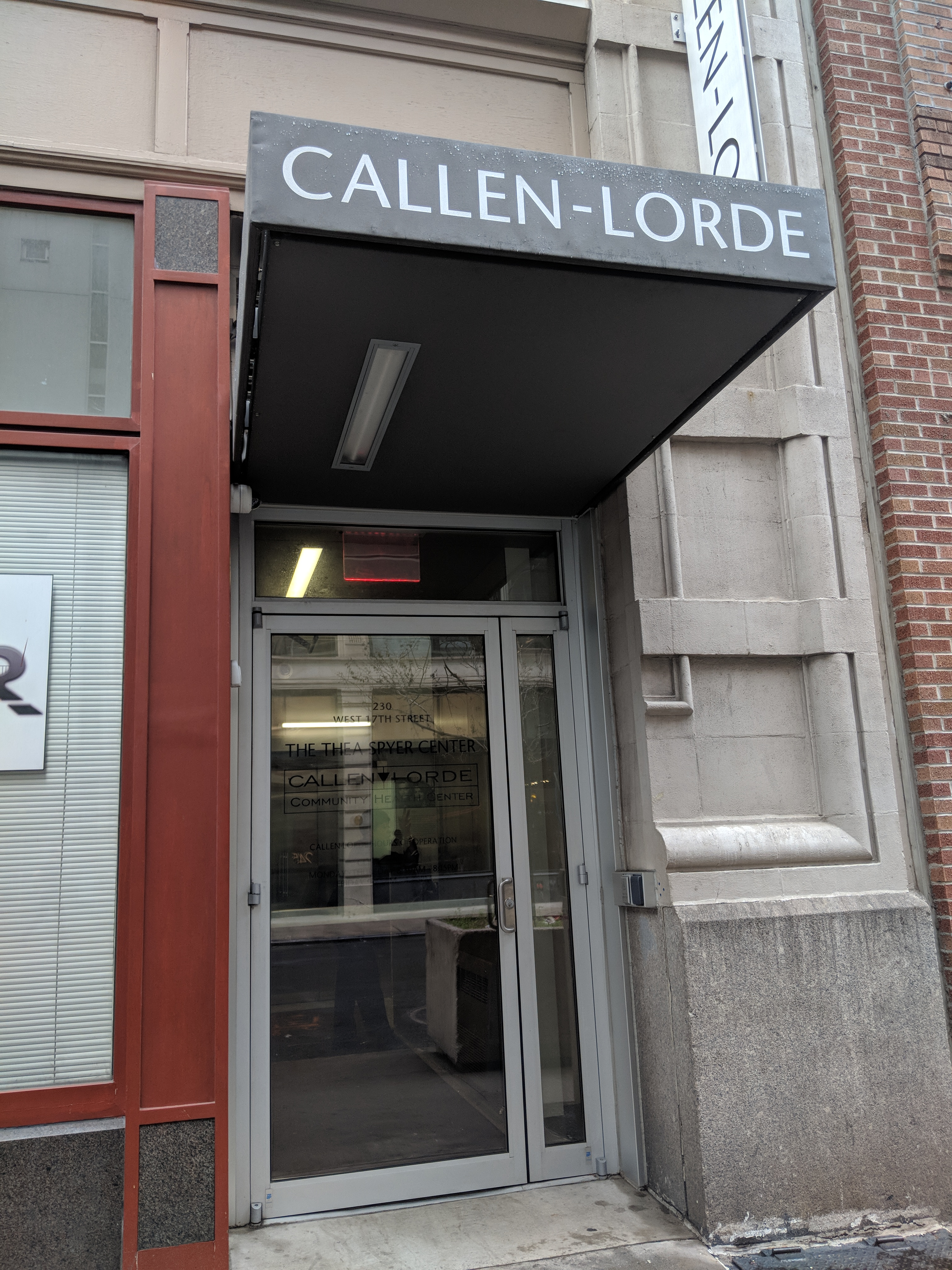
Main entrance

Callen-Lorde Community Health Center is a primary care center located at 356 West 18th Street in New York, New York, with satellite locations in Brooklyn and The Bronx. It also provides comprehensive mental health services at Brooklyn Community Health Center. Callen-Lorde is dedicated to providing medical health care to the city's LGBTQ population without regard to ability to pay. It is named in honor of Michael Callen and Audre Lorde.

Their facilities offer a variety of services, including dental care, HIV/STD testing and treatment, mental health services, women's health services, transgender hormone therapy, and medical case management support. Callen-Lorde is also home to the Health Outreach to Teens (HOTT) program, which serves youth between the ages of 13 and 24 in an on-premises clinic and a fully equipped medical van. The Cecilia Occupational Inclusion Network (COIN) Clinic, founded by late transgender icon Cecilia Gentili, is also housed within Callen-Lorde.

== History ==
Callen-Lorde is the only primary care center in New York City created specifically to serve LGBTQ communities. Its grassroots heritage dates back nearly 50 years to the St. Mark's Community Clinic and the Gay Men's Health Project, two volunteer-based clinics that provided screening and treatment for sexually-transmitted diseases. These clinics merged in 1983 to form Community Health Project, a mostly volunteer-staffed, episodic care program housing the nation's first community-based HIV clinic. The center has grown both in size and scope since these early days: from a 2,500 square-foot space inside of the Lesbian, Gay, Bisexual & Transgender Community Center on West 13th Street that primarily worked with HIV and other sexually transmitted diseases, into a comprehensive primary care center housed in more than three locations, including the 6-floor, 27,000 square-foot 18th Street facility that it moved into in 1997.

In 2007, it was among over 530 New York City arts and social service institutions to receive part of a $30 million grant from the Carnegie Corporation, which was made possible through a donation by New York City Mayor Michael Bloomberg.

In 2015, during National Health Center Week, Callen-Lorde was one of 266 health centers selected for Affordable Care Act funding as a federally qualified health center, for providing primary care to a medically underserved population. In a proclamation announcing these awards, President Obama declared, "This week, as we recognize the 50-year anniversary of the first community health centers being established in America, let us remember that health care is not a privilege for the few among us who can afford it, but a right for all Americans -- and let us recognize the vital role health centers across our country play in carrying us toward greater health for our people."

In 2016, Callen-Lorde opened a new center in the Bronx, at 3144 3rd Avenue, in the South Bronx neighborhood. Their Brooklyn location would open in 2020 after an $18.2 million, 25,000-square-foot facility was constructed in Downtown Brooklyn, located at 40 Flatbush Avenue Extension.

Former director of the National Center for Immunization and Respiratory Diseases (NCIRD) Dr. Demetre Daskalakis started to serve as chief medical officer of Callen-Lorde in February 2026. He had resigned alongside at least three other former CDC senior officials in August 2025, following news of CDC director Susan Monarez's ouster by the Trump administration. In an interview the following day with The Advocate, he had said, "The CDC you knew is over" and "Unless someone takes radical action, there is nothing there that can be salvaged."

== See also ==
- Michael Callen and Audre Lorde, for whom the organization is named.
