= Kathy Greenlee =

American politician

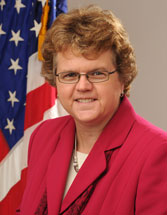

4th Assistant Secretary for Aging
- In office June 24, 2009 – July 29, 2016
- Appointed by: Barack Obama
- Preceded by: Josefina Carbonell
- Succeeded by: Lance Allen Robertson

Kansas Secretary of Aging
- In office January 13, 2006 – June 24, 2009
- Appointed by: Kathleen Sebelius
- Preceded by: Pamela Johnson-Betts
- Succeeded by: Martin Kennedy

Personal details
- Party: Democratic
- Education: University of Kansas

Kathy J. Greenlee was appointed by U.S. President Barack Obama as the fourth Assistant Secretary for Aging at the U.S. Department of Health and Human Services and confirmed by the Senate in June 2009.

== Biography ==
As Assistant Secretary for Aging, Greenlee oversaw a budget of $1.9 billion, $819 million of which funds senior nutrition programs like Meals on Wheels. The agency also funds $539 million in grants to programs to help seniors stay in their homes through services (such as accomplishing essential activities of daily living, like getting to the doctor's office, buying groceries etc.) and through help given to caregivers.

Greenlee served as Secretary of Aging for the state of Kansas from January 2006 to June 2009. In that capacity, she led a cabinet-level agency with 192 full-time staff members and a total budget of $495 million. Her department oversaw the state's Older Americans Act programs, the distribution of Medicaid long-term care payments and regulation of nursing home licensure and survey processes.

Greenlee has served on the board of the National Association of State Units on Aging since 2008. From 2004-2006, Greenlee served as State Long-Term Care Ombudsman in Kansas, and prior to that, was the state's Assistant Secretary of Aging. From 1999-2002, Greenlee served as general counsel at the Kansas Insurance Department. During her tenure there, she led the team of regulators who evaluated the proposed sale of Blue Cross Blue Shield of Kansas, and oversaw the Senior Health Insurance Counseling for Kansas program. Greenlee also served as Chief of Staff and Chief of Operations for then Governor Kathleen Sebelius.

She is a graduate of the University of Kansas with degrees in business administration and law. An open lesbian, she has been co-chair of Equality Kansas.
