= Susan Monarez =

American microbiologist (born 1974)

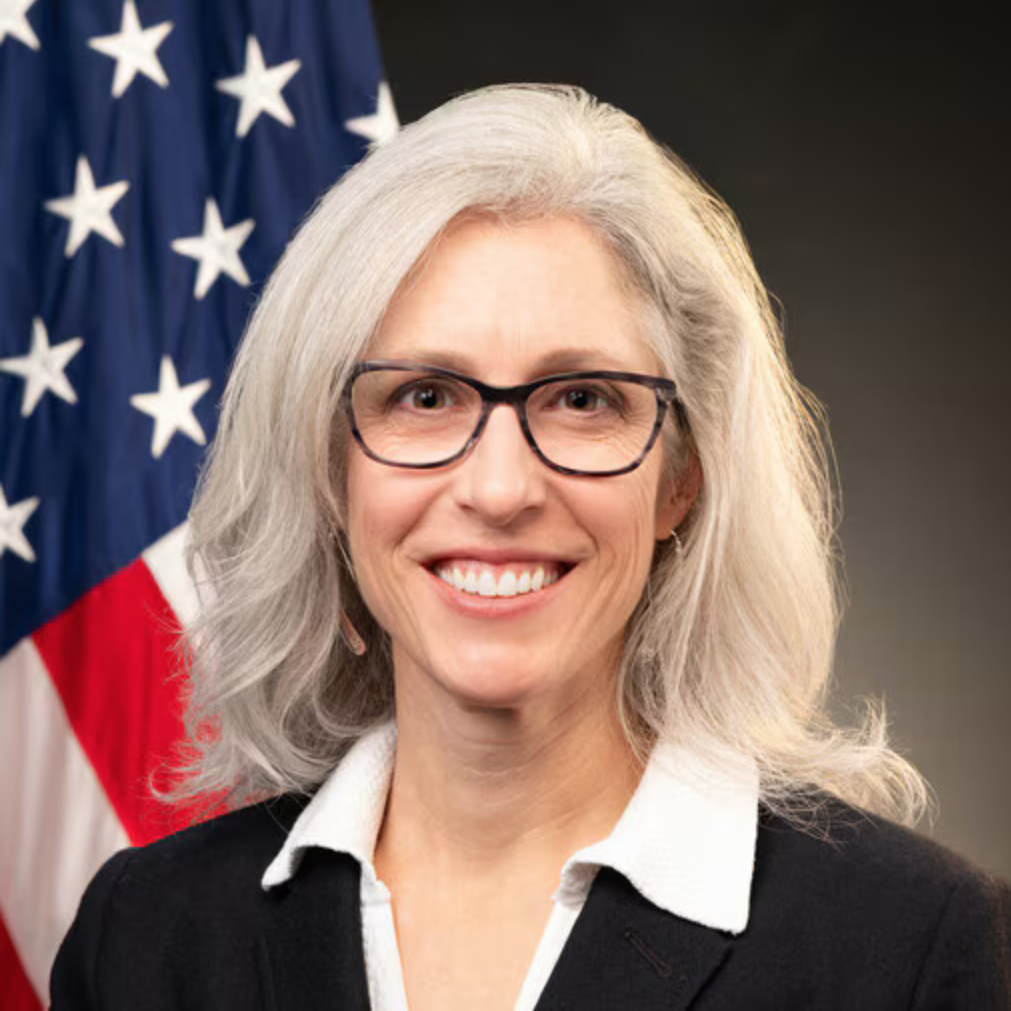
- Official portrait, 2025

21st Director of the Centers for Disease Control and Prevention
- In office July 31, 2025 – August 27, 2025
- President: Donald Trump
- Deputy: Debra Houry (acting)
- Preceded by: Matthew Buzzelli (acting)
- Succeeded by: Erica Schwartz
- Acting; January 23, 2025 – March 24, 2025
- President: Donald Trump
- Deputy: Nirav D. Shah; Debra Houry (acting)
- Preceded by: Mandy Cohen
- Succeeded by: Matthew Buzzelli (acting)

Personal details
- Born: Susan Patricia Coller; November 6, 1974 (age 52)
- Education: University of Wisconsin, Madison (BS, MS, PhD)

Susan Patricia Coller Monarez (née Coller; born November 6, 1974) is an American microbiologist and public health official serving as the Strategic Health Technology and Funding Advisor for the California Department of Public Health initiative known as the Public Health Network Innovation Exchange. She served as the Director of the Centers for Disease Control and Prevention, first in an acting capacity from January to March 2025, and then as a confirmed position for under a month from July to August 2025.

Monarez's early career was as an academic microbiologist. She then served in several U.S. government positions as a science administrator, including at the U.S. Department of Homeland Security, and later as Deputy Director of the Advanced Research Projects Agency for Health.

== Early life ==
Monarez grew up in rural Wisconsin. According to Monarez, her father was a dairy farmer who had to sell his farm after a disease outbreak in his herd and later became a police officer, while her mother worked in various factory and clerical jobs and as a librarian.

== Academic career ==
Monarez completed a B.S. in microbiology at the University of Wisconsin–Madison, and then her Ph.D. in microbiology and immunology in 2003 at the same institution. Her Ph.D. research advisor was Donna Paulnock, and her research focused on developing technologies to prevent, diagnose, and treat infectious diseases, particularly those affecting low- and middle-income countries. Her dissertation explored how trypanosome GIP-sVSG regulates macrophages during Trypanosoma brucei rhodesiense infection.

Monarez was a postdoctoral researcher from 2003 to 2006 at Stanford University School of Medicine in John C. Boothroyd's group, continuing her work in the field of infectious disease research. Her academic work focused on effective remedies for two diseases, African sleeping sickness and toxoplasmosis.

== Government career ==
Monarez was a Science and Technology Policy Fellow with the American Association for the Advancement of Science during 2006–2007. She worked as a science and policy advisor at Biomedical Advanced Research and Development Authority (BARDA) during 2006–2009, and at the Homeland Security Advanced Research Projects Agency (HSARPA) during 2009–2013.

Monarez served as Assistant Director for National Health Security and International Affairs in the Office of Science and Technology Policy, and the Director of Medical Preparedness Policy on the National Security Council during 2014–2016, where her work included initiatives to combat antimicrobial resistance, expand the use of wearable technology for health monitoring, and improve pandemic preparedness efforts.

At the U.S. Department of Homeland Security, Monarez served as Deputy Assistant Secretary for Strategy and Data Analytics during 2016–2018, overseeing research portfolios for BARDA and HSARPA. In this capacity, she also led international cooperative initiatives to foster bilateral and multilateral collaboration in health research and innovation.

Monarez was the founding director of the Office of Planning, Analysis and Evaluation at the Health Resources and Services Administration during 2018–2022.

In January 2023, Monarez was appointed deputy director of the Advanced Research Projects Agency for Health (ARPA-H), where she led projects focused on applying artificial intelligence and machine learning to improve health outcomes, addressing healthcare accessibility and affordability, expanding mental health interventions, combating the opioid epidemic in the United States, addressing disparities in maternal health, and improving organ donation and transplantation systems.

=== Centers for Disease Control and Prevention ===
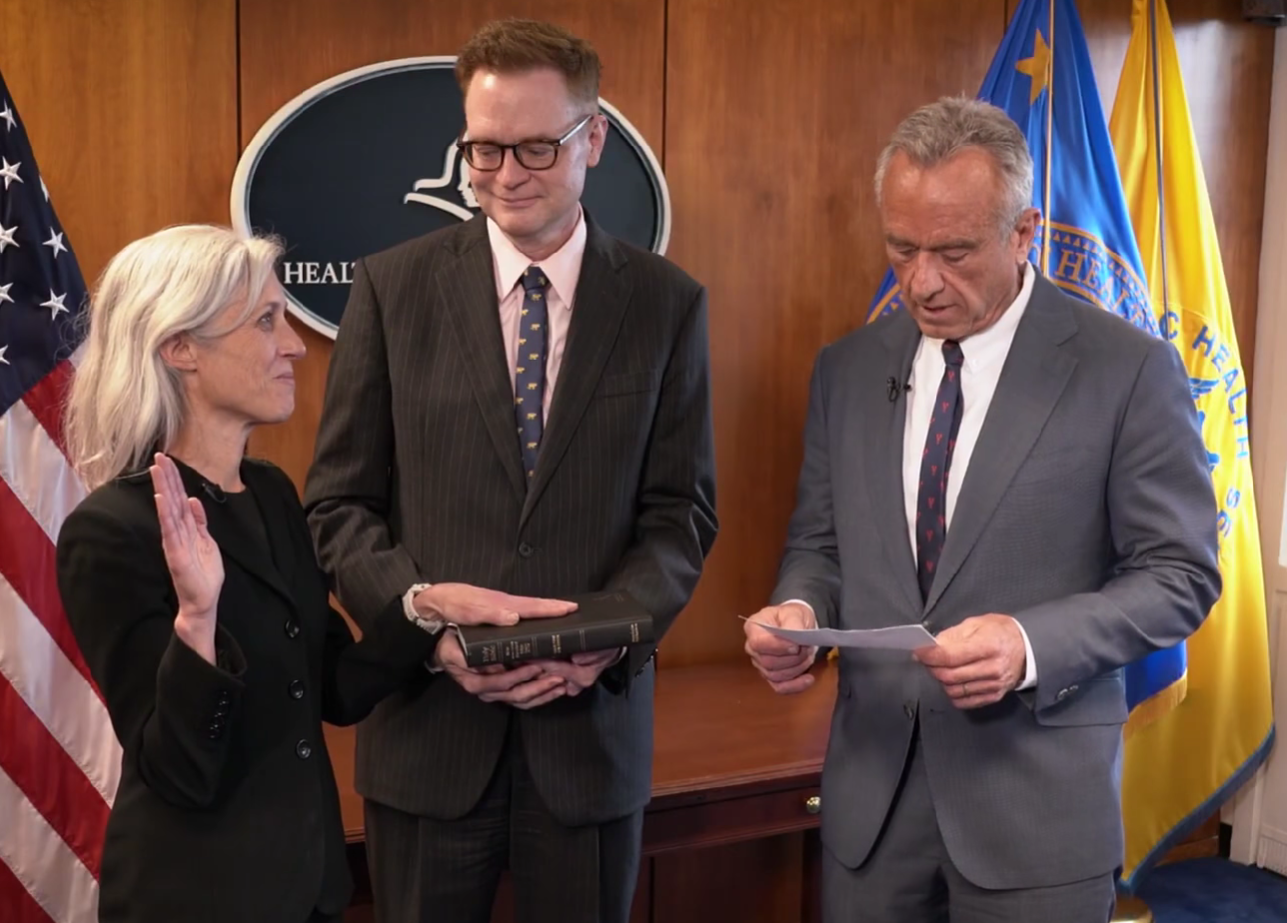
Monarez being sworn in as the 21st CDC Director; August 6, 2025

Monarez became Principal Deputy Director and Acting Director of the Centers for Disease Control and Prevention (CDC) on January 23, 2025. Her leadership responsibilities at the CDC included overseeing responses to public health emergencies and emerging diseases.

Donald Trump announced her nomination as permanent Director on March 24, 2025, after he withdrew his previous nomination of Dave Weldon. She was the first appointee to the position requiring confirmation by the Senate due to a provision in the Consolidated Appropriations Act, 2023. Upon being nominated, she stepped down as Acting Director due to requirements of the Federal Vacancies Reform Act of 1998. On July 29, 2025, the U.S. Senate confirmed her 51–47 in a party-line vote. Because she has a Ph.D. rather than an M.D. degree, she was the first director without a medical degree since 1953.

On August 27, 2025, the Department of Health and Human Services (HHS) stated in a post on X that Monarez was no longer CDC Director. It was reported that she was fired because she refused to support directives from Secretary Robert F. Kennedy Jr. on changes to vaccine policy, including for approvals for COVID-19 vaccines, and to fire her senior staff, and for recruiting Senator Bill Cassidy to intervene in the dispute. On August 28, it was reported that the Trump administration was planning to appoint HHS Deputy Secretary Jim O'Neill as Acting CDC Director.

On the day of the firing, attorneys Mark Zaid and Abbe Lowell, representing Monarez, stated that she had not actually been fired yet, and that she would not resign. Later that day, White House Deputy Press Secretary Kush Desai announced via email that Monarez had been fired. Zaid maintained that the firing remained invalid because, as a Senate-confirmed official, Monarez could only be fired directly by President Trump himself and not by other White House officials. However, by September 3, she was no longer trying to be reinstated.

Monarez testifies before the Senate Committee on Health, Education, Labor and Pensions along with former CDC chief medical officer Debra Houry on September 17, 2025

Following news of her ouster, at least four other CDC senior officials announced their resignations:

- Debra Houry, Chief Medical Officer
- Demetre Daskalakis, Director of the National Center for Immunization and Respiratory Diseases
- Daniel B. Jernigan, Director of the National Center for Emerging and Zoonotic Infectious Diseases
- Jennifer Layden, Director of the Office of Public Health Data, Surveillance, and Technology, which contains the National Center for Health Statistics

On September 4, Secretary Kennedy testified before the Senate Finance Committee, where Massachusetts Senator Elizabeth Warren and Vermont Senator Bernie Sanders questioned him about rumors surrounding Monarez's firing. Kennedy claimed that he simply asked her to resign because she told him that she wasn't trustworthy. On September 17, Monarez told the Senate Committee on Health, Education, Labor and Pensions that she confirmed that she was fired because she did not preemptively commit to accepting CDC advisory panel recommendations and firing some career officials overseeing vaccine policy, thus confirming the earlier reports. Senator Warren addressed the firing, saying, "I was afraid she was going to bend the knee to [Secretary Kennedy] and Donald Trump, and it looks like she didn't bend the knee so [Secretary Kennedy] fired her." She believes that the true reason was holding the line on scientific integrity.

=== California Department of Public Health ===
She was hired as the Strategic Health Technology and Funding Advisor in December 2025 when the California Department of Public Health formed the initiative known as the Public Health Network Innovation Exchange.

Government offices
Preceded by Mandy Cohen	Director of the Centers for Disease Control and Prevention; Acting; 2025	Succeeded by Matthew Buzzelli; Acting
Preceded by Matthew Buzzelli; Acting	Director of the Centers for Disease Control and Prevention; 2025	Succeeded by Jim O'Neill
