= 2025 U.S. Department of Health and Human Services reorganization proposal =

Reorganization of federal government department

A diagram of organizational changes to the U.S. Department of Health and Human Services proposed by the Trump Administration in 2025

In March 2025, a reorganization of the United States Department of Health and Human Services (HHS) was announced. It major proposed changes included merging several existing agencies into a new Administration for a Healthy America, reorienting the Centers for Disease Control and Prevention towards infectious disease programs, and breaking up the Administration for Community Living.

In addition, the plan proposed a reduction in workforce totaling about 20,000 full-time employees throughout HHS through multiple avenues, with the greatest relative announced reductions to the Food and Drug Administration and Centers for Disease Control and Prevention, which were each expected to reduce their workforce by 20%.

The reduction in force was carried out and significantly reduced staffing levels in the department, including centralizing human resources, information technology, procurement, external affairs, and policy functions into HHS-wide offices. However, almost none of the organizational changes were actually implemented.

The consolidation had a stated goal of improving efficiency and reducing redundancy within HHS, and is intended to improve coordination among similar programs and streamline the delivery of services, particularly for low-income populations. However, it criticism from public health experts, former officials, labor unions and Democratic lawmakers.

== Background ==
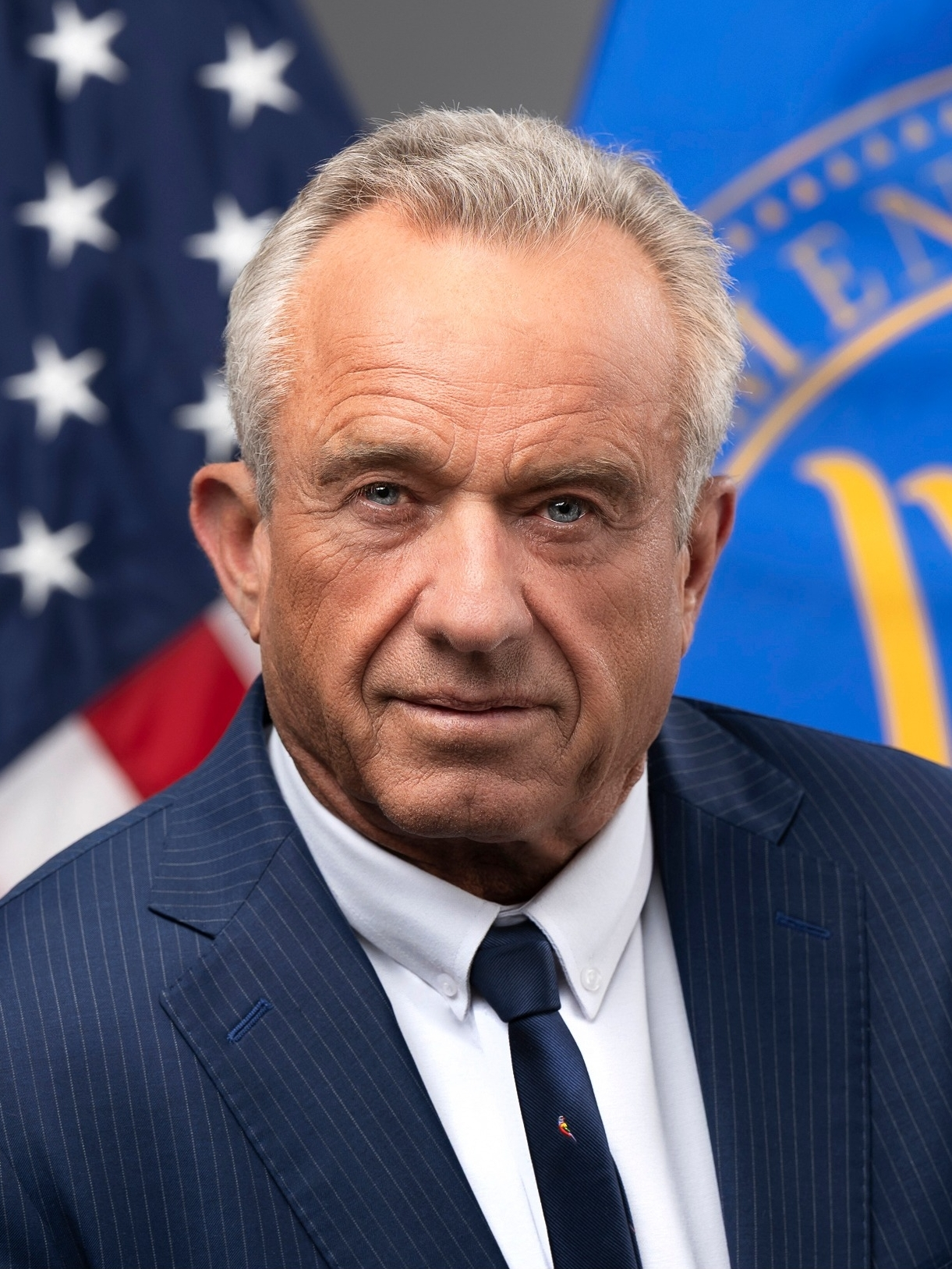
HHS Secretary Robert F. Kennedy Jr. announced the reorganization on March 27, 2025, as an implementation of President Donald Trump's Executive Order 14210.

The overall organizational structure of HHS is the result of the Public Health Service reorganizations of 1966–1973, as well as the 1980 spinoff of the Department of Education. Since then there have been a few new operating agencies and minor reorganizations.

The individual agencies within HHS draw their statutory authority from a patchwork of authorization bills passed by Congress, and administrative regulations instituted by the department or its agencies through the federal rulemaking process. On one extreme, the National Institutes of Health is authorized by the 1930 Ransdell Act and its subsequent amendments, which also specify all of its constituent institutes and centers, meaning these can only be changed by an act of Congress. On the other extreme, the Centers for Disease Control and Prevention is not directly established by any statute, but by departmental regulation that delegates to it some authorities of the umbrella 1944 Public Health Service Act as amended, although specific statutes exist for three of its component centers.

After the 2024 presidential election and the beginning of the second Trump administration, Robert F. Kennedy Jr. was confirmed as Secretary of Health and Human Services. On February 11, 2025, President Trump signed Executive Order 14210, "Implementing the President's 'Department of Government Efficiency' Cost Efficiency Initiative". The order required large-scale reductions in force in consultation with the Department of Government Efficiency program, and submission of a reorganization plan by each agency to the Office of Management and Budget within 30 days.

The video announcement of the reorganization

The reorganization was announced through a press release and video posted on social media on March 27, 2025. It was reported that there was no input from agency-level human resources staff or leadership before the reorganization was announced, and details beyond the press release were not immediately provided to employees. It was also reported that the sending of notices was delayed due to tensions between HHS leadership and the DOGE lead for HHS, with the former being given extra time to scrutinize the firing plans.

== Reduction in force ==
=== Proposal ===
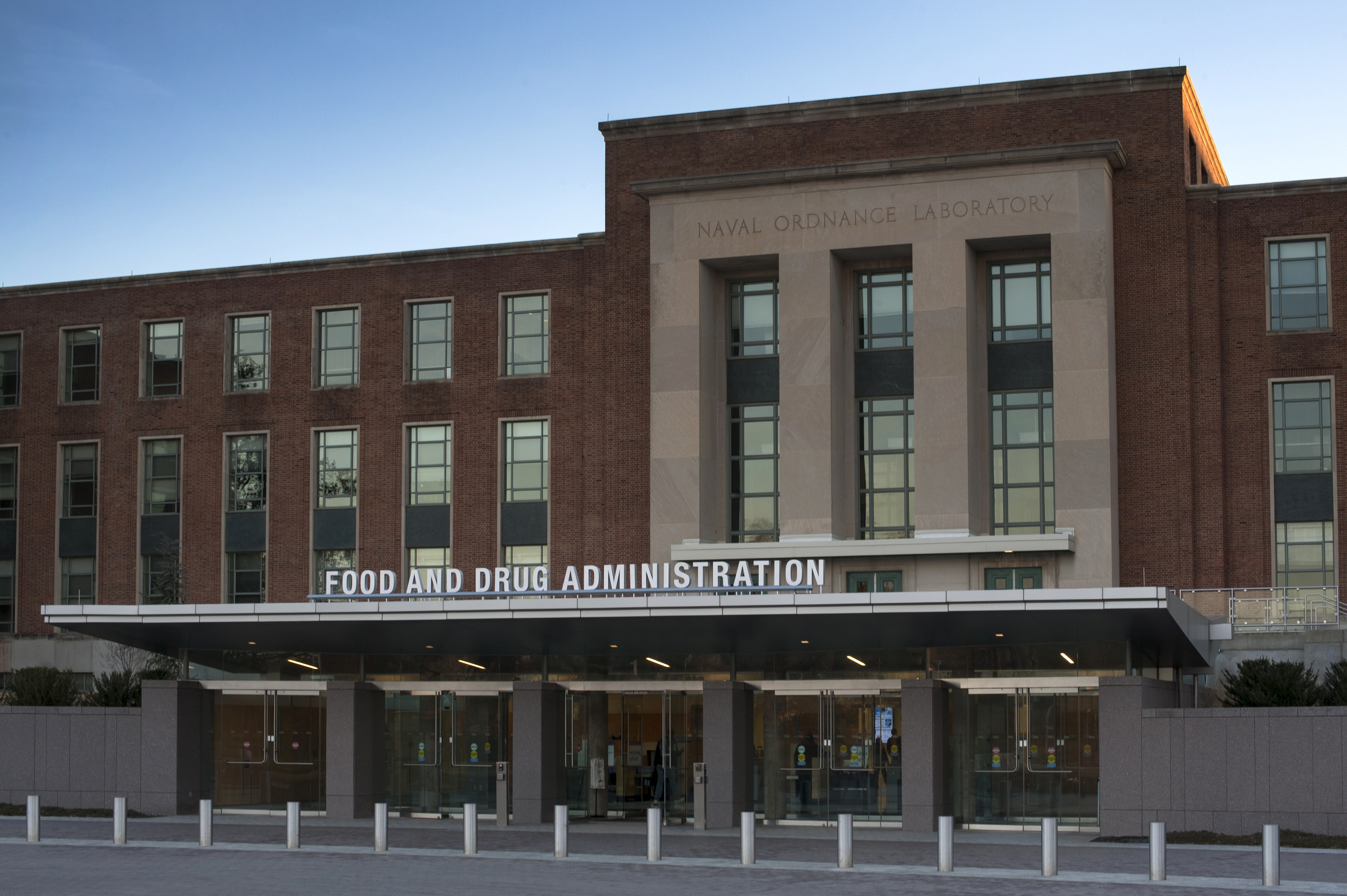
FDA, whose White Oak Campus headquarters is pictured, and CDC are each projected to lose 20% of their workforce.

The plan proposed a reduction in workforce of about 10,000 full-time employees, in addition to 10,000 additional employees who voluntarily left through other programs including a Voluntary Early Retirement Authority and the Deferred Resignation Program. Taken together, these programs were expected to reduce HHS's workforce from 82,000 to 62,000 full-time employees, a figure that was in adition to about 5,200 probationary workers who were targets of the disputed 2025 mass layoffs. Most of these reductions were planned to be targeted towards administrative functions. The layoffs were projected to take effect on May 27, 2025.

The Food and Drug Administration (FDA) was proposed to decrease its workforce by ~3,500 full-time employees, a reduction of about 20%. The FDA cuts would not be applied to drug, medical device, and food reviewers and inspectors. However, the Center for Devices and Radiological Health faced significant layoffs.

The Centers for Disease Control and Prevention (CDC) was proposed to decrease its workforce by ~2,400, also a reduction of about 20%. The announcement stated that only 1,000 of the Administration for Strategic Preparedness and Response's 5,000 employees would join CDC, implying that the rest would be laid off or reassigned. Over two-thirds of the staff of the National Institute for Occupational Safety and Health was laid off, which most strongly impacted its mining safety research and respirator approval programs, with its laboratory in Spokane, Washington expected to close completely, as well as the National Firefighter Registry for Cancer.

The National Institutes of Health was proposed to decrease it workforce by ~1,200, and the Centers for Medicare & Medicaid Services by ~300. The Health Resources and Services Administration's workforce was decreased by a third, especially impacting its Bureau of Primary Health Care. The Indian Health Service was exempt from firings.

=== Implementation ===
Notices went out to employees early in the morning of April 1, although some employees learned they had been laid off only when their entry badges failed to work when they arrived in the morning. Long lines formed at the entrances to some federal buildings due to increased security. Because the layoffs targeted entire units, the normal process of ranking individual personnel to lay off was avoided. Many senior leaders were told they were being reassigned to Indian Health Service locations in Alaska, Montana, New Mexico, Minnesota, or other locations far from Washington, DC, to push them to leave voluntarily.

== Organizational changes ==
=== Proposal ===
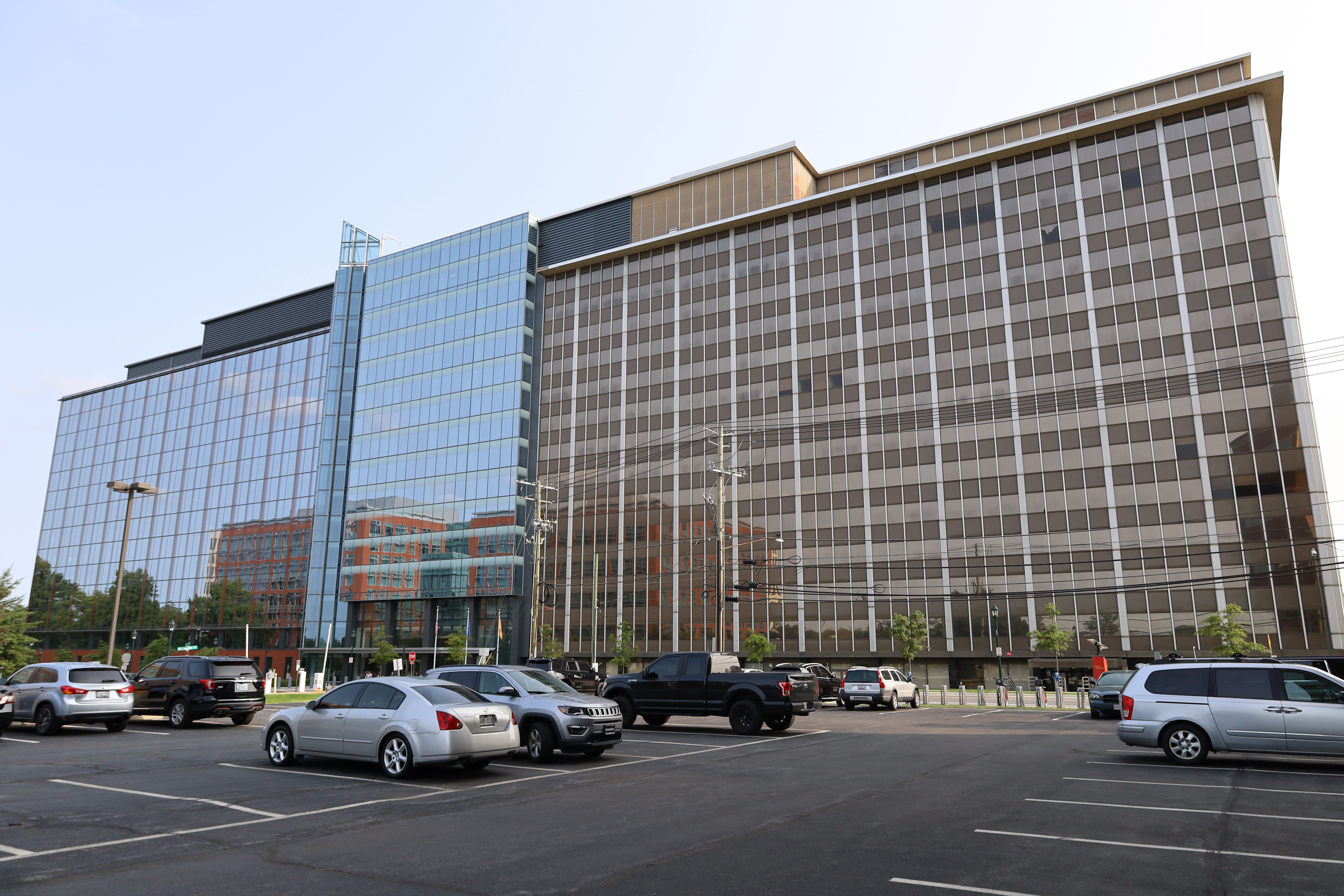
5600 Fishers Lane in North Bethesda, Maryland holds the headquarters of HRSA, SAMHSA, and AHRQ, all of which were planned to be merged into other agencies.

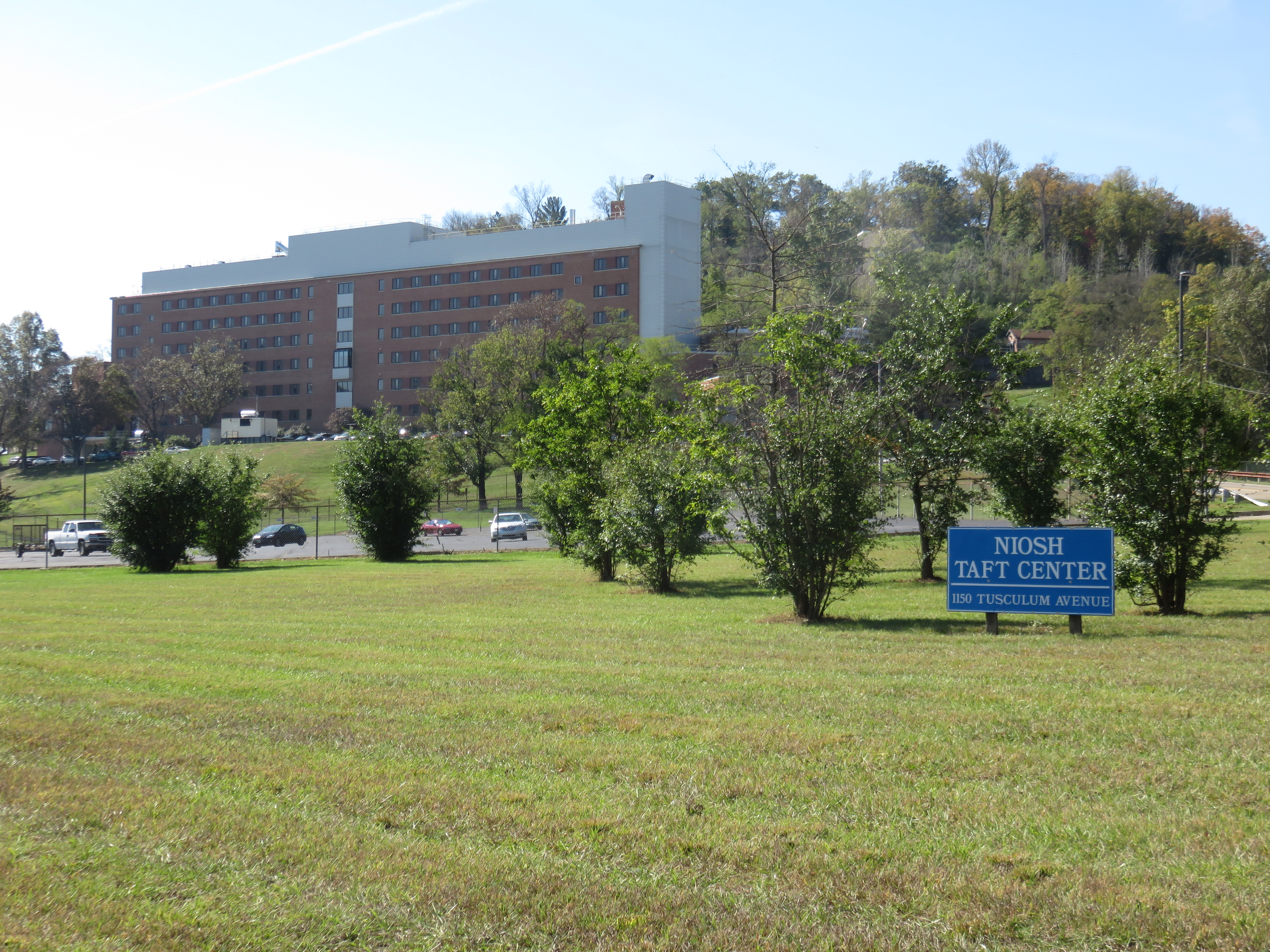
NIOSH, whose Taft Laboratory in Cincinnati, Ohio is pictured, was planned to be transferred from CDC to the new Administration for a Healthy America.

The reorganization proposed to reduce the number of top-level HHS divisions from 28 to 15. More details about the reorganization were contained in the Trump Administration's presidential budget request for fiscal year 2026, which was released on May 30, 2025.

Some of these proposals were able to be implemented through administrative regulations directly instituted by the HHS Secretary through the federal rulemaking process, while others would have required Congress to pass legislation amending existing authorization bills.

==== Administration for a Healthy America ====
The Administration for a Healthy America was planned to be created from merging the following:

- Three top-level agencies: the Health Resources and Services Administration (HRSA), Substance Abuse and Mental Health Services Administration (SAMHSA), and Office of the Assistant Secretary for Health (OASH)
- From the Centers for Disease Control and Prevention (CDC): the National Institute for Occupational Safety and Health and a few surviving functions from centers dealing with non-infectious disease, which were planned to be largely eliminated in favor of efforts by individual states
- The National Institute of Environmental Health Sciences from the National Institutes of Health (NIH)
- The anti-doping functions of the Office of National Drug Control Policy

It was planned to ultimately have the following divisions:

- Primary Care: consolidating functions from the HRSA Bureau of Primary Health Care, Healthcare Systems Bureau, Federal Office of Rural Health Policy, and Office for the Advancement of Telehealth; CDC National Center for Injury Prevention and Control; OASH Office of Disease Prevention and Health Promotion and Office of Minority Health; and anti-doping programs transferred from the Office of National Drug Control Policy
- Environmental Health: consolidating functions from the National Institute for Occupational Safety and Health and the Safe Water Program from the CDC National Center for Environmental Health, and NIH's National Institute of Environmental Health Sciences
- HIV/AIDS: consolidating functions from the HRSA Ryan White HIV/AIDS Program, OASH Office of Infectious Disease and HIV/AIDS Policy, and CDC's HIV/AIDS prevention and policy functions
- Maternal and Child Health: consolidating functions from the HRSA Maternal and Child Health Bureau, CDC National Center on Birth Defects and Developmental Disabilities, and OASH Office on Women's Health
- Mental and Behavioral Health: most functions from SAMHSA, and drug-free communities programs transferred from the Office of National Drug Control Policy
- Health Workforce: functions from the HRSA Bureau of Health Workforce
- Policy, Research, and Oversight: consolidating the Office of the Surgeon General from OASH, the National Vaccine Injury Compensation Program and Covered Countermeasure Process Fund from the HRSA Healthcare Systems Bureau, the Alzheimer's Disease Program from the CDC National Center for Chronic Disease Prevention and Health Promotion, lead poisoning programs from the CDC National Center for Environmental Health, and data collection and public awareness functions transferred from SAMHSA

==== Other new agencies ====
- The Administration for Children, Families, and Communities was planned to absorb the Administration for Children and Families and the Administration for Community Living.
- The Office of the Assistant Secretary for Enforcement was planned to absorb the Departmental Appeals Board, Office of Medicare Hearings and Appeals, and Office for Civil Rights, as well as the Office for Human Research Protections transferred from OASH.
- The Office of the Assistant Secretary for a Healthy Future was planned to combine the Biomedical Advanced Research and Development Authority (currently in ASPR) with the Advanced Research Projects Agency for Health.
- The Office of the Assistant Secretary for External Affairs was planned to consolidate global, legislative, intergovernmental, and public affairs functions.
- The Office of the Chief Technology Officer was planned to absorb the Office of the Chief Information Officer (currently under the Office of the Assistant Secretary for Administration) and the Office of the National Coordinator for Health Information Technology.

==== Changes to existing agencies ====
- CDC would be reoriented towards emerging and infectious disease programs. It was planned to absorb the Administration for Strategic Preparedness and Response and departmental global affairs staff, while the National Institute for Occupational Safety and Health was planned to move into the new Administration for a Healthy America. Additionally, the National Center for Chronic Diseases Prevention and Health Promotion, National Center for Environmental Health, National Center for Injury Prevention and Control, Global Health Center, and the Public Health Preparedness and Response program would be eliminated in favor of efforts by individual states or elsewhere in HHS. The Division of HIV Prevention would also be eliminated or reduced.
- NIH was proposed to have four of its institutes eliminated, and the remainder consolidated into eight institutes:
  - The National Cancer Institute, National Institute of Allergy and Infectious Diseases, and National Institute on Aging would be retained.
  - The National Institute of Nursing Research, National Center for Complementary and Integrative Health, Fogarty International Center, and National Institute on Minority Health and Health Disparities would be eliminated.
  - The National Institute of General Medical Sciences would absorb four other institutes and centers.
  - The remaining institutes would be consolidated into four new institutes.
- The Centers for Medicare & Medicaid Services was planned to absorb the 340B Drug Pricing Program and Organ Transplantation Program from the HRSA Healthcare Systems Bureau.
- The Patient-Centered Outcomes Research Trust Fund was proposed to be eliminated.
- The Office of the Assistant Secretary for Planning and Evaluation was planned to become the Office of Strategy, and was to absorb the Agency for Healthcare Research and Quality, the National Center for Health Statistics transferred from CDC, and the Office of Research Integrity transferred from OASH.
- The Consumer Product Safety Commission, an independent agency, was proposed to be moved into HHS as the new Office of the Assistant Secretary for Consumer Product Safety.

Offices at each agency dealing with human resources, information technology, procurement, external affairs, and policy were to be replaced with centralized HHS-wide offices. According to Kennedy, HHS was said to have over 100 communications offices, over 40 information technology departments, dozens of procurement offices, and nine human resources departments. Additionally, the ten existing HHS regional offices were planned to be consolidated into five.

== Litigation ==
The case AFGE v. Trump was brought by the American Federation of Government Employees and other plaintiffs seeking to stop implementation of Executive Order 14210 in several government agencies including HHS. On May 9, 2025, the U.S. District Court for the Northern District of California issued a temporary restraining order enjoining implementation of Executive Order 14210 and related agency reduction in force (RIF) plans. This was later extended into a preliminary injunction that also ordered that RIFs be reversed, but stayed this until appeals were exhausted. On May 30, the Court of Appeals for the Ninth Circuit declined to overturn the ruling. The U.S. District Court for Rhode Island also issued a preliminary injunction on July 1 blocking the reorganization. However, the Supreme Court overturned the lower courts on July 8.

The case New York v. Kennedy was brought by 19 states and the District of Columbia challenging the personnel actions and reorganization for HHS specifically. On July 1, the District Court for the District of Rhode Island issued a preliminary injunction ruling that the reorganization likely violated the Administrative Procedure Act, and preventing HHS from issuing or enforcing new or existing RIF firings or placement on administrative leave, or implementing the announced restructurings. On July 18 the court rejected that the AFGE Supreme Court decision was controlling.

== Reaction ==
The creation of the Administration for a Healthy America and the broader HHS restructuring drew criticism from public health experts, former officials, labor unions, and Democratic lawmakers. Critics argued that the layoffs—part of a plan to reduce HHS staff by 20,000 employees—would severely impact the department's capacity to respond to public health crises. Senator Patty Murray described the plan as “an absurd suggestion” that “defies common sense,” citing ongoing outbreaks of bird flu, measles, and the fentanyl epidemic.

Labor unions also raised concerns. Doreen Greenwald, president of the National Treasury Employees Union, which represents around 18,500 HHS staff, stated the administration's claims that deep cuts to agencies like the Food and Drug Administration would not be harmful were "preposterous," and vowed to “pursue every opportunity to fight back.” Critics further expressed unease about centralizing oversight under HHS Secretary Robert F. Kennedy Jr., who has a long history of promoting discredited claims regarding vaccine safety.
