= Demetre Daskalakis =

American infectious disease physician

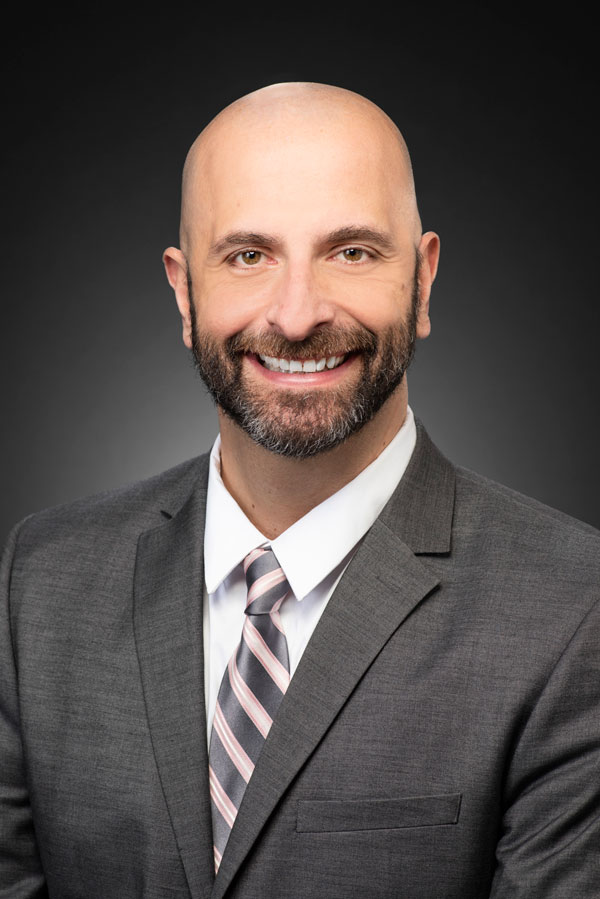
- Born: 1972 or 1973 (age 52–53); Washington, D.C., U.S.
- Education: Columbia University (BS); New York University (MD); Harvard University (MPH)
- Medical career
- Profession: Infectious disease physician
- Institutions: Mount Sinai Hospital; New York University; New York City Department of Health; Centers for Disease Control and Prevention

Demetre Costas Daskalakis (born 1972/1973) is an American infectious disease physician and gay health activist who served in leadership roles at the US Centers for Disease Control and Prevention (CDC) from 2020 to 2025. At the CDC, he was director of the National Center for Immunization and Respiratory Diseases (NCIRD) and was previously director of the Division of HIV Prevention at the National Center for HIV/AIDS, Viral Hepatitis, STD, and TB Prevention. During the administration of Joe Biden, he was appointed deputy coordinator of the White House's mpox response to the 2022–2023 outbreak of the disease.

== Early life and education ==
Daskalakis was born in Washington, D.C., to Greek parents and raised in Arlington, Virginia. He entered Columbia University in 1991 and earned a bachelor's degree in biology in 1995. He recalls becoming interested in AIDS during his senior year at Columbia University, when he was given the task to fly the AIDS Memorial Quilt as part of a student campaign to raise awareness of AIDS.

He then received his medical degree from the NYU School of Medicine and completed postgraduate medical training at Harvard Medical School in 2003. He completed his residency at Beth Israel Deaconess Medical Center in Boston in 2003. He completed a Clinical Infectious Disease fellowship at Brigham and Women's Hospital and Massachusetts General Hospital's combined program. Daskalakis earned board certification in Internal Medicine in 2002 and became board certified in Infectious Disease in 2005. In 2012, he earned a Master of Public Health from the Harvard T.H. Chan School of Public Health.

== Career ==
Daskalakis worked at Mount Sinai Hospital in Brooklyn, where at one time he held the position of medical director of ambulatory HIV services. He was also an assistant professor at New York University. His work with the Men's Sexual Health Project, which he founded in 2006, involved work in sex clubs and bathhouses to test men for sexually transmitted diseases, including HIV, and direct them to care.

Daskalakis joined the New York City Department of Health in 2013. During a 2012-2013 meningitis outbreak in the city, Daskalakis opened a pop-up clinic as part of a vaccination campaign targeting at-risk groups, such as men who had sex with men, and was credited with halting it. By 2014, he was deputy commissioner for the Division of Disease Control at the New York City Department of Health and Mental Hygiene.

Daskalakis was a member of governor Andrew Cuomo's Ending the Epidemic Task Force, an effort to decrease HIV transmission rates in New York City. Since joining the city's health department, he has promoted the concept of "status-neutral care", a strategy for HIV treatment and prevention which takes the same approach to initial patient care regardless of the patient's HIV status. The concept was part of the plan for the Ending the Epidemic campaign.

Starting on December 21, 2020, he served as the Centers for Disease Control and Prevention's Director of the Division of HIV/AIDS Prevention in the National Center for HIV/AIDS, Viral Hepatitis, STD, and TB Prevention, later renamed the Division of HIV Prevention in October 2021. On August 2, 2022, President Joe Biden appointed him as the White House National Monkeypox Response Deputy Coordinator to respond to the 2022–2023 outbreak of the disease.

Daskalakis was subsequently appointed director of the National Center for Immunization and Respiratory Diseases (NCIRD). During the second Trump administration, his office's windows were pierced by bullets in the 2025 shooting at the Centers for Disease Control and Prevention headquarters, though he was not inside his office at the time.

In August 2025, following news of CDC director Susan Monarez's ouster by the Trump administration, Daskalakis resigned alongside at least three other CDC senior officials. Daskalakis told the Associated Press that he "came to the point" where he thought "our science will be compromised", describing that as "[his] line in the sand." In an interview the following day with The Advocate, he said, "The CDC you knew is over" and "Unless someone takes radical action, there is nothing there that can be salvaged."

Daskalakis serves as chief medical officer of the Callen-Lorde Community Health Center in New York since February 2026. He was also named to the transition team for New York City mayor Zohran Mamdani.

== Personal life ==
Daskalakis is gay. He met his husband, Michael Macneal, at Macneal's gym, Monster Cycle.

Daskalakis attended a Greek Orthodox church in Washington, D.C., while growing up. He has explained that a large tattoo of Jesus on his stomach was inspired by the church.
