= Josefina Carbonell =

American government official

Josefina G. Carbonell
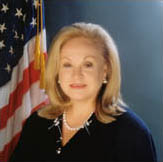

3rd Assistant Secretary for Aging
- In office August 8, 2001 – June 24, 2009
- Preceded by: Jeanette Takamura
- Succeeded by: Kathy Greenlee

Personal details
- Political party: Republican

Josefina G. Carbonell is a Cuban-born American government official. She was the third Assistant Secretary for Aging at the Administration on Aging within the U.S. Department of Health and Human Services. She was appointed by President Bush in 2001 and served in the position until 2009. Before her time in public service, Carbonell was president and CEO of the Little Havana Activities and Nutrition Centers in Florida. Carbonell is currently the Senior Vice President of Long-term Care & Nutrition at Independent Living Systems and serves on the board of directors of the National Council on Aging.

Carbonell was honored as an Outstanding American by Choice by the U.S. Citizenship and Immigration Services in 2007.
