= Jeanette Takamura =

Jeanette C. Takamura

2nd Assistant Secretary for Aging
- In office December 8, 1997 – August 8, 2001
- Preceded by: Fernando Torres-Gil
- Succeeded by: Josefina Carbonell

Deputy Director for Administration, Hawaii State Department of Health
- In office January 1995 – December 1996

Director, Hawaii Executive Office on Aging
- In office January 1985 – December 1994

Jeanette C. Takamura was the second Assistant Secretary for Aging at the Administration on Aging within the U.S. Department of Health and Human Services. She was appointed by President Clinton in 1997 and served in the position until 2001. Before that, she served as the Deputy Director for Administration of the Hawaii State Department of Health and the Director of the Executive Office on Aging within the State of Hawaii's Office of the Governor. Takamura is a professor at the Columbia University School of Social Work where she served as the dean from 2002 to 2016, the first woman to do so. She previously held the position of Edward R. Roybal Professor in Applied Gerontology and Public Service at California State University, Los Angeles.

Takamura is a third-generation Japanese American. She is married to Hawaii politician Carl T. Takamura. They have a daughter.

In 2009, Takamura was awarded the Order of the Rising Sun, Gold Rays with Neck Ribbon for "her contributions to the promotion of social welfare policies and programs and the status of Japanese Americans."
