= Martin Kennedy (Kansas politician) =

American politician

Secretary of Aging
- Incumbent
- Assumed office June 24, 2009
- Appointed by: Mark Parkinson
- Preceded by: Kathy Greenlee

Personal details
- Party: Democratic

Martin Kennedy was named as the Kansas Acting Secretary of Aging by Governor Mark Parkinson. Kennedy replaced Secretary Kathy Greenlee who became the Assistant Secretary for Aging at the U.S. Department of Health and Human Services.

Kennedy has been with the Kansas Department on Aging since 2004 and was named Deputy Secretary last November. Previously, the Acting Secretary served in finance and management roles, including Controller for the Kansas Insurance Department and as a Principal Analyst in the Kansas Division of the Budget. He earned his Master’s in Public Administration from Kansas State University.

Kennedy served as interim Secretary when Kathy Greenlee was confirmed as Assistant Secretary for Aging at the U.S. Department of Health and Human Services in late June. The Governor’s Cabinet is subject to Kansas Senate Confirmation. While the Legislature is adjourned, the Senate Oversight Committee must approve the appointment until the Senate can consider the nomination.
