= Organization of the Centers for Disease Control and Prevention =

Since 1980, the U.S. Centers for Disease Control and Prevention has been organized around constituent centers, institutes, and offices (CIOs). Five centers were created in 1980, which was reflected in CDC's contemporaneous name change from the singular "Center" to plural "Centers". The current centers are descended from these five, with the exception of the National Institute for Occupational Safety and Health and National Center for Health Statistics, which were absorbed from outside CDC and have much longer histories.

During 1980–2005, the CIOs were in a flat structure reporting directly to the CDC Director. In 2005, they were collected into four Coordinating Centers in a matrix organization framework as part of the CDC Futures Initiative, which was intended to increase CDC's efficiency after the 1999 West Nile virus outbreak, 2001 anthrax attacks, and 2002–2004 SARS outbreak. However, in 2009 the Coordinating Centers were replaced with leaner Deputy Director offices. In 2023, the CDC Moving Forward initiative following the COVID-19 pandemic returned to a flat structure.

== History of overall organization ==
=== Early history and creation of individual centers ===
From its establishment in 1946 until 1980, CDC's organization was mainly oriented around a functional framework of epidemiology, laboratory, and training divisions. During this time, the number of top-level divisions ranged between four and twelve.

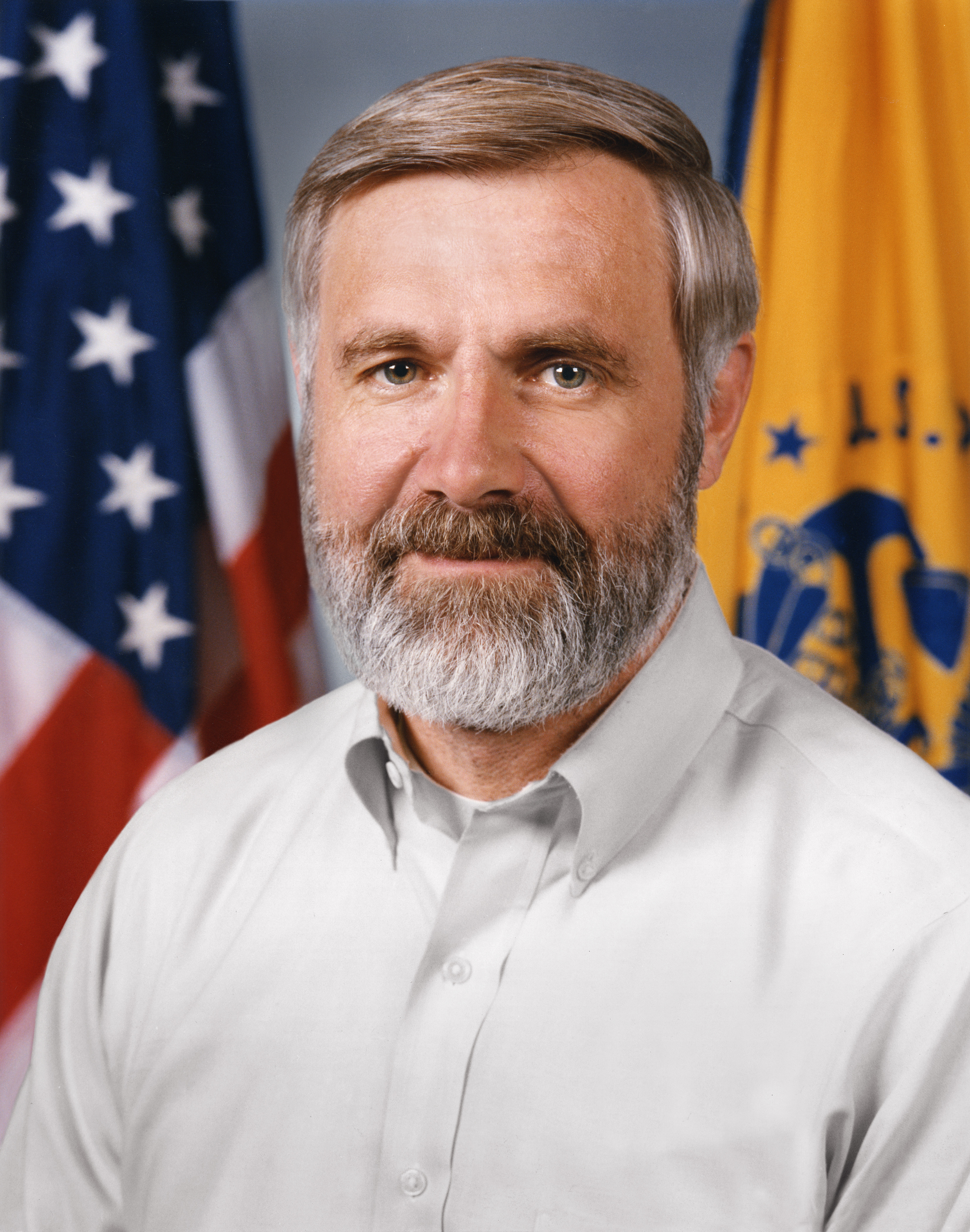
CDC Director William Foege spearheaded the creation of individual centers within CDC

Organization of CDC in 1999

CDC's modern organization of having multiple constituent centers, institutes, and offices (CIOs) was established in 1980, at the same time its name changed from the singular "Center for Disease Control" to plural "Centers for Disease Control". The 1980 reorganization replaced the functional framework with an outcome-oriented one, and allowed expansion into areas other than communicable disease. The new organization was spearheaded by CDC Director William Foege and inspired by Health Canada's organization, which was divided into biological, environmental, lifestyle, and medical care divisions.

Five centers were established in 1980:

- The Center for Infectious Diseases was largely created from merging the pre-existing Laboratory Bureau and Epidemiology Bureau.
- The Center for Environmental Health was an outgrowth of CDC's heavy involvement in recent environmental health incidents such as chemical contamination in Triana, Alabama and Love Canal, the Three Mile Island nuclear accident, and the eruption of Mount St. Helens; it also inherited existing programs in rat control, lead, dental disease, cancer clusters, and birth defects.
- The Center for Health Promotion and Education incorporated programs in lifestyle studies, nutrition, family planning, and anti-smoking activities.
- The Center for Prevention Services and the Center for Professional Development and Training inherited CDC's traditional service functions.

Additionally, two centers were absorbed by CDC from outside during this period:

- The National Institute for Occupational Safety and Health (NIOSH), whose predecessor organization dated back to 1914, had been absorbed by CDC in 1973.
- The National Center for Health Statistics, whose earliest predecessor dated back to 1899, was absorbed into CDC in 1987.

=== Futures Initiative ===
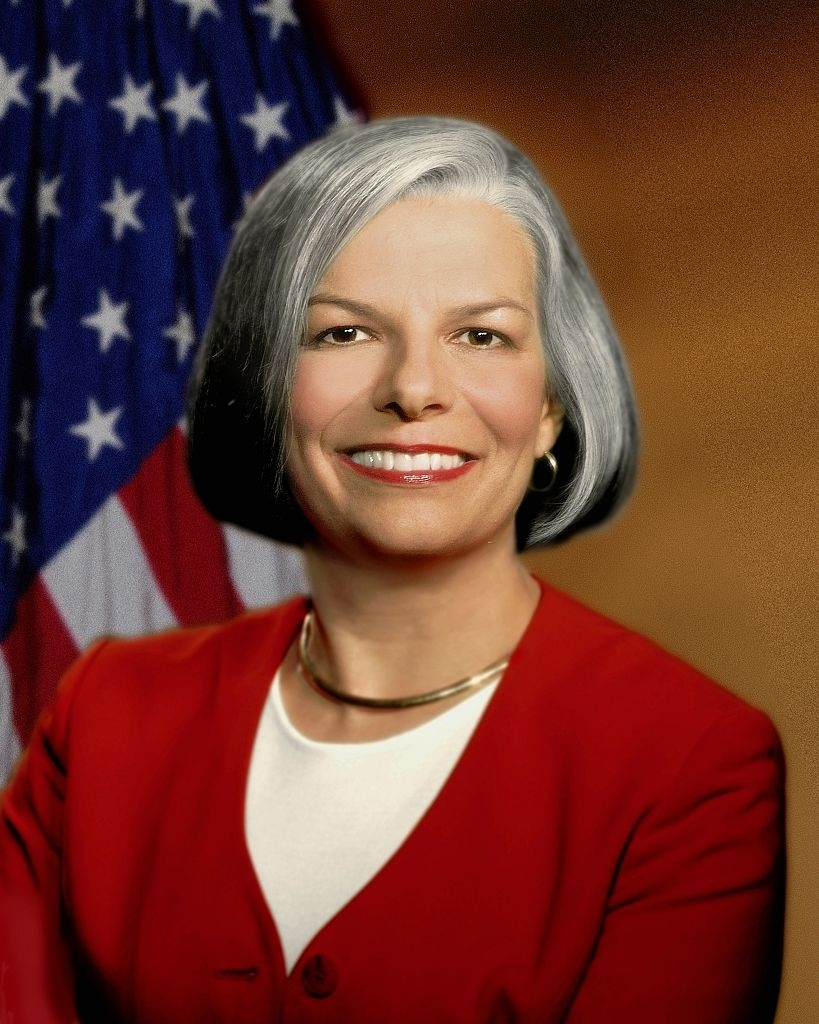
CDC Director Julie Gerberding spearheaded the Futures Initiative, which collected the CIOs into four Coordinating Centers in a matrix organization structure.

CDC's Futures Initiative began in 2003 and was spearheaded by CDC Director Julie Gerberding. It was partially in response to criticism of the agency's response to the 1999 West Nile virus outbreak, the 2001 anthrax attacks, and the 2002–2004 SARS outbreak. It was also noted that these emergency response activities were putting pressures on the CDC Director's time, who also was responsible for to directly overseeing all 11 CIOs.

The strategic planning involved a broadly deliberative process seeking input from employees, partners, and other stakeholders for selecting strategic objectives. It emphasized preparedness as well as health promotion and disease prevention, and also streamlined the funding process for grants to state and local health departments. It reoriented CDC around a matrix organization structure that was less hierarchical, which was intended to prevent silos and enhance organizational flexibility and information sharing.

Organization of CDC in 2007, with the Coordinating Centers

The reorganization became official in April 2005. The existing CDC centers were collected into four Coordinating Centers:

- Coordinating Center for Infectious Diseases
- Coordinating Center for Environmental Health and Injury Prevention
- Coordinating Center for Health Promotion
- Coordinating Center for Health Information and Service

During this time, there were three independent CIOs: the Coordinating Office for Global Health, the newly formed Coordinating Office for Terrorism Preparedness and Emergency Response, and NIOSH.

There were negative effects in the immediate aftermath of the reorganization, including unpopularity with employees, low morale, and loss of long-term staff. Because many of CDC's leaders were scientists rather than managers, their aversion to the administrative burden of a reorganization led to its perceived failure. In December 2005, five former CDC directors sent Gerberding a letter expressing concern about the reorganization.

=== Later history ===
Organization of CDC in 2015, with three deputy directors

Organization of CDC in 2021, with four deputy directors

The Coordinating Centers were abolished in 2009 by new CDC Director Tom Frieden. Centers were instead placed under Deputy Director offices, which were much leaner than the former Coordinating Centers. For example, the Coordinating Center for Infectious Diseases had 600 employees, while the Office of Infectious Diseases had 12. There were initially three Deputy Director offices, which was increased to four in 2018:

- The Deputy Director for Infectious Diseases succeeded the Coordinating Center for Infectious Diseases.
- The Deputy Director for Noncommunicable Diseases, Injury, and Environmental Health (later Deputy Director for Non-Infectious Diseases) succeeded the Coordinating Center for Environmental Health and Injury Prevention, and the Coordinating Center for Health Promotion.
- The Deputy Director for Public Health Scientific Services (later Deputy Director for Public Health Science and Surveillance) succeeded the Coordinating Center for Health Information and Service.
- The Deputy Director for Public Health Service and Implementation Science was created in 2018, absorbing three CIOs that had been independent since the 2009 reorganization.

Organization of CDC in 2024, after the CDC Moving Forward reorganization

The CDC Moving Forward reorganization occurred in 2023 as a response to lessons learned from CDC's response to the COVID-19 pandemic. The Deputy Director level was removed, returning CDC to a flat structure. The reorganization did not otherwise organizationally affect the infectious disease and non-infectious disease centers, Global Health Center, and NIOSH. However, two centers were merged, while the other five CIOs were absorbed into the Office of the Director.

== Organizational history of current CIOs ==
=== Infectious disease centers ===
Three current centers were placed under the Coordinating Office for Infectious Diseases and later the Deputy Director for Infectious Diseases.

- The National Center for Emerging and Zoonotic Infectious Diseases is an indirect successor to the Center for Infectious Diseases, one of the original centers established in 1980. In 2007, as part of the Futures Initiative, the Center for Infectious Diseases was split into the National Center for Zoonotic, Vectorborne, and Enteric Diseases; and the National Center for Preparedness, Detection, and Control of Infectious Diseases. In 2009, these two centers were realigned, with their programs moved into the new National Center for Emerging and Zoonotic Infectious Diseases or the Center for Global Health, as well as other parts of CDC.
- The National Center for HIV/AIDS, Viral Hepatitis, STD and TB Prevention is the successor to Center for Prevention Services, one of the original centers established in 1980. It became the National Center for HIV, STD, and TB Prevention in 1996.
- The National Center for Immunization and Respiratory Diseases was spun off from the Center for Prevention Services in 1993 as the National Immunization Program. It gained its current name in 2006 as part of the Futures Initiative.

=== Non-infectious disease centers ===
Four current centers were placed under either the Coordinating Center for Environmental Health and Injury Prevention, or the Coordinating Center for Health Promotion. They were later under the Deputy Director for Non-Infectious Diseases.

- The National Center for Chronic Disease Prevention and Health Promotion is one of the original centers established in 1980. It was originally the Center for Health Promotion and Education, and gained its current name by 1990.
- The National Center for Environmental Health (NCEH) is one of the original centers established in 1980.
- The National Center for Injury Prevention and Control was spun off from NCEH in 1992 due to the Injury Control Act of 1990.
- The National Center on Birth Defects and Developmental Disabilities was spun off from NCEH in 2001 due to the Children's Health Act of 2000.

=== Other CIOs ===
- The National Institute for Occupational Safety and Health's earliest predecessor was formed in 1914, and became NIOSH in 1971 as a result of the Occupational Safety and Health Act of 1970. It was absorbed into CDC in 1973 at the end of the Public Health Service reorganizations of 1966–1973.
- The Public Health Infrastructure Center was formed from merges of several programs in 1986, 2013, and 2023. Its earliest predecessor was the Center for Professional Development and Training, one of the original centers established in 1980. Around 1986 it merged with the Laboratory Program Office to form the Training and Laboratory Program Office, which was renamed the Public Health Practice Program Office in 1989. In 2013, this and four other program offices collectively covering surveillance, epidemiology, informatics, laboratory science, and career development merged into the Center for Surveillance, Epidemiology and Laboratory Services. In 2023, as part of CDC Moving Forward, the Public Health Infrastructure Center was formed through a merge with the Center for State, Tribal, Local and Territorial Support, which had been formed in 2009 and called the Office of State and Local Support until 2018.
- The Global Health Center is the successor to the International Health Program Office established in 1980.
- The Office of the Director has several components that were formerly CIOs, but were moved into the Office of the Director as part of the CDC Moving Forward reorganization in 2023: the Office of Science, the Office of Laboratory Science and Safety, the National Center for Health Statistics, the Office of Health Equity, and the Office of Readiness and Response.
  - The National Center for Health Statistics' earliest predecessor was founded in 1899 as part of the initial establishment of internal divisions within PHS's predecessor, the Marine Hospital Service. It gained its current name in 1960 and was absorbed into CDC in 1987.
  - The Office of Readiness and Response is the successor to the Office of Terrorism Preparedness and Emergency Response created in August 2002.
