= Daniel B. Jernigan =

American physician and public health official

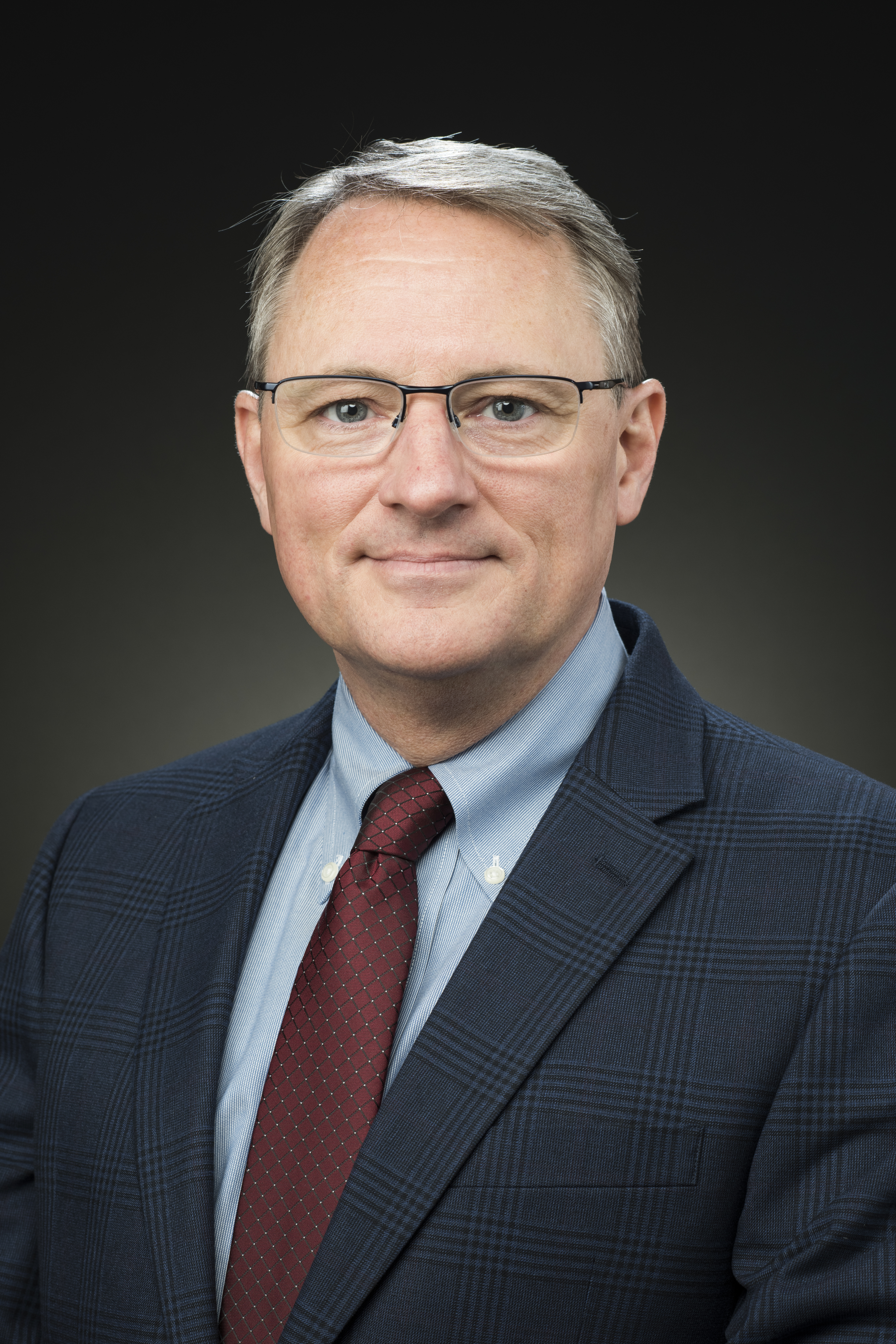
- Born: 1963 (age 62–63); Fort Benning, Georgia, U.S.
- Education: Duke University (BS); Baylor College of Medicine (MD); University of Texas School of Public Health (MPH)
- Occupations: Physician; public health official
- Employer(s): Centers for Disease Control and Prevention (CDC) (career); consultant (post-CDC)
- Known for: Infectious disease outbreak response; surveillance; pandemic preparedness
- Uniformed service
- Allegiance: United States
- Branch: United States Public Health Service Commissioned Corps
- Service years: 1996–2019
- Rank: Captain

Daniel B. Jernigan is an American physician, public health leader, and retired Captain with the United States Public Health Service. Jernigan is known for his work in infectious disease detection, outbreak readiness and response, and public health surveillance. He served thirty-one years at the U.S. Centers for Disease Control and Prevention (CDC) in leadership roles including director of the National Center for Emerging and Zoonotic Infectious Diseases (NCEZID), CDC deputy director for public health science and surveillance, and director of CDC's Influenza Division. He received the 2019 Samuel J. Heyman Service to America Medal (Science and Environment) for his public health service.

== Education ==
Jernigan earned a Bachelor of Science degree from Duke University, and later completed combined medical and public health training, receiving an MD from Baylor College of Medicine and an MPH from the University of Texas School of Public Health. He completed residency training in internal medicine and preventive medicine, and he completed a fellowship in CDC's Epidemic Intelligence Service (EIS).

== Career ==
After completing EIS in CDC's Division of Bacterial and Mycotic Diseases, Jernigan worked as a CDC epidemiologist assigned to the Washington State Department of Health from 1996 to 1999 addressing emerging infections and antimicrobial-resistant infections. Jernigan later moved to CDC's National Center for Infectious Diseases, where he developed and implemented national standards for electronic laboratory reporting for notifiable infectious disease surveillance.

Jernigan subsequently served as Epidemiology Section Chief for CDC's Division of Healthcare Quality Promotion. Media coverage and reports described investigations involving healthcare-associated, antimicrobial-resistant, and transplant-associated infections.

Beginning in 2006, Jernigan joined CDC's Influenza Division and from 2015 to 2021 served as director of the division, overseeing prevention and control of human, swine, and avian influenza infections in the U.S. and globally. Media reports from this period described his work during severe flu seasons and the 2009 influenza A(H1N1) pandemic. Jernigan led developments of surveillance and response innovations including the International Reagent Resource (IRR) for sharing test materials globally, and the Influenza Risk Assessment Tool which later was used for the WHO Tool for Influenza Pandemic Risk Assessment.

In 2021, Jernigan became CDC's deputy director for public health science and surveillance overseeing the agency's Data Modernization Initiative. He finished his career at CDC as director of the National Center for Emerging and Zoonotic Infectious Diseases from 2023 to 2025. In August 2025, news organizations reported that Jernigan was among senior CDC leaders who resigned following the removal of CDC director Susan Monarez.

== Publications ==
Jernigan has authored over 160 peer-reviewed manuscripts and book chapters on bacterial, viral, and fungal diseases and on innovations for infectious diseases surveillance and public health informatics.

== Outbreak investigations ==
Jernigan has led over 60 infectious disease outbreaks and public health responses Examples include:

=== Legionnaires’ disease ===
Jernigan served as lead officer for an investigation of fatal pneumonia among cruise ship passengers which identified recreational whirlpool spas as a source of transmission. This work led to changes in federal vessel sanitation requirements and inspections.

=== Bioterrorism-related anthrax ===
Jernigan served as the lead for the CDC's Epidemiology Team in the Emergency Operations Center during the 2001 investigation into bioterrorism-related anthrax cases. Later reports describe how this effort informed and improved emergency responses subsequently facing CDC.

=== Severe acute respiratory syndrome (SARS) in Taiwan ===
Jernigan led a team supporting the Taiwan Centers for Disease Control in 2003. Reports described the importance of adherence to infection control in stopping spread of SARS.

=== Infections from organ and tissue transplantation ===
Jernigan supervised CDC teams investigating fatal transplant-associated infections due to rabies, West Nile virus (WNV), lymphocytic choriomeningitis virus (LCMV), and fatal Clostridium infections associated with cadaveric tissue allografts. Descriptions of investigations and subsequent changes to oversight and regulation have been reported.

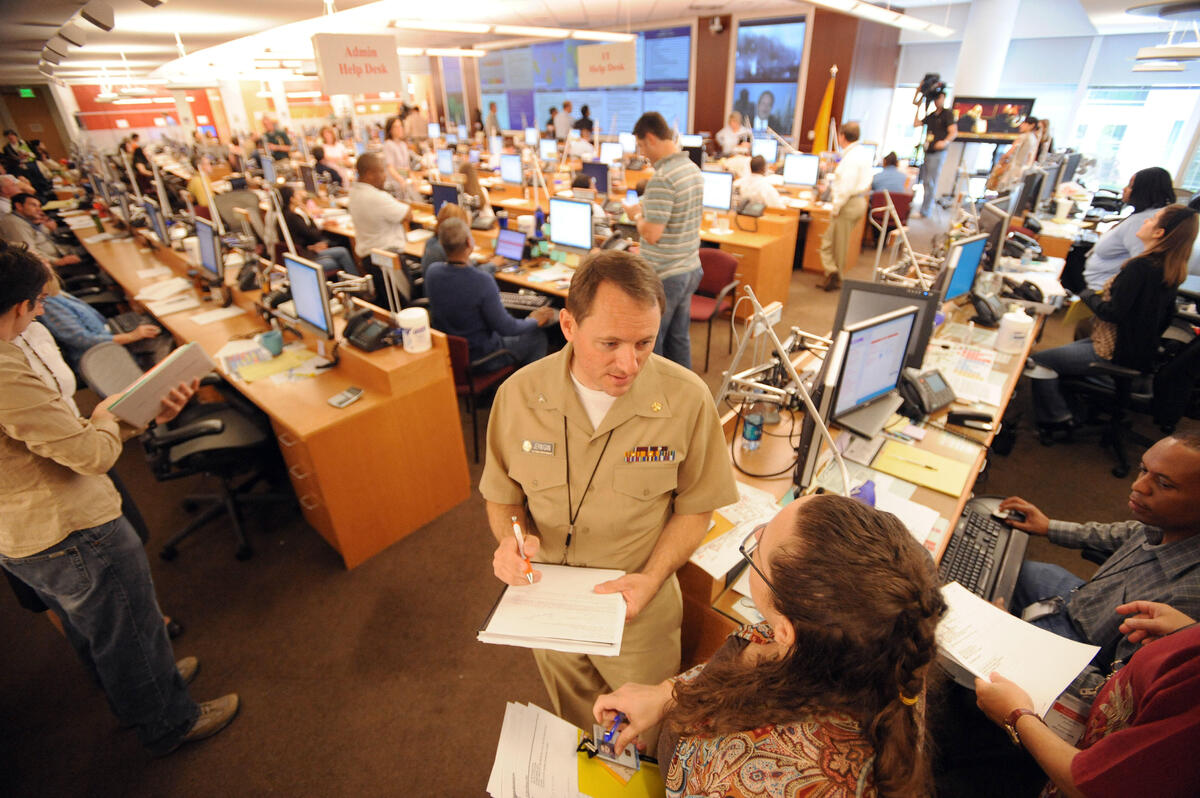
Jernigan in CDC’s Emergency Operations Center for the 2009 H1N1 influenza pandemic response.

=== Human, swine, avian, and pandemic influenza ===
Jernigan served for 15 years in CDC's Influenza Division as deputy director and later director. During the response to the emerging influenza A(H1N1) pandemic virus, he led a task force responsible for outbreak response, epidemiology, surveillance, laboratory, international coordination, modelling, and other workstreams. Scientific reports described rapid characterisation of the virus and rapid development and deployment of tests by CDC. Jernigan subsequently served as lead, Avian Influenza H7N9 Epidemiology and Laboratory Task Force, overseeing teams monitoring influenza A(H7N9) infections spreading in China in 2013.

=== Ebola, West Africa ===
In 2014–2015, Jernigan served in leadership roles in CDC's Ebola response, including in Sierra Leone and as overall incident manager for CDC's global response. Reports describe the Freetown, Sierra Leone efforts with “Operation Western Area Surge” in stopping the Western African Ebola epidemic in Sierra Leone.

=== COVID-19 pandemic ===
Jernigan served as incident manager for CDC's global response to COVID-19 and later served as CDC's lead official to the FEMA/HHS National Response Coordination Center (NRCC). A FEMA after-action assessment describes the NRCC's central coordinating role during March 2020.

Daniel B. Jernigan
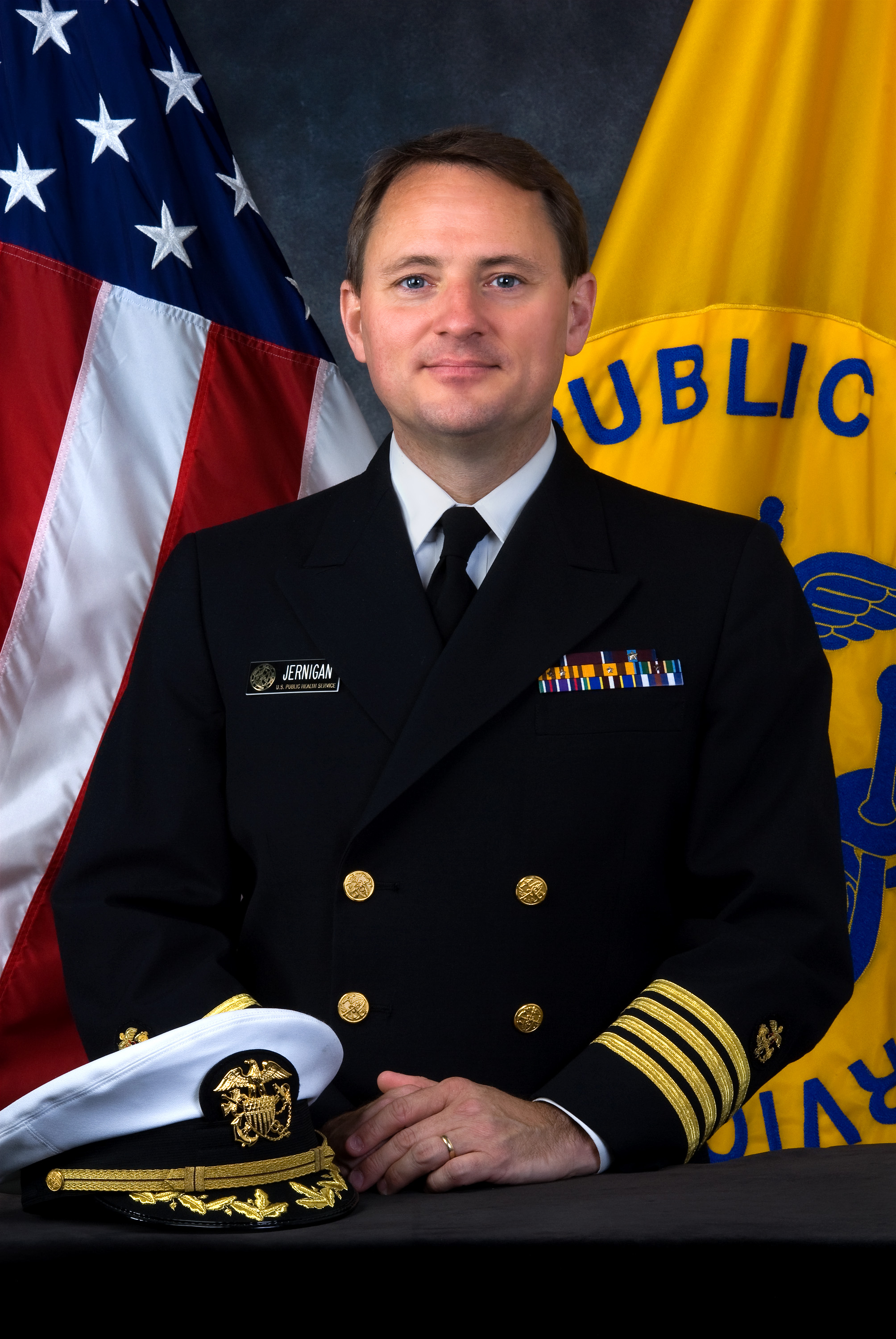
- Military career
- Allegiance: United States of America
- Branch: U.S. Public Health Service
- Rank: Captain
- Unit: USPHS Commissioned Corps
- Awards: USPHS Distinguished Service Medal; USPHS Commendation Medal; USPHS Achievement Medal; Presidential Unit Citation (United States); USPHS Outstanding Unit Citation; USPHS Unit Commendation; USPHS Ebola Campaign Medal; USPHS Crisis Response Service Award; USPHS Global Response Service Award; USPHS Bicentennial Unit Commendation; USPHS Regular Corps Ribbon; USPHS Commissioned Officers Association ribbon

== Awards ==
Jernigan received the 2019 Samuel J. Heyman Service to America Medal (Science and Environment) for contributions to pandemic preparedness, surveillance innovations, and outbreak response. For work related to public health data systems, he received a HIMSS Changemaker in Health Award (Policy Influencer, 2023). Jernigan received awards and decorations during his 23 years in the United States Public Health Service.
