= Fernando Torres-Gil =

American policymaker

Fernando M. Torres-Gil

1st Assistant Secretary for Aging
- In office May 6, 1993 – December 8, 1997
- President: Bill Clinton
- Preceded by: Position established
- Succeeded by: Jeanette Takamura

Personal details
- Party: Democratic
- Education: San Jose State University

Fernando Torres-Gil graduated from San Jose State University in 1970 with a BA in political science, PhD, was the first Assistant Secretary for Aging at the Administration on Aging within the U.S. Department of Health and Human Services. He served as a White House Fellow in 1978-79. He was appointed by President Clinton in 1993 and served in the position until 1997. Currently, Torres-Gil sits on the National Council on Disability as an appointee of President Obama. He is the Associate Dean of Academic Affairs and Professor of Social Welfare and Public Policy at the UCLA Luskin School of Public Affairs. He is the Director of the UCLA Center for Policy Research on Aging and is a member of the AARP Board of Directors. Torres-Gil also holds the position of Adjunct Professor of Gerontology at the USC Davis School of Gerontology, having served as Professor of Gerontology and Public Administration at USC before moving to UCLA. In December 2022, Torres-Gil as a fellow by the American Academy of Social Work and Social Welfare for 2023.
