= Katherine D. Seelman =

Katherine Dolores Seelman is an American academic, focused on science, technology and public policy, especially telecommunications and accessibility. An Associate Dean and Professor at the University of Pittsburgh School of Health and Rehabilitation Sciences, she is co-scientific director of the Quality of Life Technology Engineering Research Center, supported by the National Science Foundation, and was formerly the director of the National Institute on Disability and Rehabilitation Research. Seelman has been part of a number of advisory and editorial committees, including helping the World Health Organization develop the first world report on disability as one of nine international advisors in 2006. In Pennsylvania, she is a member of the Pennsylvania State Technology Healthcare Working Group and an appointed member of the State Advisory Committee on Disability. Seelman, who is hearing impaired, co-chairs the City of Pittsburgh/Allegheny County Task Force on Disability.

Seelman, who earned her doctorate in public policy from New York University in 1982, has received numerous awards including the Gold Key Award from the American Congress of Rehabilitation Medicine, the Distinguished Public Service Award from the American Academy of Physical Medicine and Rehabilitation, the Outstanding Public Service Award from the Association of Academic Physiatrists, and the "Person Who Made a Difference" designation in 2002 by Pittsburgh Post-Gazette.

== Select recent publications ==
- Seelman, KD. (2007). "Trends in Disability: Transition from a Medical Model to an Integrative Model." In Reynolds, CR & Fletcher-Janzen, E. Encyclopedia of Special Education. New York: John Wiley & Sons, Inc.
- Seelman, KD., Brabyn, J., Ortman, A. and Palmer, C. (2006 ). "Sensory Aids." Encyclopedia of Bioengineering, John Wiley & Sons, Inc., Hoboken, NJ.
- Seelman, KD. (2005). "Universal Design and Orphan Technology: Do We need Both?" Disability Studies Quarterly. 25 (3). Summer 2005.
