= Administration on Intellectual and Developmental Disabilities =

United States federal agency

The Administration on Disabilities (AoD) is the United States federal agency responsible for implementation and administration of the Developmental Disabilities Assistance and Bill of Rights Act of 2000 (DD Act) and the disability provisions of the Help America Vote Act. Organizationally, the Administration on Developmental Disabilities is located within the U.S. Department of Health and Human Services and is part of the Department's Administration for Children and Families. In 2012, ADD was included in the newly formed Administration for Community Living.

ADD's mission is to improve and increase services to and assure that individuals with developmental disabilities have opportunities to make their own choices, contribute to society, have supports to live independently, and are free of abuse, neglect, financial and sexual exploitation, and violations of their legal and human rights.
