= National Institute on Disability, Independent Living, and Rehabilitation Research =

United States governmental agency

Agency overview
- Preceding agencies: National Institute on Disability and Rehabilitation Research; National Institute on Handicapped Research
- Parent department: Health and Human Services
- Parent agency: Administration for Community Living
- Website: www.acl.gov/programs/NIDILRR/

The National Institute on Disability, Independent Living, and Rehabilitation Research (NIDILRR) is a United States governmental agency that provides leadership and support for a comprehensive program of research related to the rehabilitation of individuals with disabilities. NIDILRR's mission is to generate new knowledge and promote its effective use to improve the abilities of people with disabilities to perform activities of their choice in the community, and also to expand society's capacity to provide full opportunities and accommodations for its citizens with disabilities.

== History ==
It was previously the National Institute on Disability and Rehabilitation Research, part of the Office of Special Education and Rehabilitative Services (OSERS), in the Department of Education.

In 2015, as a result of the Workforce Innovation and Opportunity Act, the organization became part of the Administration for Community Living (ACL), within the Department of Health and Human Services, and changed to its current name.

== Directors of NIDRR/NIDILRR ==
Directors of the Institute are appointed by the President and confirmed by the Senate.

- Margaret Giannini (1980–1981)
- Douglas A. Fenderson (1983–1985)
- David B. Gray (1986–1987)
- William H. Graves (1990–1991)
- Katherine D. Seelman (−1999)
- Steven J. Tingus (2001–)
- K. Charlie Lakin (2011–)
- John Tschida (−2017)
- Jim Whitehead (2019)
- Anjali Forber-Pratt (appointed June 2021)
