= Lance Allen Robertson =

American army veteran, university administrator, and government official (born 1971)

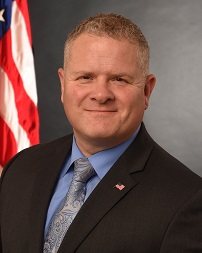

Assistant Secretary of Health and Human Services for Aging
- In office August 11, 2017 – January 20, 2021
- President: Donald Trump
- Preceded by: Kathy Greenlee
- Succeeded by: vacant

Personal details
- Born: March 16, 1971 (age 54)
- Spouse: Lori
- Children: 2
- Education: Oklahoma State University; University of Central Oklahoma

Lance Allen Robertson (born March 16, 1971) is a United States Army veteran, university administrator, and government official who formerly served as Assistant Secretary of Health and Human Services (Aging). Prior to assuming his current role, he served as Oklahoma's Director of Aging Services from 2007 through 2017. Robertson was previously an administrator at Oklahoma State University, executive director of PartnerShips for Aging, and president of the National Association of States United for Aging and Disabilities. Robertson currently serves as partner of Guidehouse.

== Biography ==
Robertson was raised by his grandparents in Wellston, Oklahoma. He received a B.S. in business at Oklahoma State University in 1993 and a Master's of Public Administration from the University of Central Oklahoma in 2015. Robertson is a veteran of the United States Army.

Robertson co-founded the Gerontology Institute at Oklahoma State University, serving as its director from February 1994 to June 2005. He has also served as executive director of PartnerShips for Aging, a gerontology association. In June 2007, Robertson became Oklahoma's Director of Aging Services. He served in that position until being confirmed as Assistant Secretary of Health and Human Services (Aging) in August 2017. He has also served as the president of the National Association of States United for Aging and Disabilities.
