= Administration for Community Living =

U.S. government program to assist aging, disabled people

Agency overview
- Formed: April 18, 2012; 14 years ago
- Jurisdiction: Federal government of the United States
- Headquarters: Mary E. Switzer Memorial Building Washington, DC
- Annual budget: US$1.7 billion (2015 FY)
- Agency executives: Vacant, Administrator; Rick Nicholls, Principal Deputy Administrator
- Parent department: United States Department of Health and Human Services
- Child agencies: Administration on Aging; Administration on Disabilities; National Institute on Disability, Independent Living, and Rehabilitation Research; Center for Integrated Programs; Center for Management and Budget; Center for Policy and Evaluation
- Website: acl.gov

The Administration for Community Living (ACL) is part of the U.S. Department of Health and Human Services (HHS). It is headed by the administrator and assistant secretary for aging, who reports directly to the secretary of health and human services. ACL's Principal Deputy Administrator serves as Senior Advisor to the HHS Secretary for Disability Policy.

As part of the announced 2025 HHS reorganization, ACL is planned to be broken up, with components moving into the existing Administration for Children and Families and Centers for Medicare and Medicaid Services, and the new Office of Strategy.

== Organization ==
ACL is structured to provide general policy coordination while retaining programmatic operations specific to the needs of each population served. ACL is divided into the following units:

- Office of the Administrator
- Administration on Aging (AoA)
- Administration on Disabilities (AoD)
- National Institute on Disability, Independent Living, and Rehabilitation Research (NIDILRR)
- Center for Integrated Programs (CIP)
- Center for Management and Budget (CMB)
- Center for Policy and Evaluation (CPE)

== History ==
ACL was created in 2012 to bring together the Administration on Aging, the Office on Disability, and the Administration on Developmental Disabilities. In a number of bills passed by Congress during 2013–2015, other components were transferred into it from the Centers for Medicare & Medicaid Services, Centers for Disease Control and Prevention, Health Resources and Services Administration, and Department of Education.

Under the announced 2025 HHS reorganization, ACL is planned to be broken up, with components moving into the Administration for Children and Families, Centers for Medicare and Medicaid Services, and the new HHS Office of Strategy.

== See also ==
- President's Committee for People with Intellectual Disabilities
