= Division of Global Migration Health =

U.S. government agency

Division of Global Health
Agency overview
- Preceding agency: Division of Global Migration and Quarantine
- Jurisdiction: United States
- Agency executive: Captain David Fitter, MD, Director of Division of Global Migration Health
- Parent department: National Center for Emerging and Zoonotic Infectious Diseases
- Parent agency: The Centers for Disease Control and Prevention
- Website: https://www.cdc.gov/ncezid/divisions-offices/about-dgmh.html

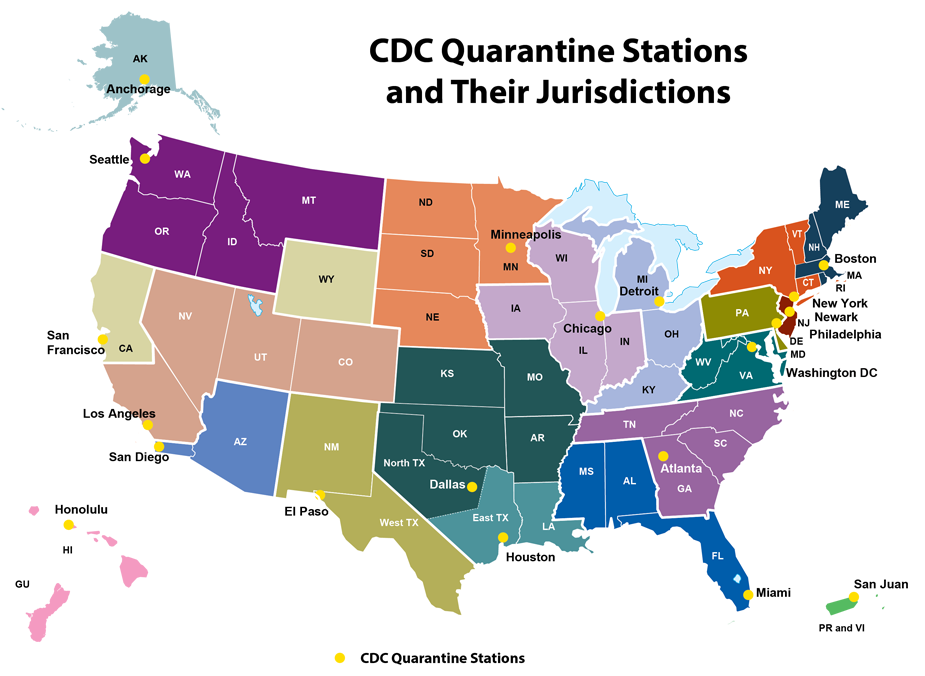
Quarantine Stations

The Division of Global Migration Health (DGMH), formerly the Division of Global Migration and Quarantine is the part of the U.S. government responsible for U.S. Quarantine Stations and issuing quarantine orders. It is part of the National Center for Emerging and Zoonotic Infectious Diseases within the Centers for Disease Control and Prevention (CDC).

The U.S. Quarantine Stations work at 20 major ports of entry where most international travelers arrive, to help prevent contagious diseases from entering and spreading through the United States. Because of US federal regulations, pilots of ships and planes must report to CDC any illnesses and deaths before arriving into the United States. Quarantine public health officers work with U.S. Customs and Border Protection and emergency medical services to also detect sick travelers entering the country. Quarantine officers also screen imported animals and biologics to ensure safety from diseases dangerous to humans.

== History ==
Until the 1870s, quarantines were under state and local control. In 1879, the federal government established a National Board of Health with national quarantine authority. It contained equal representation from the three government organizations with medical officers: the Army, the Navy, and the Marine Hospital Service. In 1883, the law authorizing the National Board of Health expired, and quarantine authority devolved solely to the Marine Hospital Service.

In 1899, the Marine Hospital Service split itself into divisions for the first time, and the Division of Foreign Quarantine was created. The Marine Hospital Service changed its name to the Public Health Service (PHS) in 1912 to reflect its expanding scope. In 1943, PHS collected its divisions into three operating agencies, and the Division of Foreign Quarantine became part of its Bureau of Medical Services. The 1944 Public Health Service Act enacted the legislation regarding federal quarantine procedures that, with minor amendments, is still in effect as of 2021.

As part of the PHS reorganizations of 1966–1973, the Division of Foreign Quarantine was taken over by the Centers for Disease Control and Prevention (CDC) in 1967. At that time there were 55 quarantine stations, present in every port, international airport, and major border crossing. Because of the decline of communicable diseases throughout the twentieth century, the focus was shifted from routine inspections to program-level management, and the number of quarantine stations decreased to seven in 1995. This was the result of a belief that infectious diseases had largely been vanquished by antibiotics and vaccines, and that attention should be focused on chronic diseases such as cancer and heart disease.

In the late 1990s, there was growing recognition of factors that had increased the risk of infectious disease in the prior decades, including high-volume international travel, global urbanization and population growth, increased interaction between humans and wildlife, antimicrobial resistance, and bioterrorism concerns. In 2000, domestic interstate quarantine authority for humans was transferred from the Food and Drug Administration (FDA) to CDC, which FDA had had since the late 1960s, although FDA still retained domestic interstate quarantine authority over animals and other products. After the 2002–2004 SARS outbreak, CDC reorganized the system, creating the Division of Global Migration and Quarantine and expanding to 20 stations.

== Activities ==
U.S. Quarantine Stations are staffed with public health and medical officers from the Quarantine and Border Health Services Branch of the Division of Global Migration and Quarantine. They usually consist of a small group of staff, office space, and patient isolation rooms.

=== Human health ===
When illnesses are reported to CDC at ports of entry, quarantine officers are the first responders. They assess health situations with the goal of both protecting communities from disease spread and directing sick travelers to appropriate care. These officers decide whether sick travelers can enter the United States or continue to travel. Quarantine officers collect medical information from new arrivals, including immigrants, refugees, parolees, and asylees and inform local health departments in their destination locations about health issues that need follow-up.

Medical inadmissibility can be based on four conditions: a communicable disease of public health significance, a physical or mental disorder with harmful behavior, drug abuse or addiction, or, for immigrant visa applicants, lack of required vaccinations. These are further divided based on a physician panel into Class A conditions that require a waiver for admission, and Class B conditions do not preclude admission but require follow-up.

CDC works closely with airline and ship companies that transport people and cargo to the U.S. ports of entry. Quarantine officers coordinate with airlines, cruise lines, and port officials to investigate illness reports and track the spread of disease. For example, if a sick passenger is on a flight, CDC will work with the airlines, U.S. Customs and Border Protection, and health departments or international ministries of health to contact travelers who were exposed to the sick person as per CDC's disease protocols. This is known as a contact investigation.

Certain quarantine stations respond to emergency requests from hospitals to provide certain unavailable emergency drugs for botulism, malaria, and diphtheria. Quarantine officers also work with port partners to plan and prepare emergency responses and for mass migration emergencies.

==== Quarantinable diseases ====
As a federal agency under the US Department of Human and Health Services, CDC can legally detain, medically examine, and release a person who may have a contagious disease that is quarantinable. Quarantinable diseases are determined by Executive Order of the US President. As of 2020 there are nine quarantinable diseases:

- Cholera
- Diphtheria
- Infectious tuberculosis
- Plague
- Smallpox
- Yellow fever
- Viral hemorrhagic fevers (such as Ebola)
- Severe acute respiratory syndromes (such as SARS, MERS, and COVID-19)
- Types of flu (influenza virus) that could cause a pandemic

Several vaccine-controllable diseases are not on the list, including measles, mumps, rubella, and chickenpox.

Based on their health assessments, quarantine officers may stop travelers from entering the United States or from continuing to travel, or send them to a hospital for treatment, or connect with a local or state health department for follow up.

=== Cargo ===
Quarantine officers routinely monitor animals and cargo entering the United States that may pose a risk to public health. They inspect live animals, including dogs, cats, monkeys, bats, turtles, ticks, mosquitoes, snails, and civets. CDC also regulates the import of animal products like bushmeat, hunting trophies, untanned goat skin drums, and uncured leather. Biological research samples, blood and tissue samples, and human remains are also screened for disease.

== Locations ==
The 20 Quarantine Stations are located at major ports of entry where most international travelers enter the country. Two stations, El Paso and San Diego, are located at land-border crossings, while the other 18 are at international airports. Each station is responsible for all the ports of entry in its assigned region, in addition to the major port where it is located.

- Anchorage
- Atlanta
- Boston
- Chicago
- Dallas
- Detroit
- El Paso
- Honolulu
- Houston
- Los Angeles
- Miami
- Minneapolis
- New York
- Newark
- Philadelphia
- San Diego
- San Francisco
- San Juan
- Seattle
- Washington, D.C.
