= Wilma T. Donahue =

American gerontologist (1900–1993)

- Born: 1900; Mitchellville, Iowa, United States
- Died: August 17, 1993 (aged 92–93); Ann Arbor, Michigan, United States
- Occupation(s): Gerontologist, clinical psychologist, educator
- Awards: Clark Tibbitts Award, Michigan Women's Hall of Fame

Academic background
- Education: University of Michigan

Academic work
- Era: 1935–1970
- Discipline: Gerontology
- Sub-discipline: Social gerontology

Wilma Thompson Donahue (1900 – August 17, 1993) was an American gerontologist, educator, and author focusing on social gerontology and the psychological aspects of aging. Donahue was among the first clinical psychologists in the United States. She has been described by the University of Michigan as having "sought to elicit the truth about old people, especially those distressed in mind, body, or estate" and by Michigan Women Forward as "one of those rare individuals who can work successfully in academic, research, and public policy areas."

== Biography ==
Donahue was born in Mitchellville, Iowa, in 1900, growing up on a farm. She began taking college preparatory classes while in high school and normal teacher training. She later studied at the University of Michigan. She began her work as a clinical psychologist in 1935, working in the Student Health Service. Donahue received her doctorate in 1937 and began teaching the following year.

Together with Clark Tibbitts at the University of Michigan's Institute for Human Adjustment, she placed an emphasis on the importance of gerontology education. They founded a gerontology program at the University of Michigan, the Annual Conference on Aging, as well as held conferences and radio talks on the topic. Several important works on gerontology at the time, Aging in Western Societies (Ernest W. Burgess), Handbook of Aging and the Individual (James E. Birren), and Handbook of Social Gerontology (Clark Tibbitts), were published due to her efforts. Her focus on education led her to establish educational programs in the 1960s which reached thousands.

Donahue spoke to the public and lawmakers alike. She was a member of the Michigan Governor's Commission on Aging and participated in White House Conferences on Aging; she was a member of policy boards on aging under a number of presidents.

One issue she focused on was the importance of self-sufficiency for the elderly. She argued that the elderly should be allowed to continue to work at the capacity in which they are able rather than relying solely on retirement benefits. Also, at a time when gerontology focused primarily on men's experiences in retirement, Donahue noted the lack of significant research into women's experiences, which could be quite different.

When the University of Michigan founded its Division of Gerontology in 1951, Donahue was its first chairperson. She was also the co-director of the Institute of Gerontology upon its founding in 1965 and until 1969. Donahue retired from the university in 1970, moving to Washington, D.C. She founded the International Center for Social Gerontology there and expanded it to Michigan upon moving back in 1981. She was the organization's director for 10 years.

Donahue died in Ann Arbor, Michigan, on August 17, 1993.

=== Awards and legacy ===
In 1980, Donahue and Tibbitts were the first recipients of the Gerontological Society of America's Academy for Gerontology in Higher Education Award, now known as the Clark Tibbitts Award. It is awarded to people who have "made a national impact on gerontology and/or geriatrics education, have had significant involvement in gerontology and/or geriatrics education, and have advanced the goals and mission of the Academy for Gerontology in Higher Education".

She was among the first to be inducted into the Michigan Women's Hall of Fame in 1983, receiving the Life Achievement Award.

Other awards include:

- Honorary degree, St. Thomas Institute for Advanced Studies (1965)
- Achievement Award, Gerontological Society of America (1969)
- Honorary degree, Western Michigan University (1970)
- Ollie Randall Award, National Council on Aging (1982)
- Leadership award, Association for Gerontology in Higher Education (1988)

== Writings ==
Donahue wrote and edited a number of works on gerontology; her 1955 Education for Later Maturity has been called "the first major work to identify the educational needs of the aging person" and "one of the earliest comprehensive surveys of older learners." Some works include:

- Donahue, Wilma T.; Tibbitts, Clark, eds. (1945). The disabled veteran. Philadelphia: American Academy of Political and Social Science. OCLC 911742147.
- Donahue, Wilma T.; Tibbitts, Clark, eds. (1950). Planning the older years. Ann Arbor: University of Michigan Press. OCLC 776716668.
- Education for Later Maturity. Donahue, Wilma T (compiler). New York: Whiteside, Inc., and W. Morrow. 1955. OCLC 752615.
- Donahue, Wilma T., ed. (1958). Free time; challenge to later maturity. University of Michigan Conference on Aging. Ann Arbor: University of Michigan Press. OCLC 639976699.
- Donahue, Wilma T.; Tibbitts, Clark, eds. (1962). Politics of age. 14th Conference on Aging, 1961. University of Michigan. OCLC 1086822715.
- Donahue, Wilma, T. (1965). Management of public housing for the elderly; background readings: a collection of papers by Wilma Donahue [and others]. National Association of Housing and Redevelopment Officials. OCLC 1086741647.
- Coons, Dorothy H.; Donahue, Wilma; Gottesman, Leonard E. (1969). A therapeutic milieu for geriatric patients. Ann Arbor: University of Michigan. OCLC 831258847.
