= Clark Tibbitts =

American gerontologist (1903–1985)

- Born: 1903
- Died: October 11, 1985 (aged 81–82); Dover, New Hampshire, US

Academic work
- Era: 1929–1983
- Discipline: Gerontology
- Sub-discipline: Social gerontology
- Institutions: University of Michigan, Director of the Institute for Human Adjustment (1937-1949)

Clark Tibbitts (1903–1985) was a gerontologist who helped bring attention to the topic of aging and establish programs for aging populations in the United States. He held a variety of positions within gerontology and was an contributing author of many articles that examined aging. He has been described as "an architect of the field of gerontological education-an academic who spent most of his career in the federal government as an advocate for the development of aging education, training, and research programs in institutions of higher education."

== Biography ==
Tibbitts was born in 1903 and died at the age of 82 in October 1985. He graduated with a Bachelor of Science degree from the Lewis Institute in 1924 and did graduate work at the University of Chicago. He retired at age 83, after 35 years of government service. He worked as deputy director of the Office of Aging 1960–66, director of training for the Administration on Aging 1966–74, director of the National Clearinghouse on Aging 1974–76, special assistant to the Commissioner on Aging 1976–1982, both with roots from Tibbitts' original committee on aging.

== Career ==
Tibbitts worked at the University of Michigan's Institute for Human Adjustment, developing programs alongside Wilma T. Donahue. For several years they created courses, held conferences, and made radio programs for the public on the topic of aging. He worked there for 12 years before moving to Washington D.C. in 1949. He then served as specialist for aging, before any agencies were dedicated to the aging population. He was the author of many articles and texts on gerontology and aging. He was an advocate for government resources for the aging population, at a time when the average life expectancy in the United States was growing rapidly with assistance from advances in medicine and technology. He examined the social and psychological aspects of aging that had not been previously studied or explored because of the low life expectancy up until the mid-twentieth century.

== Accomplishments ==
Tibbitts was notable for his efforts to plan, organize, and convene multiple international conferences on aging for more than three decades, until the 1980s. His work encompasses more than 100 publications, including his Handbook of Social Gerontology: Societal Aspects of Aging, which, for a decade, was the major used textbook on aging.

== Awards ==
- 1957 – Honorary Sc. D. degree (a doctorate of science higher than a PhD), from the Institutum Divi Thomæ in Cincinnati, Ohio.
- 1981 – Academy for Gerontology in Higher Education (AGHE) Award for his outstanding contribution to the study of gerontology.
- 1986 – The Clark Tibbitts Award was established in 1986 for his contributions in the development of the Association for Gerontology in Higher Education, replacing the award he won in 1981.

== Selected publications ==
- Tibbitts, Clark (1950, October). The conference on aging.
- Tibbitts, Clark (1963). "Social gerontology: origin, scope and trends" (PDF). International Social Science Journal. XV (3): 339–354.
- Tibbitts, C. (1967, March 11). History in the making
- Tibbitts, Clark (1974). Handbook of social gerontology : societal aspects of aging (7th impr. ed.). Chicago: University of Chicago Press. OCLC 246225289.
- Tibbitts, Clark (February 1979). "Can we invalidate negative stereotypes of aging?". The Gerontologist. 19 (1): 10–20. doi:10.1093/geront/19.1.10. PMID 263568.
