= Debra Houry =

American physician

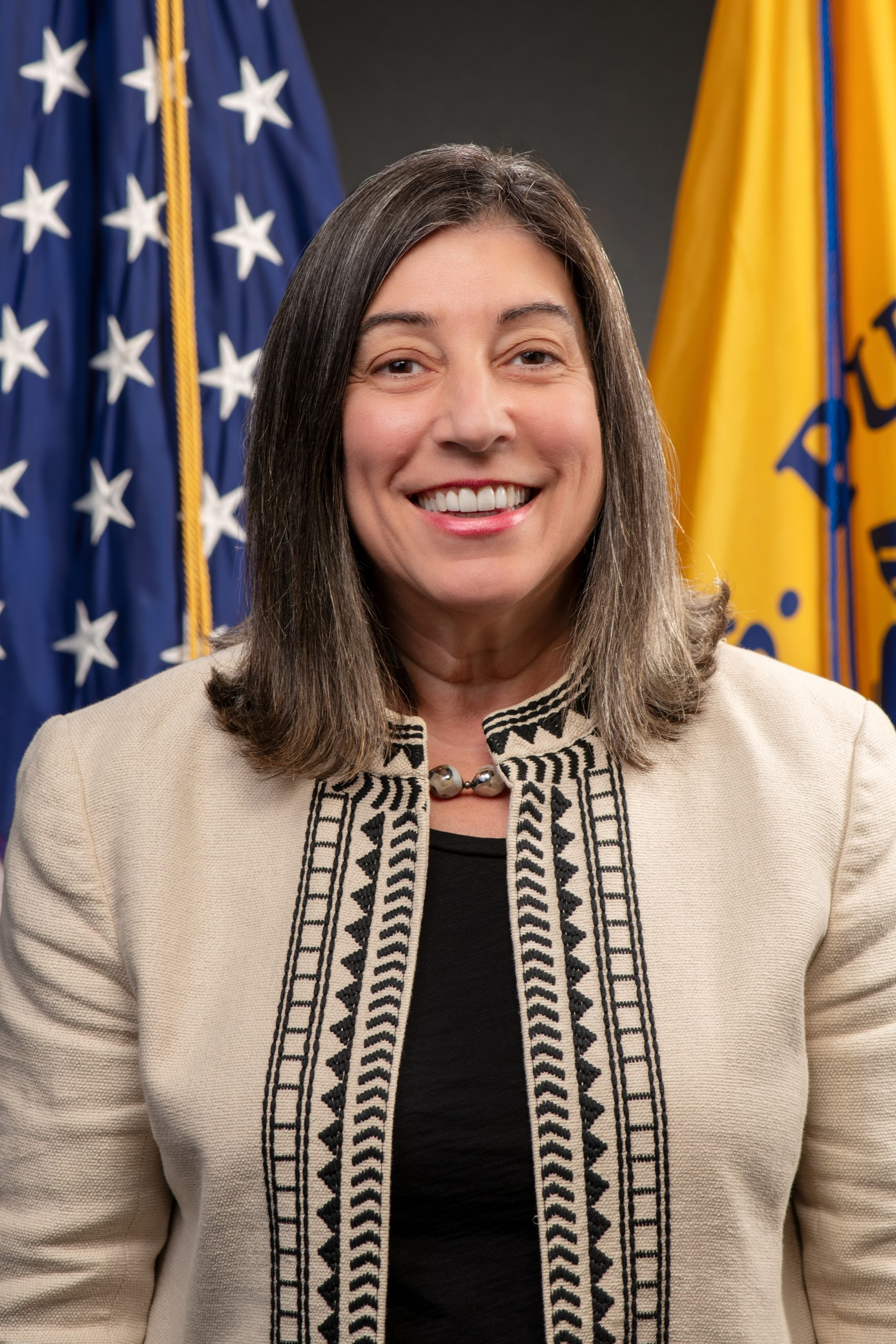

Personal details
- Born: Virginia, U.S.
- Education: Emory University (BA); Tulane University (MPH, MD)

Debra Elaine Houry is an American physician. She served as the Chief Medical Officer and Deputy Director for Program and Science of the Centers for Disease Control and Prevention until she resigned in protest at the firing of Susan Monarez.

She previously served as acting principal deputy director and former Director of the National Center for Injury Prevention and Control. She was also a tenured faculty at Emory University before moving to CDC.

== Early life and education ==
Houry was born and raised in Virginia. She completed her undergraduate degree at Emory University in 1994 with a double major in biology and philosophy. She also volunteered at Children's Healthcare of Atlanta at Egleston and worked as a house staff assistant at Grady Hospital. From Emory, Houry entered the dual medical degree and Master of Public Health program at Tulane University, graduating in 1998. Following this, she trained in emergency medicine at Denver Health Medical Center and received the Council of Emergency Medicine Residency Directors Resident Academic Achievement Award.

== Career ==
Following her residency, Houry became a faculty member in emergency medicine and in public health at Emory University, as well as associate director of Emory’s Center for Injury Control. While serving in this role, Houry was elected as the president of the Society for Academic Emergency Medicine. She went onto develop a 12-university consortium focused on public health research and practice and received a Centers for Disease Control and Prevention grant to become a federally funded research center. She achieved tenure and was also elected the Emory University Senate President. Of note, she also co-taught a Massive Open Online Course and had the opportunity to interview President Jimmy Carter in the class. Houry was part of the Public Voices Thought Leadership fellowship in 2013. Dr. Houry received many awards during her time at Emory including Emergency Medicine Residents Association National Mentorship Award, Academy of Women in Academic Emergency Medicine Researcher Award, and Emory University School of Medicine Dean’s Teaching Award. In 2013, Houry was selected as a Fellow in the Hedwig van Ameringen Executive Leadership in Academic Medicine program to prepare women for senior leadership roles in academic health institutions.

In 2014, she was appointed director of the National Center for Injury Prevention and Control (NCIPC) at the Centers for Disease Control and Prevention (CDC). During her tenure as the Director of the National Center for Injury Prevention and Control, Houry oversaw the release of "Guidelines for Prescribing Opioids for Chronic Pain," which gives providers research and academic evidence for managing patient opioid prescriptions. She also oversaw work in suicide prevention, traumatic brain injury, drowning, and childhood trauma. As a result of her research, Houry was elected a member of the National Academy of Medicine in 2019.

Houry testifies before the Senate Committee on Health, Education, Labor and Pensions along with former CDC director Susan Monarez; September 17, 2025.

In 2021, she was appointed acting principal deputy director of CDC during the COVID-19 pandemic, supporting Director Rochelle Walensky. In this role, Houry advised the director on agency issues and priorities. She was a key leader in the agency reorganization and the CDC Moving Forward efforts to reform the CDC after the COVID pandemic. In 2022, she was appointed as the Chief Medical Officer and Deputy Director for Program and Science at CDC. This was a new role created to increase the speed of delivery of scientific information and improve communications to the public. The Chief Medical Officer provides overall direction to, and coordination of, the scientific and medical programs of CDC. In addition, Houry served as the designated federal official for the Advisory Committee to the CDC Director. She has been recognized for her service to the nation with the American Medical Association Outstanding Government Service Award, the Metro Atlanta Chamber of Commerce Healthcare Hero Award, and the Creighton Wellman medal from Tulane.

In 2024, Mandy Cohen named Houry as the CDC transition lead to prepare the agency for the incoming administration. In August 2025, Houry was among several officials to resign following the second Trump administration's firing of Susan Monarez as CDC director. Houry told the Associated Press that the resigning officials "knew ... if [Monarez] leaves, we don’t have scientific leadership anymore". Atlantans came out to support Dr. Houry and her colleagues for their decision to leave the agency. Houry and Monarez testified to the Senate Health, Education, Labor, and Pensions committee about the Secretary and his handling of CDC in September 2025.
