= Carl T. Takamura =

American politician

Member of the Hawaii House of Representatives
- In office 1975–1978

Personal details
- Born: July 4, 1944 (age 82) Honolulu, Hawaii, U.S.
- Party: Democratic
- Spouse: Jeanette Takamura
- Education: University of Hawaiʻi, 1966, B.A., cum laude

Carl T. Takamura (born July 4, 1944) is an American politician. He served as a Democratic member of the Hawaii House of Representatives.

== Life and career ==
Takamura, a third generation Japanese American, was born in Honolulu, Hawaii. He graduated cum laude from the University of Hawaiʻi in 1966 with a Bachelor of Arts degree. He and his wife have a daughter. He is married to Jeanette Takamura, a professor who has held positions in the state government; federal governmental under President Clinton from 1997 to 2001; and as dean of the Columbia University School of Social Work from 2002 to 2016, the first woman to do so.

Takamura served in the Hawaii House of Representatives from 1975 to 1978. He was also a special assistant to Gov. George Ariyoshi who was in office from 1974 to 1986. He also served as chief of staff to then-U.S. Rep. Mazie Hirono who held that office from 2007 to 2013.

In the business world, Takamura served as an executive director of the Hawaii Business Roundtable and was a government affairs administrator for GTE Hawaiian Telephone Company.

In 2014, Takamura was appointed to AARPHawaii's Executive Council.

In 2022, Takamura was appointed to the state Charter Schools Commission, having previously been a senior associate for external affairs for Hawaiʻi P-20 Partnerships for Education, a statewide partnership to strengthen the education pipeline from early childhood through post-secondary education.
