= Older Americans Act of 1965 =

Federal initiative aiming to provide services to older adults

Older Americans Act
- Long title: An Act to provide assistance in the development of new or improved programs to help older persons through grants to the States for community planning and services and for training, through research, development, or training project grants, and to establish within the Department of Health, Education, and Welfare an operating agency to be designated as the "Administration on Aging".
- Acronyms (colloquial): OAA
- Nicknames: Older Americans Act of 1965
- Enacted by: the 89th United States Congress
- Effective: July 14, 1965

Citations
- Public law: Pub. L. 89–73
- Statutes at Large: 79 Stat. 218

Codification
- Titles amended: 42 U.S.C.: Public Health and Social Welfare
- U.S.C. sections created: 42 U.S.C. ch. 35 § 3001 et seq.

Legislative history
- Introduced in the House as H.R. 3708 by John E. Fogarty (D–RI) on March 9, 1965; Committee consideration by House Education and Labor, Senate Labor and Public Welfare; Passed the House on March 31, 1965 (396-1); Passed the Senate on May 27, 1965 (passed voice vote) with amendment; House agreed to Senate amendment on July 6, 1965 (passed voice vote); Signed into law by President Lyndon B. Johnson on July 14, 1965

Older Americans Act of 1965
Long title:	To provide assistance in the development of new or improved programs to help older persons through grants to the States for community planning and services and for training, through research, development, or training project grants, and to establish within the Department of Health, Education, and Welfare an operating agency to be designated as the "Administration on Aging".

The Older Americans Act of 1965 (Pub. L. 89–73, 79 Stat. 218) was the first federal level initiative aimed at providing comprehensive services for older adults in the United States. It created the National Aging Network comprising the Administration on Aging on the federal level, State Units on Aging at the state level, and Area Agencies on Aging at the local level. The network provides funding—based primarily on the percentage of an area's population 60 and older—for nutrition and supportive home and community-based services, disease prevention/health promotion services, elder rights programs, the National Family Caregiver Support Program, and the Native American Caregiver Support Program.

The Act was signed into law by President Lyndon B. Johnson on July 14, 1965.

In 2016, Congress reauthorized the Act in its entirety, effective through FY 2019. In March 2020, the Act was reauthorized through 2024.

== Overview ==
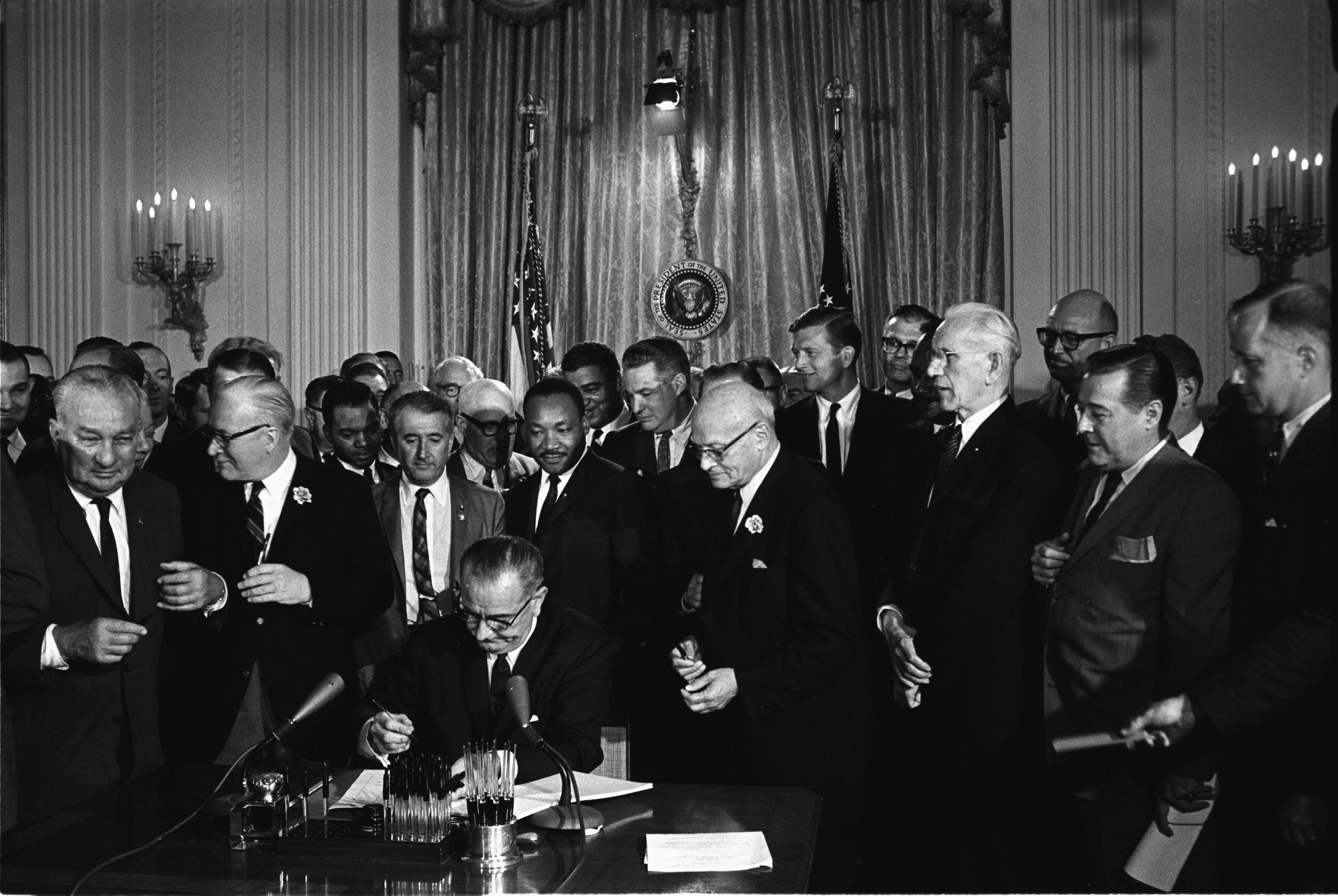
President Johnson signs the Civil Rights Act, another piece of Great Society legislation.

The OAA was passed as a part of Lyndon Johnson's Great Society reforms. It followed closely behind the Civil Rights Act and the Economic Opportunity Act which included many similarly structured programs, based around a centralized network of funding for a decentralized (community level) service delivery system. The OAA was a response to Congressional concerns about the lack of community social services for senior citizens.

Funding for many Great Society programs as well as Johnson’s political capital, dwindled during the Vietnam War. Some programs and agencies were dismantled by later administrations, such as Nixon’s and Ford’s slow dissolution of the Office of Economic Opportunity. Other programs, such as those under the OAA, Medicare, Medicaid, and initiatives in the arts and humanities continue to survive.

The stated purpose of the OAA is to ensure equal opportunity to the fair and free enjoyment of: adequate income in retirement; the best possible physical and mental health services without regard to economic status; suitable housing; restorative and long term care; opportunity for employment; retirement in health, honor, and dignity; civic, cultural, educational and recreational participation and contribution; efficient community services; immediate benefit from proven research knowledge; freedom, independence, and the exercise of self-determination; and protection against abuse neglect and exploitation.

== Legislative process ==
Representative John E. Fogarty (D-RI) introduced legislation on January 27, 1965, as H.R. 3708. The bill moved through the House and was referred to the House Committee on Education and Labor in March 1965. It passed the House on March 31 on a 395 to 1 roll call vote. The bill established an Administration on Aging (AoA) within the Department of Health, Education and Welfare (HEW).

In the Senate, H.R.3708 was introduced by Lister Hill (D-AL). On June 16, the Senate passed H.R. 3708 by a roll call vote of 72 to 5. On July 6, 1965, the House agreed to the Senate’s version of H.R. 3708.

== Structure ==
The act is divided into seven titles.

- Title I is a declaration of objectives.
- Title II establishes the Administration on Aging to carry out the provisions of the act.
- Title III provides federal funding for state agencies on aging and establishes the nutrition program. The nutrition program provides nutritional services, such as congregate and home-delivered meals, and is the largest expenditure of the OAA. This title also mandates the creation of corresponding state agencies before states may be eligible for this funding.
- Title IV creates a number of specific projects related to the objectives of the act. These include healthcare service in rural areas, computer training, civic engagement, and Native American programs.
- Title V establishes a program for engaging low-income senior citizens in community service employment and volunteer opportunities.
- Title VI establishes grants for certain Native American-focused programs on aging.
- Title VII creates state grants for "vulnerable elder rights protection" programs.

== Demographics ==
No one over age 60 can be denied services from OAA programs, except on the discretion of the state's State Unit on Aging which may impose more restrictive criteria. In FY 2008 these initiatives provided services to nearly 3 million people, and for FY 2011 the federal appropriation for all programs is $1.9 billion. A disproportionate number of seniors receiving services (27%) are below the poverty line (compared to 9.7% of the general population over age 60). Recipients of services under OAA are more likely to be female (71% vs. 57% of persons over 60). African Americans are over represented among OAA recipients and all other minorities are under represented. Recipients are also almost twice as likely to be rural, more likely to live alone, and on average have less income, less education, and are less healthy than those persons in the general population aged 60 and over.

== Programs created ==
- Administration on Aging (AoA) established under the Department of Health and Human Services as the federal level advocate for the aging population, and coordinator for service delivery to the elderly
- National Eldercare Locator Service a toll free hotline for identifying community resources
- Support Services to promote independence with regard to transportation, home care, legal aid, case management, and adult day care,
- Nutrition Programs including congregate and home delivered meals
- National Family Caregiver Support Program to provide respite services, education, training, and counseling to seniors providing kinship care, and to the caregivers of seniors
- Health Promotion providing educational services, counseling and consultation
- Aging and Disability Resource Centers to facilitate the dissemination of information on available resources
- The Older American Community Service Employment Act (OAA Title V) which works with the Department of Labor to provide employment opportunities for seniors
- Grants to Tribal Organizations
- The Long-term Care Ombudsman Program
- Elder Abuse, neglect, and exploitation public education services

== Older Americans Act Nutrition Program ==
The Administration on Aging (AoA) provides funding for nutrition services, including home-delivered meals and congregate meals, to older adults throughout the United States as authorized by Title III-C of the Older Americans Act (OAA). The Older Americans Act Nutrition Program, also known as the Senior Nutrition Program, aims to reduce hunger, food insecurity, and malnutrition; promote health and well-being; and promote socialization among older adult aged 60 and older who are in social and economic need. All meals served using OAA funds must meet the following nutrition quality standards:

- Follow the Dietary Guidelines for Americans
- Provide at least one-third of the Dietary Reference Intakes
- Adhere to state and local food safety guidelines
- Appeal to older adults

According to the 2021 National Survey of OAA Participants, 51% of participants live alone, 57% of participants are 75 years or older, and over 50% of participants report that one home-delivered or congregate meal provides 50% or more of their total daily food intake. In March 2022, AoA celebrated the Senior Nutrition Program's 50th anniversary. AoA also funds the National Resource Center on Nutrition and Aging, which supports OAA senior nutrition programs and stakeholders in providing high-quality services, addressing current and emerging issues, and identifying opportunities to enhance the program.

== Amendments to 1965 Act ==
Chronological amendments and revisions to the Older Americans Act of 1965.

Date of Enactment	Public Law Number	U.S. Statute Citation	U.S. Legislative Bill	U.S. Presidential Administration
July 1, 1967	Pub. L. 90–42	81 Stat. 106	H.R. 10730	Lyndon B. Johnson
September 17, 1969	Pub. L. 91–69	83 Stat. 108	H.R. 11235	Richard M. Nixon
March 22, 1972	Pub. L. 92–258	86 Stat. 88	S. 1163	Richard M. Nixon
November 28, 1975	Pub. L. 94–135	89 Stat. 713	H.R. 3922	Gerald R. Ford
October 18, 1978	Pub. L. 95–478	92 Stat. 1513	H.R. 12255	Jimmy E. Carter
April 1, 1986	Pub. L. 99–269	100 Stat. 78	H.R. 2453	Ronald W. Reagan
November 29, 1987	Pub. L. 100–175	101 Stat. 926	H.R. 1451	Ronald W. Reagan
September 30, 1992	Pub. L. 102–375	106 Stat. 1195	H.R. 2967	George H.W. Bush
November 13, 2000	Pub. L. 106–501 (text) (PDF)	114 Stat. 2226	H.R. 782	William J. Clinton
October 17, 2006	Pub. L. 109–365 (text) (PDF)	120 Stat. 2522	H.R. 6197	George W. Bush
April 23, 2007	Pub. L. 110–19 (text) (PDF)	121 Stat. 84	S. 1002	George W. Bush

== See also ==
- Administration on Aging
- Age Discrimination in Employment Act of 1967
- Gerontology
- Great Society
- Social Security (United States)
- United States Senate Special Committee on Aging
