= National Center for Emerging and Zoonotic Infectious Diseases =

Specialized sub-centre of US CDC

Agency overview
- Formed: 2010
- Preceding agencies: National Center for Zoonotic, Vectorborne, and Enteric Diseases; National Center for Preparedness, Detection, and Control of Infectious Diseases
- Jurisdiction: Federal Government of the United States
- Headquarters: Atlanta, Georgia
- Agency executive: Position vacant
- Parent department: The Centers for Disease Control and Prevention
- Website: https://www.cdc.gov/ncezid/index.html

The National Center for Emerging and Zoonotic Infectious Diseases (NCEZID) is a national center at the Centers for Disease Control and Prevention (CDC) for the prevention, early detection, and control of infectious disease threats. NCEZID works collaboratively across CDC and with external partners by means of the One Health approach. NCEZID works to protect people from emerging infections, food borne infections, and zoonotic infections (diseases that can jump by means of cross-species transmission from animal to human.

The center was established in its present form in 2010. However, its scientific activities and goals trace back to the earlier history of the CDC. NZEZID was created by the incorporation of parts of its preceding organizations, the National Center for Zoonotic, Vectorborne, and Enteric Diseases and the National Center for Preparedness, Detection, and Control of Infectious Diseases.

It is one of three CDC centers focusing on infectious disease, along with the National Center for Immunization and Respiratory Diseases and the National Center for HIV/AIDS, Viral Hepatitis, STD, and TB Prevention.

== Functions ==
NCEZID detects and monitors infectious disease by means of the following examples of its efforts:

- Wastewater surveillance (monitoring wastewater for infectious disease) in the United States
- Working on remedies to the threats of antimicrobial resistance, germs resistant to antimicrobial medications and support global AMR efforts by working with Global Antimicrobial Resistance Laboratory and Response Network, the Global Action in Healthcare Network, and PulseNet International.
- Implementing traveler-based genomic surveillance at strategic ports for the early warning as well as mitigation of infectious diseases.

== Organization ==
NCEZID contains the following divisions:

- Division of Global Migration Health
- Division for Foodborne, Waterborne, and Environmental Diseases
- Division of Infectious Disease Readiness and Innovation
- Division of Parasitic Diseases and Malaria
- Division of Vector-borne Diseases, which works to identify and respond to vector-borne diseases that are a risk to human health both domestically and globally.
- Division of Healthcare Quality Promotion, which works by means of safe healthcare delivery systems in the United States and internationally to protect patients and healthcare workers.
- Division of High-Consequence Pathogens and Pathology, which protects the public from deadly diseases.

While most NCEZID divisions are based in Atlanta along with the rest of CDC, two divisions are based elsewhere. The Division of Vector-Borne Diseases is based in Fort Collins, Colorado, with a branch in San Juan, Puerto Rico. The Arctic Investigations Program is based in Anchorage, Alaska. In addition, the Division of Global Migration Health operates quarantine facilities in 20 cities in the U.S.

NCEZID participates in the following CDC-wide programs:

- Advanced Molecular Detection, which uses genomic sequencing technology for applications such as tracking foodborne outbreaks to their source.
- Global Health, which is an office that across the various departments and centers of the CDC, addressing emerging and zoonotic infectious diseases using the CDC Global Health Strategic Framework.
- One Health, which works on One Health activities nationally and internationals, and addresses among other issues zoonotic and emerging infectious diseases as well as pandemic preparedness and response.

== History ==
NCEZID is an indirect successor to the Center for Infectious Diseases, one of the original centers established in 1980. In 2007, as part of the Futures Initiative, the Center for Infectious Diseases was split into the National Center for Zoonotic, Vectorborne, and Enteric Diseases and the National Center for Preparedness, Detection, and Control of Infectious Diseases. In 2009, these two centers were realigned, with their programs moved into the new NCEZID or the Center for Global Health, as well as other parts of CDC.
