= National Center for HIV/AIDS, Viral Hepatitis, STD, and TB Prevention =

The National Center for HIV/AIDS, Viral Hepatitis, STD, and TB Prevention is a part of the Centers for Disease Control and Prevention and is responsible for public health surveillance, prevention research, and programs to prevent and control human immunodeficiency virus (HIV) infection and acquired immunodeficiency syndrome (AIDS), other sexually transmitted diseases (STDs), viral hepatitis, and tuberculosis (TB). Center staff work in collaboration with governmental and nongovernmental partners at community, State, national, and international levels, applying well-integrated multidisciplinary programs of research, surveillance, technical assistance, and evaluation.

It is one of three CDC centers focusing on infectious disease, along with the National Center for Immunization and Respiratory Diseases and the National Center for Emerging and Zoonotic Infectious Diseases.

== History ==
Some of NCHSTP's programs have a long history within the U.S. Public Health Service (PHS). The PHS Division of Venereal Diseases was created in 1918, and the Division of Tuberculosis in 1944. These would both be consolidated into the Division of Special Health Services in 1954. The venereal disease programs were transferred to CDC in 1957, and the tuberculosis programs in 1960.

The Center for Prevention Services was formed in 1980 as one of the original five CDC centers, at the same time CDC's name changed from the singular "Center for Disease Control" to plural "Centers for Disease Control". It was renamed the National Center for HIV, STD, and TB Prevention in 1996.

In November 2005, Kevin Fenton was named director of the center. In March 2007, the center was renamed to its current name to reflect the addition of CDC's viral hepatitis program.

In December 2020, Demetre Daskalakis was named director of the Division of HIV/AIDS Prevention.
