= National Center for Immunization and Respiratory Diseases =

Research institute

Agency overview
- Formed: 1993; 33 years ago
- Preceding agency: National Immunization Program (1993–2006)
- Jurisdiction: Federal government of the United States
- Headquarters: Atlanta, Georgia, US
- Agency executive: Vacant, (director)
- Parent agency: Centers for Disease Control and Prevention
- Website: www.cdc.gov/ncird/

The National Center for Immunization and Respiratory Diseases (NCIRD), formerly known as the National Immunization Program until April 2006, is charged with responsibility for the planning, coordination, and conduct of immunization activities in the United States. NCIRD is a part of the Centers for Disease Control and Prevention, located in Atlanta, Georgia, and housed in the CDC's Coordinating Center for Infectious Diseases (CCID). The National Center for Immunization provides consultation, training, statistical, promotional, educational, epidemiological, and technical services to assist state and local health departments across the US in planning, developing, contracting and implementing immunization programs.

It is one of three CDC centers focusing on infectious disease, along with the National Center for Emerging and Zoonotic Infectious Diseases and the National Center for HIV/AIDS, Viral Hepatitis, STD, and TB Prevention.

== Mandate ==
NCIRD supports and supervises state and local agencies working on immunization activities and commercial contracting for vaccine supply and distribution. NCIRD supports a national framework for surveillance of diseases for which immunizing agents are increasingly becoming available from commercial pharmaceutical companies, and assists health departments in developing vaccine information management systems to facilitate identification of children whose parents may have not complied with local vaccination laws. NCIRD helps parents and healthcare providers ensure compliance with vaccination laws so that all children without health or religious exemptions can be immunized at specific ages in full compliance with local laws. NCIRD also administers research and operational programs for the prevention and control of vaccine-preventable diseases, assesses vaccination levels in state and local areas, and monitors the safety and efficacy of vaccines by linking vaccine administration information with disease outbreak patterns and adverse event mandated reporting requirements.

NCIRD's proposed mission is to prevent disease, disability, and death through immunization and control of respiratory and related diseases. The new center will support both domestic and global immunization and respiratory disease prevention and control priorities, and will link epidemiology and laboratory science around vaccine-preventable diseases and acute respiratory infections with prevention and control programs and strong communication science. NCIRD will also work within CDC to synthesize vaccine-related information from other parts of CDC with immunization expertise.

== History ==
The National Immunization Program was initiated in 1976.

In May 1993, Secretary of Health and Human Services Donna Shalala announced that the Division of Immunization would be moved from the Center for Prevention Services to the Office of the CDC Director and renamed the National Immunization Program. The director of the Division of Immunization, Dr. Walter Orenstein, was the first director of the National Immunization Program.

In April 2006, the National Immunization Program became the National Center for Immunization and Respiratory Diseases (NCIRD). At the time, NCIRD was led by Anne Schuchat, MD, who earlier had been the director of the NIP since December 2005. The changes reorganized the NIP into five divisions and expand its activities. High visibility NIP activities have been retained, including its support for the Advisory Committee on Immunization Practices (ACIP) and Vaccines for Children Program.

NCIRD director Schuchat indicated a willingness to expand immunization surveillance and enforce vaccination schedule compliance, "I think we have a long way to go with adolescent immunization programs, as well as adult programs... There are so many opportunities for health impact in this group, and the new vaccines really offer us this whole new chance to revitalize health care for adolescents and prevention as an adolescent health issue." Incorporating new vaccines into routine practice became a big priority for the NCIRD under Schuchat’s leadership.

== NCIRD divisions ==
NCIRD has five divisions:

- Division of Bacterial Diseases (DBD)
- Division of Viral Diseases (DVD)
- Coronavirus and Other Respiratory Viruses Division (CORVD)
- Immunization Services Division (ISD)
- Influenza Division (ID)

== See also ==
- Vaccine Safety Datalink
