= Administration on Aging =

US government agency

Agency overview
- Jurisdiction: Federal government of the United States
- Headquarters: Mary E. Switzer Memorial Building Washington, DC
- Agency executives: Mary Lazare, Acting Assistant Secretary for Aging; Kari Benson, Deputy Assistant Secretary for Aging
- Parent department: United States Department of Health and Human Services
- Parent Agency: Administration for Community Living
- Key document: Older Americans Act
- Website: acl.gov/about-acl/administration-aging

The Administration on Aging (AoA) is an agency within the Administration for Community Living of the U.S. Department of Health and Human Services.

== Functions ==
AoA works to ensure that older Americans can stay independent in their communities, mostly by awarding grants to States, Native American tribal organizations, and local communities to support programs authorized by Congress in the Older Americans Act of 1965. AoA also awards discretionary grants to research organizations working on projects that support those goals. It conducts statistical activities in support of the research, analysis, and evaluation of programs to meet the needs of an aging population.

AoA's FY 2013 budget proposal includes a total of $1.9 billion, $819 million of which funds senior nutrition programs like Meals on Wheels. The agency also funds $539 million in grants to programs to help seniors stay in their homes through services (such as accomplishing essential activities of daily living, like getting to the doctor's office, buying groceries etc.) and through help given to caregivers. Some of these grants are for Cash & Counseling programs that provide Medicaid participants a monthly budget for home care and access to services that help them manage their finances.

== Leadership ==
AoA is headed by the Assistant Secretary for Aging. From July 2016 to August 2017, Edwin Walker served as Acting Assistant Secretary for Aging. The Assistant Secretary reports directly to the Secretary of Health and Human Services. Lance Allen Robertson was confirmed in August 2017, and served until January 20, 2021. On January 20, 2021, Alison Barkoff was sworn in as Principal Deputy Assistant Secretary, and was named as Acting Assistant Secretary. On March 9, 2022, President Biden Nominated Rita Landgraf, the former Secretary of the Delaware Department of Health and Social Services, to serve as his first Assistant Secretary.

== History ==
AoA was established by the Older Americans Act of 1965. It became part of the Administration for Community Living in 2012.

== See also ==
- Category:United States assistant secretaries for aging
- Pension Rights Center
- Elder law
- United States Senate Special Committee on Aging
- Clark Tibbitts
