= Lisa Richardson =

Lisa Richardson may refer to:

- Lisa Richardson (curler)
- Lisa Richardson (journalist)
- Lisa C. Richardson, American physician

== See also ==
- Liza Richardson, music supervisor
