= Mark L. Rosenberg =

American public health researcher

Mark L. Rosenberg (born 1945) is an American physician and public health researcher. He joined the Task Force for Global Health in 1999, retiring as president and CEO in 2016. Rosenberg also served as Assistant Surgeon General and as Rear Admiral in the United States Public Health Service from 1995 to 2000. He has served on the faculty at Morehouse School of Medicine, Emory University School of Medicine, and the Rollins School of Public Health at Emory University. He previously worked at the Centers for Disease Control and Prevention (CDC) for approximately 20 years, dealing with eradication of smallpox, HIV/AIDS and enteric diseases. He also helped oversee research on gun violence through the National Center for Injury Prevention and Control (NCIPC).

== Education ==
Rosenberg received his undergraduate degree, as well as degrees in public policy and medicine, at Harvard University. He completed a residency in internal medicine and a fellowship in infectious diseases at Massachusetts General Hospital, a residency in psychiatry at the Boston Beth Israel Hospital, and a residency in preventive medicine at CDC.

== Career ==
Rosenberg worked at the CDC for 20 years, where he was instrumental in founding the National Center for Injury Prevention and Control (NCIPC). He also served as the first permanent director of the NCIPC beginning in 1994. While there, he was responsible for overseeing gun violence research at the CDC. His research included studying increases in the incidence of suicide. He publicly advocated for measures to control gun violence, emphasizing its public health impact at a 1993 conference: "When you bring a gun into your home, you take on to yourself, your family and your kids a big health risk." The National Rifle Association of America (NRA) responded to Rosenberg and others by claiming that the CDC was biased against guns, and lobbied to eliminate the NCIPC.

NRA proponents have argued that the issue of gun violence should be treated solely as a law enforcement matter, not as a public health issue. In a complex arena of debate involving assessment of risk and regulation, Rosenberg is frequently referenced for comments in a New York Times article in 1994, in which he was quoted as saying “We need to revolutionize the way we look at guns, like we did with cigarettes. It used to be that smoking was a glamour symbol, cool, sexy, macho. Now it is dirty, deadly and banned.”

Enactment of the 1996 Dickey Amendment, the Congressional restriction which prevented the CDC from using its funding "to advocate or promote gun control," largely shut down research into gun violence in the United States. CDC funding of gun violence research declined by 96 percent while academic publications addressing gun violence declined 64 percent between 1998 and 2012. It also resulted in the ending of Rosenberg's position; he left the CDC in 1999 and joined the Task Force for Global Health, of which he became president and CEO. He retired and became president emeritus of the Task Force for Global Health in 2016.

Rosenberg continued to be highly critical of the Dickey Amendment, saying in 2012 that the National Rifle Association of America (which lobbied Congress to enact this restriction) has "terrorized" the scientific community. He has also said this restriction has impaired researchers' ability to understand the problem of gun violence, saying in 2015 that “Because we don’t know what works, we as a country are left in a shouting match.”

He also came to know and like Representative Jay Dickey, who had sponsored the 1996 Dickey Amendment. In talking to each other, the two found common ground. Dickey regretted his role in blocking the CDC from researching gun violence, and Rosenberg saw preventing gun violence and protecting gun rights as compatible rather than exclusionary goals. Dickey and Rosenberg worked together to try to restore federal funding for research and to promote gun safety as a means towards public health.

Our nation does not have to choose between reducing gun-violence injuries and safeguarding gun ownership. Indeed, scientific research helped reduce the motor vehicle death rate in the United States and save hundreds of thousands of lives—all without getting rid of cars. For example, research led to the development of simple four-foot barricades dividing oncoming traffic that are preventing injuries and saving many lives. We can do the same with respect to firearm-related deaths, reducing their numbers while preserving the rights of gun owners. Dickey & Rosenberg, 2015

In 2017, Rosenberg was invited to gave the eulogy at Jay Dickey's funeral. In 2019, Rosenberg and Betty Dickey were part of a coalition that succeeded in persuading Congress to fund gun violence research. $25 million was split between the CDC and NIH for data collection sharing and analysis on gun violence.

== Books ==
Rosenberg is the author of Howard Hiatt: How This Extraordinary Mentor Transformed Health with Science and Compassion (2018)., a co-author of Real Collaboration: What Global Health Needs to Succeed (2010) and a co-editor of Violence in America: A Public Health Approach (1991). Rosenberg has also documented his work through his photography. In 1980, he published Patients: the Experience of Illness, combining photographs and interviews to illuminate the lives of six people who were ill. Rosenberg's photographs and other papers are part of the collections of the Center for the History of Medicine at the Francis A. Countway Library of Medicine in Boston, Massachusetts.

== Honors and awards ==
In 1995, Rosenberg was elected a member of the Institute of Medicine. He has also received the Public Health Service Outstanding Service Medal, Public Health Service Meritorious Service Medal, Public Health Service Distinguished Service Medal, and Surgeon General's Exemplary Service Medal.

== Archives ==
- "Mark L. Rosenberg papers, 1966-2017 (inclusive)". Center for the History of Medicine (Francis A. Countway Library of Medicine).
- Sutherland, Bryan (January 17, 2019). "Staff Finds: The Photography of Mark Rosenberg". Center for the History of Medicine (Francis A. Countway Library of Medicine).
