= Dickey Amendment =

1996 Amendment that forbids the CDC from studying gun violence

The Dickey Amendment is a provision first inserted as a rider into the 1997 omnibus spending bill of the United States federal government that mandated that "none of the funds made available for injury prevention and control at the Centers for Disease Control and Prevention (CDC) may be used to advocate or promote gun control." In the same spending bill, Congress earmarked $2.6 million from the CDC's budget, the exact amount that had previously been allocated to the agency for firearms research the previous year, for traumatic brain injury-related research.

The amendment was lobbied for by the National Rifle Association of America (NRA), and named after its author Jay Dickey, a Republican member of the United States House of Representatives from Arkansas. Although the Dickey Amendment did not explicitly ban it, for about two decades the CDC avoided all research on gun violence for fear it would be financially penalized. Congress clarified the law in 2018 to allow for such research, and the FY2020 federal omnibus spending bill earmarked the first funding for it since 1996.

== Adoption and effect ==
In 1993, the New England Journal of Medicine published a study by Arthur Kellermann and others found that guns in the home were associated with an increased risk of homicide in the home. The research was funded by the CDC's National Center for Injury Prevention and Control (NCIPC). The NRA responded by lobbying for the elimination of the NCIPC. The NCIPC was not abolished, but the Dickey Amendment was included in the 1996 Omnibus Consolidated Appropriations Bill for Fiscal Year 1997.

In a December 2012 article published in the Journal of the American Medical Association, Kellermann wrote: "Precisely what was or was not permitted under the clause was unclear. But no federal employee was willing to risk his or her career or the agency's funding to find out. Extramural support for firearm injury prevention research quickly dried up."

Equivalent "Dickey Amendment" language was added by Congress to the Consolidated Appropriations Act, 2012 funding the National Institutes of Health (NIH). This language was also lobbied for by the NRA.

== Calls for repeal ==
In response to this amendment being adopted, the American Psychological Association adopted a resolution condemning it. In December 2015, multiple medical organizations, including Doctors for America, the American College of Preventive Medicine, and the American Academy of Pediatrics, called on Congress to repeal the amendment. That same month, the American Association for the Advancement of Science also called for an end to this amendment. Other groups calling for repeal of the Dickey Amendment include the American Association of Colleges of Pharmacy, American College of Physicians, American College of Surgeons, American Medical Student Association, American Public Health Association, and Giffords Law Center to Prevent Gun Violence.

Mark L. Rosenberg, the former director of the National Center for Injury Prevention and Control, has described this amendment as "a shot fired across the bow" at CDC researchers who wanted to research gun violence. Enactment of the 1996 Dickey Amendment, which prevented the CDC from using its funding "to advocate or promote gun control," largely shut down research into gun violence in the United States. CDC funding of gun violence research declined by 96 percent while academic publications addressing gun violence declined 64 percent between 1998 and 2012.

In a 2012 op-ed, Dickey and Rosenberg argued that the CDC should be able to research gun violence. Dickey has said that he regrets his role in stopping the CDC from researching gun violence, saying he simply didn't want to "let any of those dollars go to gun control advocacy."

Following the Sandy Hook Elementary School shooting in 2012, President Barack Obama directed the CDC and other federal agencies to "conduct or sponsor research into the causes of gun violence and the ways to prevent it." The CDC responded by funding a research project and conducting their own study in 2015. That month, a spokeswoman for the agency, Courtney Lenard, told The Washington Post that "it is possible for us to conduct firearm-related research within the context of our efforts to address youth violence, domestic violence, sexual violence, and suicide. But our resources are very limited."

In October 2015, 110 members of Congress, all of whom were Democrats, signed a letter calling on Congress to reject the amendment. Despite the efforts of House Democratic Leader Nancy Pelosi to have the Dickey amendment removed from the spending bill for the following year, Congress passed this bill with the amendment still in it.

== Subsequent history ==
On March 21, 2018, Congressional negotiators reached a deal on an Omnibus continuing resolution. The $1.3 trillion spending agreement also includes language that codified Health and Human Services Secretary Alex Azar's interpretation of the Dickey Rider in testimony on February 18, 2018, before the US House Energy and Commerce Subcommittee. While the amendment itself remains, the language in a report accompanying the Omnibus spending bill clarifies that the Centers for Disease Control and Prevention can indeed conduct research into gun violence, but cannot use government appropriated funds to specifically advocate for gun control. The bill included no funding earmarked for gun safety and was signed into law by U.S. President Donald J. Trump on March 23, 2018.

The fiscal year 2020 federal budget included $25 million for the CDC and NIH to research reducing gun-related deaths and injuries, the first such funding since 1996.

== See also ==
- Gun law in the United States
- Gun politics in the United States
- Gun violence in the United States
- Tiahrt Amendment
