= Layden =

Layden may refer to:

- Elmer Layden (1903–1973), Commissioner of the National Football League and head football coach at University of Notre Dame
- Frank Layden (1932–2025), American basketball head coach and executive for the Utah Jazz
- Gene Layden (1894–1984), Major League Baseball outfielder
- Jennifer Layden, American physician and epidemiologist
- Penny Layden (born 1969), British actress
- Pete Layden (1919–1982), Major League Baseball outfielder
- Scott Layden, assistant general manager with the San Antonio Spurs

== Given name ==
- Layden Robinson (born 2001), American football player
