= Shuford =

Shuford is a surname. Notable people with the surname include:

- Alonzo C. Shuford (1858–1933), American politician
- George A. Shuford (1895–1962), American politician
- Jacob L. Shuford, American admiral
- Jennifer Shuford, American infectious diseases physician
- Reggie Shuford, American lawyer

== See also ==
- Shuford Stadium, a stadium in North Carolina in the United States
