= The Task Force for Global Health =

International non-profit focused on neglected tropical diseases (1984-present)

The Task Force for Global Health is an international, nonprofit organization that works to improve health of people most in need, primarily in developing countries. Founded in 1984 by global health pioneer Dr. William Foege, The Task Force consists of eight programs focused on neglected tropical diseases, vaccines, field epidemiology, public health informatics, and health workforce development. Those programs include the African Health Workforce Project, the Center for Vaccine Equity, Children Without Worms, International Trachoma Initiative, Mectizan Donation Program, Neglected Tropical Diseases Support Center, Public Health Informatics Institute, and TEPHINET. The Task Force works in partnership with ministries of health and hundreds of organizations, including major pharmaceutical companies that donate billions of dollars annually in essential medicines. Major funders include the Bill & Melinda Gates Foundation, CDC, WHO, Robert Wood Johnson Foundation, de Beaumont Foundation, United States Agency for International Development, Sightsavers, Pfizer, Merck & Co., Johnson & Johnson, and GlaxoSmithKline. The Task Force is affiliated with Emory University, headquartered in Decatur, Georgia, a town in metro Atlanta, and has regional offices in Guatemala and Ethiopia. The Task Force currently supports work in 154 countries.

== Recipient of the 2016 Conrad N. Hilton Humanitarian Prize ==
The Task Force for Global Health received the 2016 Conrad N. Hilton Humanitarian Prize during a symposium titled "The Future of Humanitarian Action" held at the Waldorf Astoria in New York City. The Task Force was selected by a panel of independent international jurors for having made "contributions to improving the health of people living in extreme poverty.".

== History ==
The organization was co-founded by global health pioneer and former CDC Director, Dr. William Foege and two of his former CDC colleagues, Carol Walters and Bill Watson. It was founded in 1984 as The Task Force for Child Survival. The Task Force was initially launched to foster collaboration among leading health and development agencies. Under the leadership of Dr. Foege, The Task Force brought together World Bank Group, The Rockefeller Foundation, The United Nations Development Programme, WHO, and UNICEF, WHO to raise childhood immunization rates. In 1984, only 20 percent of children worldwide were receiving immunizations and 12,000 children, mostly in the world's poorest countries, were dying every day. By 1990, The Task Force had raised childhood immunization rates to 80 percent globally. Since then, The Task Force has used its strength and credibility in collaboration to positively affect a broad range of health issues affecting the world's poor. In 2015, The Task Force celebrated 30 years of contributions to global health at an event that included World Bank Group President Jim Yong Kim.

== Work ==
The Task Force works with hundreds of partners to control and eliminate neglected tropical diseases and increase access to medicines and vaccines for multi-drug-resistant tuberculosis, poliomyelitis, influenza, and cholera. Beginning with the Mectizan Donation Program, The Task Force is credited with working with the pharmaceutical industry to donate billions of dollars annually in essential medicines for the control and elimination of neglected tropical diseases.

Collaboration, health equity, and social justice are the cornerstones of all Task Force programs. The organization is a major partner in the global effort to eliminate three neglected tropical diseases by 2025—blinding trachoma, river blindness, and lymphatic filariasis—which collectively threaten hundreds of millions of people each year with blindness, disfigurement, and death.

Information and laboratory technologies are vital tools in The Task Force's work to control and eliminate diseases and increase access to quality health care for people in developing countries. Using a smartphone-based data collection system, The Task Force maps the prevalence of neglected tropical diseases (NTDs) to determine where interventions should be implemented. It uses portable molecular technology and tablet-based systems to detect and diagnose NTDs within populations. It also uses diverse technologies to help developing countries manage their healthcare workforce in order to meet the health needs of their populations.

In 2015, The Task Force's Public Health Informatics Institute was named a partner on a new Bill & Melinda Gates Foundation-funded initiative called the Child Health and Mortality Prevention Surveillance Program (CHAMPS) that aims to understand and ultimately address the causes of death for children under 5 in developing countries.

In 2016, the Task Force helped launch a program called Digital Bridge which is developing an electronic case reporting system to improve information exchange between the public health and healthcare sectors.

== Growth and future ==
In 2016, The Task Force reached an agreement to purchase a DeKalb County government building in downtown Decatur for a larger headquarters. The Task Force has begun examining how it might help address the growing epidemic of non-communicable diseases (NCDs) in developing countries.
