= Mark D. Hollis =

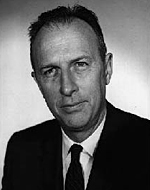

Director of the Centers for Disease Control and Prevention
- In office 1944–1946
- President: Franklin D. Roosevelt; Harry S. Truman
- Preceded by: Louis L. Williams
- Succeeded by: Raymond A. Vonderlehr

Personal details
- Born: Mark Dexter Hollis; September 24, 1908; Buena Vista, Georgia
- Died: February 21, 1998 (aged 89); Lakeland, Florida

Mark Dexter Hollis (September 24, 1908 – February 21, 1998) was the director of the Centers for Disease Control and Prevention from 1944 to 1946.
