= Raymond A. Vonderlehr =

American physician and director of the CDC (1897–1973)

Director of the Centers for Disease Control and Prevention
- In office 1947–1951
- President: Harry S. Truman
- Preceded by: Mark D. Hollis
- Succeeded by: Justin M. Andrews

Personal details
- Born: April 25, 1897 Richmond, Virginia, US
- Died: January 28, 1973 (aged 75) DeKalb County, Georgia, US
- Education: Hampden–Sydney College (BA); University of Virginia (MD)

Raymond Aloysius Vonderlehr (April 25, 1897 – January 28, 1973) was the director of the Centers for Disease Control and Prevention from 1947 to 1951. He was also the onsite director on the Tuskegee Experiment from its start until 1943. During his time as director, he deceitfully insinuated that diagnostic and painful lumbar punctures were necessary treatment. He also directed plans to continue the experiment until each subject could be "brought to autopsy" by giving the subjects non-effective treatments such as aspirin so that they would continue to believe the purpose of the study was to find a cure for syphilis. He was also a mentor to John R. Heller Jr. who would take over his duties at the Tuskegee Experiment after he left.
