= Louis L. Williams =

Physician and US federal employee

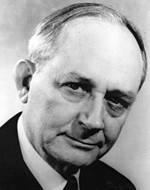

Director of the Malaria Control in War Areas
- In office 1942–1943
- President: Franklin D. Roosevelt
- Succeeded by: Mark D. Hollis

Personal details
- Born: Louis Laval Williams, Jr. February 21, 1889; Hampton, Virginia
- Died: May 6, 1967 (aged 78); Bethesda, Maryland

Louis L. Williams Jr. (February 21, 1889 – May 6, 1967), was an American physician. He served with the United States Public Health Service (USPHS) from 1915 to 1953. From 1942 to 1943, he served as the director of the Malaria Control in War Areas, a program which would be succeeded by the Centers for Disease Control and Prevention. For the majority of his professional life, Dr. Williams worked to eliminate malaria around the world. He retired from the U.S. Public Health Service in 1953 with the rank of Medical Director. The last five years of his career, he served as Chief of the Division of International Health. He was a delegate to numerous international health conferences, most notably the 1946 New York conference at which the World Health Organization was established.
