= Antibiotic Resistance Lab Network =

US CDC laboratory group

The Antibiotic Resistance Lab Network (ARLN) is a group of laboratories of the United States Centers for Disease Control and Prevention established to supplement the work of local and state public health laboratories in the identification and research of antibiotic resistance. It was created as part of the CDC's National Action Plan for Combating Antibiotic Resistant Bacteria.

In the United States, antibiotic resistance causes illness in 2 million people and 23,000 deaths.

One of the purposes of the ARLN is the identification of resistance mechanisms. Clinical samples are not routinely tested because it is not needed for patient-level decisions and insurance companies will not reimburse providers.
