= Centers for Disease Control and Prevention =

United States government public health agency

Agency overview
- Formed: July 1, 1946; 80 years ago
- Preceding agencies: Office of National Defense Malaria Control Activities (1942); Office of Malaria Control in War Areas (1942–46); Communicable Disease Center (1946–67); National Communicable Disease Center (1967–70); Center for Disease Control (1970–80); Centers for Disease Control (1980–92)
- Jurisdiction: Federal government of the United States
- Headquarters: Atlanta, Georgia, U.S.; 33°47′58″N 84°19′42″W
- Employees: 11,815
- Annual budget: US$11.581 billion (FY24)
- Agency executives: Erica Schwartz, Director; Jennifer Shuford and Sean Slovenski, Deputy Director
- Parent agency: United States Department of Health and Human Services
- Website: www.cdc.gov

The Centers for Disease Control and Prevention (CDC) is the national public health agency of the United States. It is a United States federal agency under the Department of Health and Human Services (HHS), and is headquartered in Atlanta, Georgia.

The agency's main goal is the protection of public health and safety through the control and prevention of disease, injury, and disability in the US and worldwide. The CDC focuses national attention on developing and applying disease control and prevention. It especially focuses its attention on infectious disease, food borne pathogens, environmental health, occupational safety and health, health promotion, injury prevention, and educational activities designed to improve the health of United States citizens. The CDC also conducts research and provides information on non-infectious diseases, such as obesity and diabetes, and is a founding member of the International Association of National Public Health Institutes.

During the second Trump administration, the CDC faced major disruptions, including orders to halt cooperation with the World Health Organization, remove or restrict access to public health information, and pause agency communications, including a temporary suspension of the Morbidity and Mortality Weekly Report. The administration also imposed content restrictions on scientific research, carried out large-scale layoffs and program cuts, and oversaw repeated leadership changes. Public health experts and medical organizations warned that these actions undermined scientific independence, public health capacity, and institutional stability.

In February 2026, Scientific American wrote that trust in the CDC has "plummeted under" HHS secretary Robert F. Kennedy Jr. As the CDC's databases are no longer maintained with accurate and up-to-date information, a "shadow CDC" of states and medical societies is forming to fill the vacuum.

The current CDC director, Dr. Erica Schwartz, was confirmed by the U.S. Senate on August 5, 2026 with a vote of 51–44.

== History ==
=== Establishment ===
The Communicable Disease Center was founded July 1, 1946, as the successor to the World War II Malaria Control in War Areas program of the Office of National Defense Malaria Control Activities.

Preceding its founding, organizations with global influence in malaria control were the Malaria Commission of the League of Nations and the Rockefeller Foundation. The Rockefeller Foundation greatly supported malaria control, sought to have the governments take over some of its efforts, and collaborated with the agency.

The new agency was a branch of the U.S. Public Health Service and Atlanta was chosen as the location because malaria was endemic in the Southern United States. The agency changed names before adopting the name Communicable Disease Center in 1946. Offices were located on the sixth floor of the Volunteer Building on Peachtree Street.

With a budget at the time of about $1 million, 59 percent of its personnel were engaged in mosquito abatement and habitat control with the objective of control and eradication of malaria in the United States.

Among its 369 employees, the main jobs at CDC were originally entomology and engineering. In CDC's initial years, more than six and a half million homes were sprayed, mostly with DDT. In 1946, there were only seven medical officers on duty and an early organization chart was drawn. Under Joseph Walter Mountin, the CDC continued to be an advocate for public health issues and pushed to extend its responsibilities to many other communicable diseases.

In 1947, the CDC made a token payment of $10 to Emory University for 15 acres (61,000 m^{2}) of land on Clifton Road in DeKalb County, still the home of CDC headquarters as of 2025. CDC employees collected the money to make the purchase. The benefactor behind the "gift" was Robert W. Woodruff, chairman of the board of the Coca-Cola Company. Woodruff had a long-time interest in malaria control, which had been a problem in areas where he went hunting. The same year, the PHS transferred its San Francisco based plague laboratory into the CDC as the Epidemiology Division, and a new Veterinary Diseases Division was established.

The CDC inherited the Tuskegee syphilis experiment from its predecessor, the U.S. Public Health Service. In the study, which lasted from 1932 to 1972, a group of Black men (nearly 400 of whom had syphilis) were studied to learn more about the disease. The disease was left untreated in the men, who had not given their informed consent to serve as research subjects.

=== Growth ===
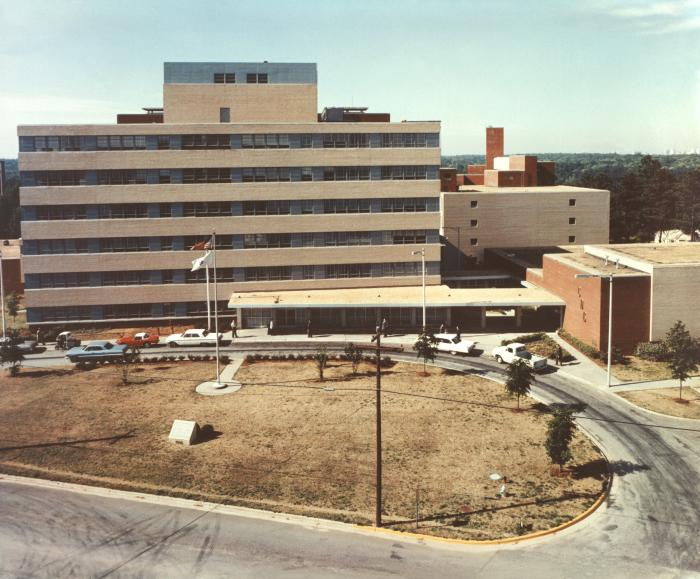
The Communicable Disease Center moved to its current headquarters in 1960. Building 1 is pictured in 1963.

In 1951, Chief Epidemiologist Alexander Langmuir's warnings of potential biological warfare during the Korean War spurred the creation of the Epidemic Intelligence Service (EIS) as a two-year postgraduate training program in epidemiology. The success of the EIS program led to the launch of Field Epidemiology Training Programs (FETP) in 1980, training more than 18,000 disease detectives in over 80 countries. In 2020, FETP celebrated the 40th anniversary of the CDC's support for Thailand's Field Epidemiology Training Program. Thailand was the first FETP site created outside of North America and is found in numerous countries, reflecting CDC's influence in promoting this model internationally. The Training Programs in Epidemiology and Public Health Interventions Network (TEPHINET) has graduated 950 students.

The mission of the CDC expanded beyond its original focus on malaria to include sexually transmitted diseases when the Venereal Disease Division of the U.S. Public Health Service (PHS) was transferred to the CDC in 1957. Shortly thereafter, Tuberculosis Control was transferred (in 1960) to the CDC from PHS, and then in 1963 the Immunization program was established.

It became the National Communicable Disease Center effective July 1, 1967, and the Center for Disease Control on June 24, 1970. At the end of the Public Health Service reorganizations of 1966–1973, it was promoted to being a principal operating agency of PHS.

=== 1980–2018 ===
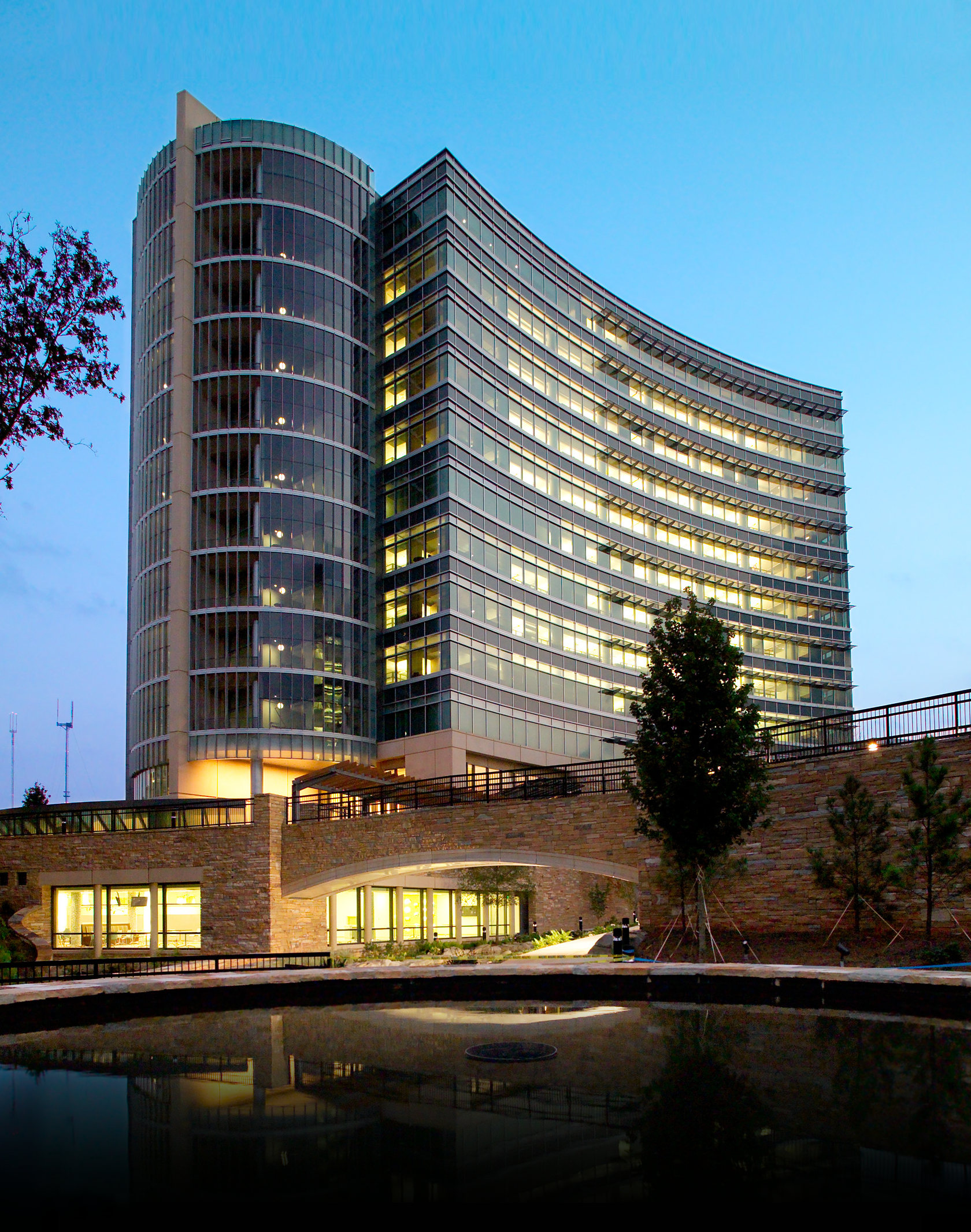
Arlen Specter Headquarters and Emergency Operations Center

The organization was renamed to the plural Centers for Disease Control effective October 14, 1980, as the modern organization of having multiple constituent centers was established. By 1990, it had four centers formed in the 1980s: the Center for Infectious Diseases, Center for Chronic Disease Prevention and Health Promotion, the Center for Environmental Health and Injury Control, and the Center for Prevention Services; as well as two centers that had been absorbed by CDC from outside: the National Institute for Occupational Safety and Health in 1973, and the National Center for Health Statistics in 1987.

An act of the United States Congress appended the words "and Prevention" to the name effective October 27, 1992. However, Congress directed that the initialism CDC be retained because of its name recognition. Since the 1990s, the CDC focus has broadened to include chronic diseases, disabilities, injury control, workplace hazards, environmental health threats, and terrorism preparedness. CDC combats emerging diseases and other health risks, including birth defects, West Nile virus, obesity, avian, swine, and pandemic flu, E. coli, and bioterrorism, to name a few. The organization would also prove to be an important factor in preventing the abuse of penicillin. In May 1994 the CDC admitted having sent samples of communicable diseases to the Iraqi government from 1984 through 1989 which were subsequently repurposed for biological warfare, including Botulinum toxin, West Nile virus, Yersinia pestis and Dengue fever virus.

In 1992, Mark L. Rosenberg and five CDC colleagues founded the CDC's National Center for Injury Prevention and Control, with an annual budget of approximately $260,000. They focused on "identifying causes of firearm deaths, and methods to prevent them". Their first report, published in the New England Journal of Medicine in 1993 entitled "Guns are a Risk Factor for Homicide in the Home", reported "mere presence of a gun in a home increased the risk of a firearm-related death by 2.7 percent, and suicide fivefold – a "huge" increase". In response, the National Rifle Association of America launched a "campaign to shut down the Injury Center". Two conservative pro-gun groups, Doctors for Responsible Gun Ownership and Doctors for Integrity and Policy Research joined the pro-gun effort, and, by 1995, politicians also supported the pro-gun initiative. In 1996, Jay Dickey (R) Arkansas introduced the Dickey Amendment stating "none of the funds available for injury prevention and control at the Centers for Disease Control and Prevention may be used to advocate or promote gun control" as a rider in the 1996 appropriations bill. Advocates for gun control opposed the amendment and continued to try to overturn it after it was passed. In 1997, "Congress re-directed all of the money for gun research to the study of traumatic brain injury." David Satcher, CDC head 1993–98 advocated for firearms research.

On April 21, 2005, then–CDC director Julie Gerberding formally announced the reorganization of CDC to "confront the challenges of 21st-century health threats". She established four coordinating centers. In 2009 the Obama administration re-evaluated this change and ordered them cut as an unnecessary management layer.

On May 16, 2011, the Centers for Disease Control and Prevention's blog published an article instructing the public on what to do to prepare for a zombie invasion. While the article did not claim that such a scenario was possible, it did use the popular culture appeal as a means of urging citizens to prepare for all potential hazards, such as earthquakes, tornadoes, and floods.

According to David Daigle, the associate director for communications, public health preparedness and response, the idea arose when his team was discussing their upcoming hurricane-information campaign and Daigle mused that "we say pretty much the same things every year, in the same way, and I just wonder how many people are paying attention." A social-media employee mentioned that the subject of zombies had come up a lot on Twitter when she had been tweeting about the Fukushima Daiichi nuclear disaster and radiation. The team realized that a campaign like this would most likely reach a different audience from the one that normally pays attention to hurricane-preparedness warnings and went to work on the zombie campaign, launching it right before hurricane season began. "The whole idea was, if you're prepared for a zombie apocalypse, you're prepared for pretty much anything," said Daigle.

Once the blog article was posted, the CDC announced an open contest for YouTube submissions of the most creative and effective videos covering preparedness for a zombie apocalypse (or apocalypse of any kind), to be judged by the "CDC Zombie Task Force". Submissions were open until October 11, 2011. They also released a zombie-themed graphic novella available on their website. Zombie-themed educational materials for teachers are available on the site.

In 2013, the American Medical Association, the American Psychological Association, and the American Academy of Pediatrics sent a letter to the leaders of the Senate Appropriations Committee asking them "to support at least $10 million within the Centers for Disease Control and Prevention (CDC) in FY 2014 along with sufficient new taxes at the National Institutes of Health to support research into the causes and prevention of violence. Furthermore, we urge Members to oppose any efforts to reduce, eliminate, or condition CDC funding related to violence prevention research." Congress maintained the ban in subsequent budgets. In 2016 over a dozen "public health insiders, including current and former CDC senior leaders" told The Trace interviewers that CDC senior leaders took a cautious stance in their interpretation of the Dickey Amendment and that they could do more but were afraid of political and personal retribution.

As of 2013, the CDC's Biosafety Level 4 laboratories were among the few that exist in the world. They included one of only two official repositories of smallpox in the world, with the other one located at the State Research Center of Virology and Biotechnology VECTOR in the Russian Federation. In 2014, the CDC revealed they had discovered several misplaced smallpox samples while their lab workers were "potentially infected" with anthrax.

The city of Atlanta annexed the property of the CDC headquarters effective January 1, 2018, as a part of the city's largest annexation within a period of 65 years; the Atlanta City Council had voted to do so the prior December. The CDC and Emory University had requested that the Atlanta city government annex the area, paving the way for a MARTA expansion through the Emory campus, funded by city tax dollars. The headquarters were located in an unincorporated area, statistically in the Druid Hills census-designated place.

=== COVID-19 ===
The CDC has been widely criticized for its handling of the COVID-19 pandemic. In 2022, CDC director Rochelle Walensky acknowledged "some pretty dramatic, pretty public mistakes, from testing to data to communications", based on the findings of an internal examination.

The first confirmed case of COVID-19 was discovered in the U.S. on January 20, 2020. However, widespread COVID-19 testing in the United States was effectively stalled until February 28, when federal officials revised a faulty CDC test, and days afterward, when the Food and Drug Administration began loosening rules that had restricted other labs from developing tests. In February 2020, as the CDC's early coronavirus test malfunctioned nationwide, CDC Director Robert R. Redfield reassured fellow officials on the White House Coronavirus Task Force that the problem would be quickly solved, according to White House officials. It took about three weeks to sort out the failed test kits, which may have been contaminated during their processing in a CDC lab. Later investigations by the FDA and the Department of Health and Human Services found that the CDC had violated its own protocols in developing its tests. In November 2020, NPR reported that an internal review document they obtained revealed that the CDC was aware that the first batch of tests which were issued in early January had a chance of being wrong 33 percent of the time, but they released them anyway.

In May 2020, The Atlantic reported that the CDC was conflating the results of two different types of coronavirus tests – tests that diagnose current coronavirus infections, and tests that measure whether someone has ever had the virus. The magazine said this distorted several important metrics, provided the country with an inaccurate picture of the state of the pandemic, and overstated the country's testing ability.

In July 2020, the Trump administration ordered hospitals to bypass the CDC and instead send all COVID-19 patient information to a database at the Department of Health and Human Services. Some health experts opposed the order and warned that the data might become politicized or withheld from the public. On July 15, the CDC alarmed health care groups by temporarily removing COVID-19 dashboards from its website. It restored the data a day later.

In August 2020, the CDC recommended that people showing no COVID-19 symptoms do not need testing. The new guidelines alarmed many public health experts. The guidelines were crafted by the White House Coronavirus Task Force without the sign-off of Anthony Fauci of the NIH. Objections by other experts at the CDC went unheard. Officials said that a CDC document in July arguing for "the importance of reopening schools" was also crafted outside the CDC. On August 16, the chief of staff, Kyle McGowan, and his deputy, Amanda Campbell, resigned from the agency. The testing guidelines were reversed on September 18, 2020, after public controversy.

In September 2020, the CDC drafted an order requiring masks on all public transportation in the United States, but the White House Coronavirus Task Force blocked the order, refusing to discuss it, according to two federal health officials.

In October 2020, it was disclosed that White House advisers had repeatedly altered the writings of CDC scientists about COVID-19, including recommendations on church choirs, social distancing in bars and restaurants, and summaries of public-health reports.

In the lead up to 2020 Thanksgiving, the CDC advised Americans not to travel for the holiday saying, "It's not a requirement. It's a recommendation for the American public to consider." The White House coronavirus task force had its first public briefing in months on that date but travel was not mentioned.

The New York Times later concluded that the CDC's decisions to "ben[d] to political pressure from the Trump White House to alter key public health guidance or withhold it from the public [...] cost it a measure of public trust that experts say it still has not recaptured" as of 2022.

In May 2021, following criticism by scientists, the CDC updated its COVID-19 guidance to acknowledge airborne transmission of COVID-19, after having previously claimed that the majority of infections occurred via "close contact, not airborne transmission".

In December 2021, following a request from the CEO of Delta Air Lines, CDC shortened its recommended isolation period for asymptomatic individuals infected with COVID-19 from 10 days to five.

Until 2022, the CDC withheld critical data about COVID-19 vaccine boosters, hospitalizations and wastewater data.

On June 10, 2022, the Biden Administration ordered the CDC to remove the COVID-19 testing requirement for air travelers entering the United States.

==== Morbidity and Mortality Weekly Report modifications ====
During the pandemic, the CDC Morbidity and Mortality Weekly Report (MMWR) came under pressure from political appointees at the Department of Health and Human Services (HHS) to modify its reporting so as not to conflict with what Trump was saying about the pandemic.

Starting in June 2020, Michael Caputo, the HHS assistant secretary for public affairs, and his chief advisor Paul Alexander tried to delay, suppress, change, and retroactively edit MMR releases about the effectiveness of potential treatments for COVID-19, the transmissibility of the virus, and other issues where the president had taken a public stance. Alexander tried unsuccessfully to get personal approval of all issues of MMWR before they went out.

Caputo claimed this oversight was necessary because MMWR reports were being tainted by "political content"; he demanded to know the political leanings of the scientists who reported that hydroxychloroquine had little benefit as a treatment while Trump was saying the opposite. In emails Alexander accused CDC scientists of attempting to "hurt the president" and writing "hit pieces on the administration".

In October 2020, emails obtained by Politico showed that Alexander requested multiple alterations in a report. The published alterations included a title being changed from "Children, Adolescents, and Young Adults" to "Persons." One current and two former CDC officials who reviewed the email exchanges said they were troubled by the "intervention to alter scientific reports viewed as untouchable prior to the Trump administration" that "appeared to minimize the risks of the coronavirus to children by making the report's focus on children less clear."

==== Trust in the CDC after COVID-19 ====
A poll conducted in September 2020 found that nearly 8 in 10 Americans trusted the CDC, a decrease from 87 percent in April 2020. Another poll showed an even larger drop in trust with the results dropping 16 percentage points. By January 2022, according to an NBC News poll, only 44% of Americans trusted the CDC compared to 69% at the beginning of the pandemic. As the trustworthiness eroded, so too did the information it disseminates. The diminishing level of trust in the CDC and the information releases also incited "vaccine hesitancy" with the result that "just 53 percent of Americans said they would be somewhat or extremely likely to get a vaccine."

In September 2020, amid the accusations and the faltering image of the CDC, the agency's leadership was called into question. Former acting director at the CDC, Richard Besser, said of Redfield that "I find it concerning that the CDC director has not been outspoken when there have been instances of clear political interference in the interpretation of science." In addition, Mark Rosenberg, the first director of CDC's National Center for Injury Prevention and Control, also questioned Redfield's leadership and his lack of defense of the science.

Historically, the CDC has not been a political agency; however, the COVID-19 pandemic, and specifically the Trump administration's handling of the pandemic, resulted in a "dangerous shift" according to a previous CDC director and others. Four previous directors claim that the agency's voice was "muted for political reasons." Politicization of the agency has continued into the Biden administration as COVID-19 guidance is contradicted by State guidance and the agency is criticized as "CDC's credibility is eroding".

In 2021, the CDC, then under the leadership of the Biden administration, received criticism for its mixed messaging surrounding COVID-19 vaccines, mask-wearing guidance, and the state of the pandemic.

On August 17, 2022, Walensky said the CDC would make drastic changes in the wake of mistakes during the COVID-19 pandemic. She outlined an overhaul of how the CDC would analyze and share data and how they would communicate information to the general public. In her statement to all CDC employees, she said: "For 75 years, CDC and public health have been preparing for COVID-19, and in our big moment, our performance did not reliably meet expectations." Based on the findings of an internal report, Walensky concluded that "The CDC must refocus itself on public health needs, respond much faster to emergencies and outbreaks of disease, and provide information in a way that ordinary people and state and local health authorities can understand and put to use" (as summarized by the New York Times).

=== Second Trump administration ===
In January 2025, it was reported that a CDC official had ordered all CDC staff to stop working with the World Health Organization. Around January 31, 2025, several CDC websites, pages, and datasets related to HIV and STI prevention, LGBT and youth health became unavailable for viewing after the agency was ordered to comply with Donald Trump's executive order to remove all material of "diversity, equity, and inclusion" and "gender identity". Also in January 2025, due to a pause in communications imposed by the second Trump administration at federal health agencies, publication of the Morbidity and Mortality Weekly Report (MMWR) was halted, the first time that had happened since its inception in 1960. The president of the Infectious Diseases Society of America (IDSA) called the pause in publication a "disaster." Attempts to halt publication had been made by the first Trump administration after MMWR published information about COVID-19 that "conflicted with messaging from the White House." The pause in communications also caused the cancellation of a meeting between the CDC and IDSA about threats to public health regarding the H5N1 influenza virus.

On February 1, 2025, the CDC ordered its scientists to retract any not yet published research they had produced which included any of the following banned terms: "Gender, transgender, pregnant person, pregnant people, LGBT, transsexual, non-binary, nonbinary, assigned male at birth, assigned female at birth, biologically male, biologically female". Larry Gostin, director of the World Health Organization Center on Global Health Law, said that the directive amounted to censorship of not only government employees, but private citizens as well. For example, if the lead author of a submitted paper works for the CDC and withdraws their name from the submission, that kills the submission even if coauthors who are private scientists remain on it. Other censored topics include DEI, climate change, and HIV.

Following extensive public backlash, some, but not all, of the removed pages were reinstated. The CDC's censorship led to many researchers and journalists to preserve databases themselves, with many removed articles being uploaded to archival sites such as the Internet Archive.

On February 4, Doctors for America filed a federal lawsuit against the CDC, Food and Drug Administration, and Department of Health and Human Services, asking the removed websites to be put back online. On February 11, a judge ordered removed pages to be restored temporarily while the suit is being considered, citing doctors who said the removed materials were "vital for real-time clinical decision-making".

On February 14, 2025, around 1,300 CDC employees were laid off by the administration, which included all first-year officers of the Epidemic Intelligence Service. The cuts also terminated 16 of the 24 Laboratory Leadership Service program fellows, a program designed for early-career lab scientists to address laboratory testing shortcomings of the CDC. In the following month, the Trump administration quietly withdrew its CDC director nominee, Dave Weldon, just minutes before his scheduled Senate confirmation hearing on March 13.

In April 2025, it was reported that among the reductions is the elimination of the Freedom of Information Act team, the Division of Violence Prevention, laboratories involved in testing for antibiotic resistance, and the team responsible for determining recalls of hazardous infant products. Additional cuts affect the technology branch of the Center for Forecasting and Outbreak Analytics, which includes software engineers and computer scientists supporting the centre established during the COVID-19 pandemic to improve disease outbreak prediction.

In March 2025, a department-wide reorganization was announced that would have reoriented CDC towards infectious disease programs, absorbing the Administration for Strategic Preparedness and Response while losing its chronic disease and environmental and occupational health components to the new Administration for a Healthy America. These changes were, however, not carried out.

In August 2025, over 600 CDC employees were laid off and a number of programs completely dismantled, including "[m]aternal and child health services, oral health programs, and the CDC's long-running Violence Against Children and Youth Surveys (VACS)." Experts have criticized the mass layoffs under Secretary of Health and Human Services Robert F. Kennedy Jr. for creating dangerous gaps in public health. VACS, for instance, has played an essential role in gathering high-quality, actionable data used to assess and mitigate violent harm against children, with such harm being estimated as affecting half of all children worldwide.

In August 2026 Senate confirmation hearings, Dr. Erica Schwartz stated that "abortion surveillance" would be a "critical focus" for the CDC.

Later that month, Schwartz challenged two reported measles deaths in Pennsylvania.

==== 2025 headquarters shooting ====
On August 8, 2025, 30-year-old Patrick Joseph White of Kennesaw, Georgia, attacked the CDC's Roybal Campus in Atlanta, Georgia. White attempted to enter the headquarters, but was thwarted by security. White then drove across the street to a CVS Pharmacy where he barricaded himself inside on the second floor, and fired at the campus with a rifle, striking four CDC buildings on multiple floors over 180 times, breaking about 150 windows and piercing some of the blast-resistant windows; authorities recovered more than 500 shell casings and five firearms after the shooting. 33-year-old David Rose, a DeKalb County Police Department officer, was fatally wounded by White as he arrived on the scene. Officers entered the pharmacy and found White dead from a self-inflicted gunshot wound.

White is believed to have been motivated by distrust in vaccines, and believed the COVID-19 vaccine had made him depressed and suicidal. He had reached out for mental health assistance for weeks before the attack. Fired But Fighting, a group of laid-off CDC employees, blamed the attack on the anti-vaccine rhetoric of members of the Trump administration, saying that Secretary of Health and Human Services, Robert F. Kennedy Jr., "is directly responsible for the villainization of CDC's workforce through his continuous lies about science and vaccine safety". A union representing CDC employees called on both the CDC and the leadership of the Department of Health and Human Services to denounce vaccine misinformation, and said that the attack was a result of compounding misinformation and obloquy towards science and health officials. While Kennedy Jr. had reached out to CDC staff and said "no one should face violence while working to protect the health of others", Jerome Adams, a former surgeon general, described Kennedy Jr.'s response as "tepid" and that Kennedy Jr. must do more given his past "inflammatory rhetoric". On August 11, Kennedy Jr. toured the Roybal Campus with deputy secretary Jim O'Neill and CDC director Susan Monarez, but did not speak with the media during the visit, although he did meet privately with Rose's widow. A day later, in an interview with Scripps News, when Kennedy Jr. was asked if he had a message for CDC employees concerned about the consequences of misinformation about vaccines, he said political violence was "wrong" and claimed not enough was known about White's motives yet to draw conclusions before criticizing the government's previous vaccination efforts as "overreaching" and that the government had said "things that are not always true" in order to get people vaccinated. Trump did not respond to the shooting of the police officer.

White's father spoke in an interview with WANF, saying that he and his wife were watching a cable television network in their Kennesaw home when the phone rang. He picked up the phone and attempted to have a normal conversation with his son. White spoke to his father, "I'm gonna shoot up the CDC", before hanging up afterward. The couple immediately changed their channel to one of the Atlanta stations, where his father saw the unmistakable image of his car at the scene.

==== 2025 advisory committee purge and leadership dispute ====
On May 14, 2025, HHS Secretary Robert F. Kennedy Jr. stated that lawyer Matthew Buzzelli was acting CDC director, though it was not listed on the CDC website.

In June 2025, Kennedy fired all 17 members of the Advisory Committee on Immunization Practices (ACIP) and—with one exception—appointed members who are either anti-vaccine activists or who lack expertise in vaccines.

Susan Monarez was confirmed as CDC head on July 31, 2025, but on August 27, it was announced on X (formerly Twitter) that she had been fired. Monarez disputed the legality of the firing, as it had not been carried out by the president, and it had been falsely reported that she had resigned. The president later officially carried out the firing. Monarez was fired after refusing to rubber stamp what were expected to be unscientific recommendations from ACIP and to fire senior staff vaccine experts. The next day, the Trump administration announced the selection of Deputy Secretary of Health and Human Services Jim O'Neill as a replacement.

Following news of Monarez's ouster, at least four other CDC senior officials announced their resignations:

- Debra Houry, Chief Medical Officer
- Demetre Daskalakis, Director of the National Center for Immunization and Respiratory Diseases
- Daniel Jernigan, Director of the National Center for Emerging and Zoonotic Infectious Diseases
- Jennifer Layden, Director of the Office of Public Health Data, Surveillance, and Technology, which contains the National Center for Health Statistics

Dozens of CDC employees walked out of headquarters and protested in support of Monarez and the departing officials.

In November 2025 it was announced that primate research at CDC is due to end.

== Organization ==
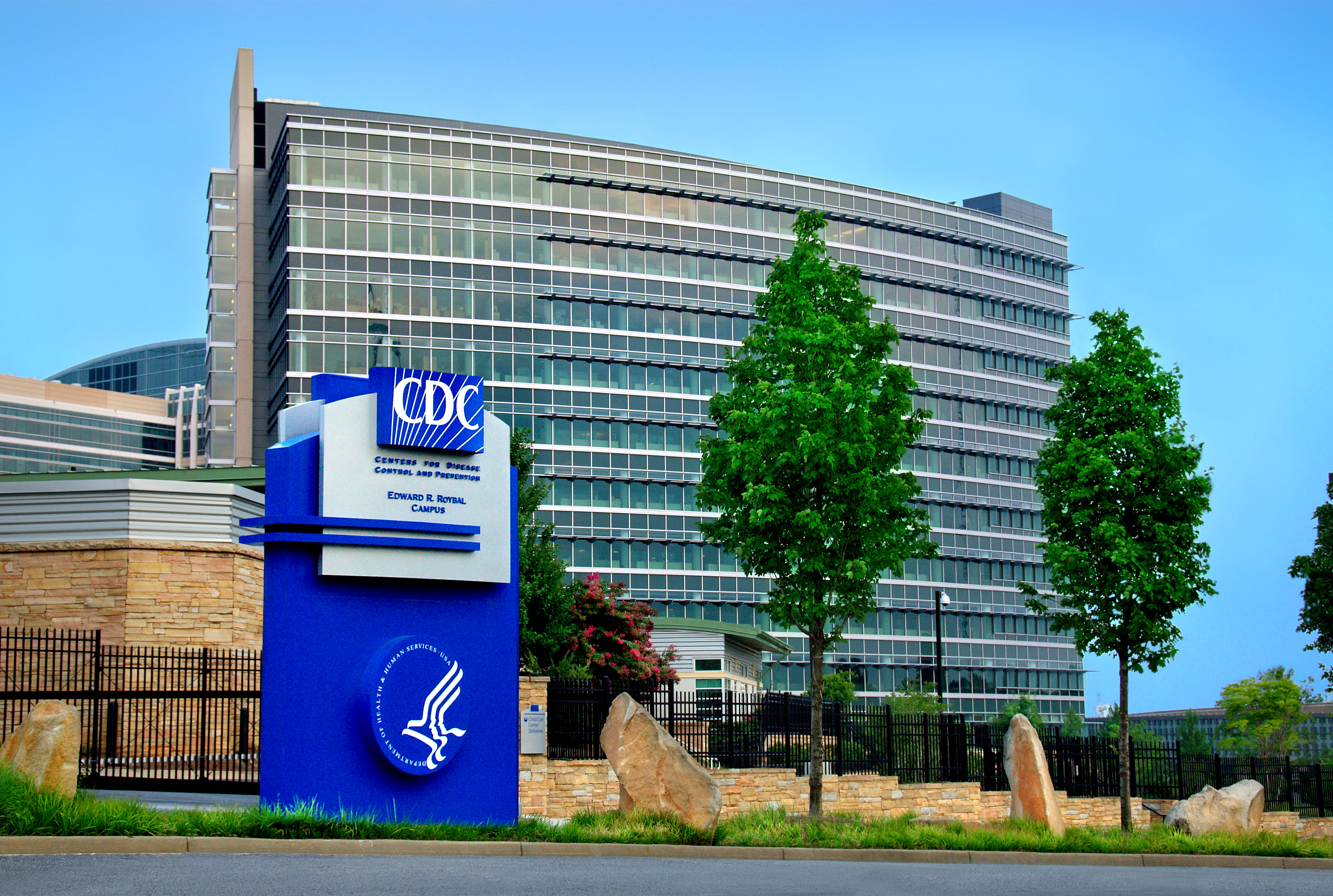
CDC's Roybal campus in Atlanta, Georgia

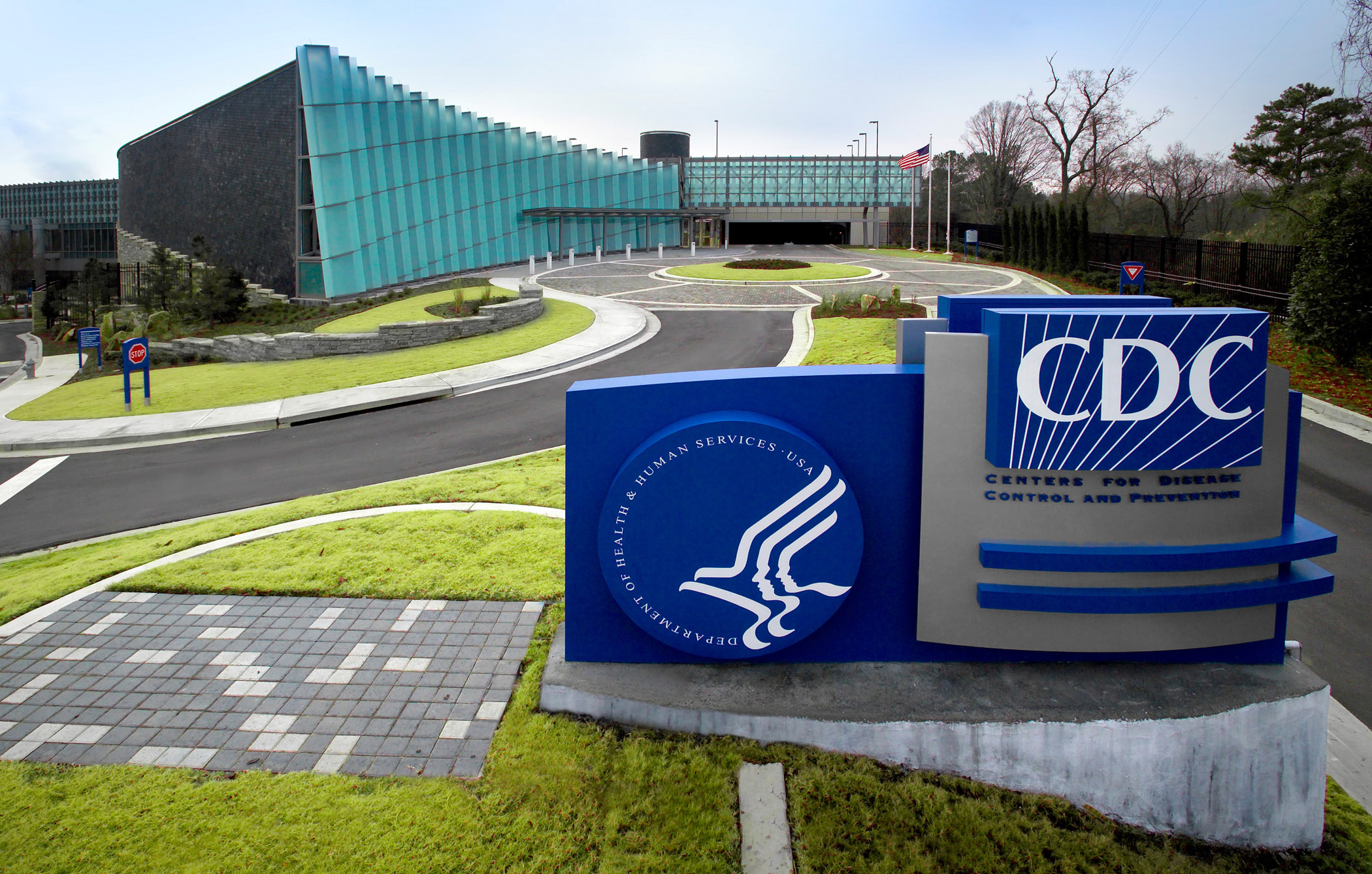
Tom Harkin Global Communications Center

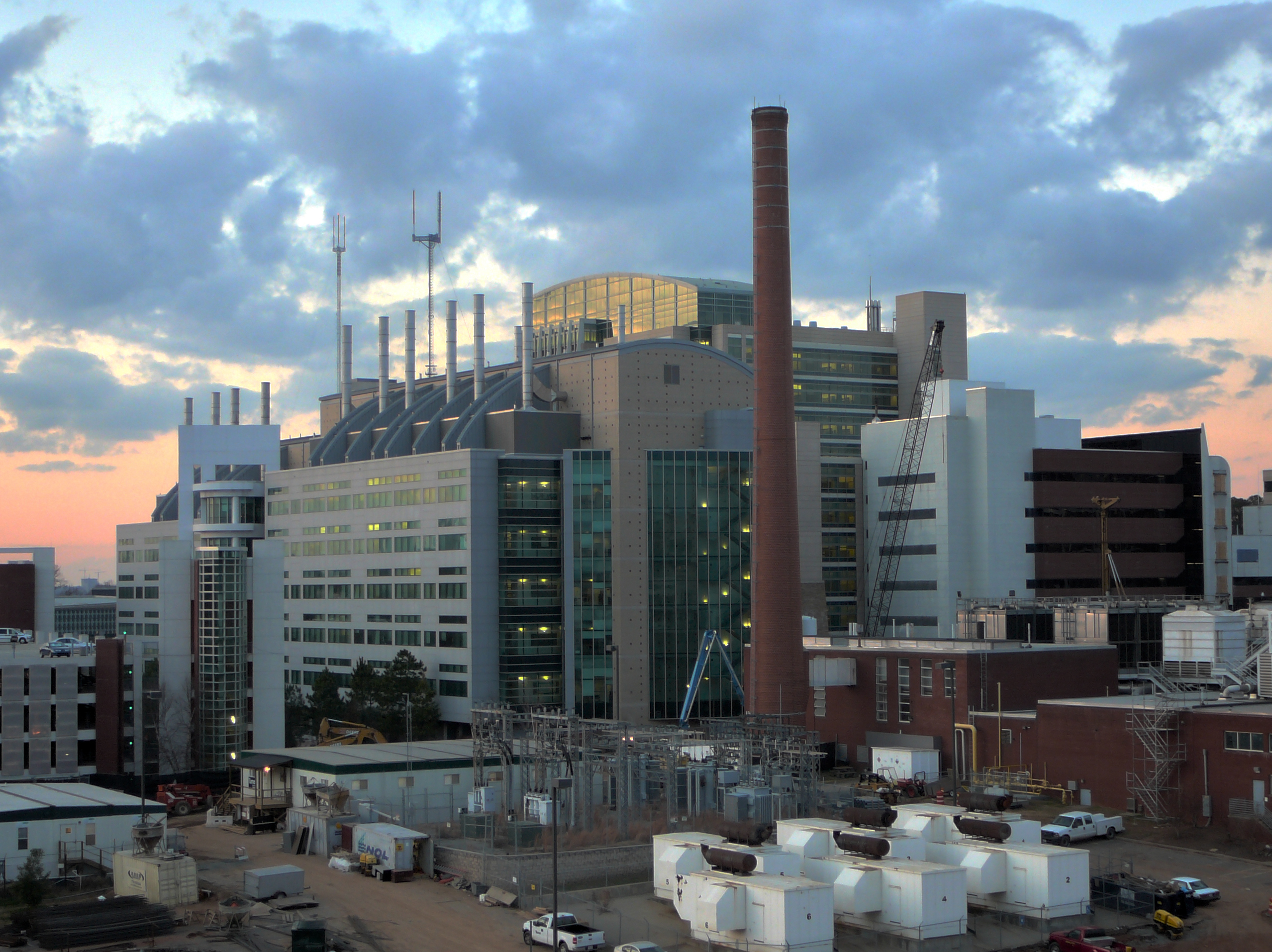
CDC Building 17 in Atlanta, Georgia, as seen from Emory University

The CDC is organized into centers, institutes, and offices (CIOs), with each organizational unit implementing the agency's activities in a particular area of expertise while also providing intra-agency support and resource-sharing for cross-cutting issues and specific health threats.

As of the most recent reorganization in February 2023, the CIOs are:

- National Center for Immunization and Respiratory Diseases
- National Center for Emerging and Zoonotic Infectious Diseases
  - Division of Global Migration Health
- National Center for HIV/AIDS, Viral Hepatitis, STD, and TB Prevention
- National Center on Birth Defects and Developmental Disabilities
- National Center for Chronic Disease Prevention and Health Promotion
- National Center for Environmental Health / Agency for Toxic Substances and Disease Registry
- National Center for Injury Prevention and Control
- National Institute for Occupational Safety and Health
- Public Health Infrastructure Center
- Global Health Center
- Immediate Office of the Director
  - Chief of Staff
  - Office of the Chief Operating Officer
  - Office of Policy, Performance, and Evaluation
  - Office of Equal Employment Opportunity and Workplace Equity
  - Office of Communications
  - Office of Health Equity
  - Office of Science
  - CDC Washington Office
  - Office of Laboratory Science and Safety
  - Office of Readiness and Response
    - Center for Forecasting and Outbreak Analytics
  - Office of Public Health Data, Surveillance, and Technology
    - National Center for Health Statistics

The Office of Public Health Preparedness was created during the 2001 anthrax attacks shortly after the terrorist attacks of September 11, 2001. Its purpose was to coordinate among the government the response to a range of biological terrorism threats.

=== Locations ===
Most CDC centers are located in the Atlanta metropolitan area, where it has three major campuses:

- The Chamblee Campus in Chamblee, Georgia, opened in 1946, inheriting the site and buildings of Lawson General Hospital immediately adjacent to but not part of Naval Air Station Atlanta. Although it was initially planned to be shut down when the Roybal Campus opened, it was found that the latter was not suitable for live animal facilities. The buildings were slowly replaced with modern buildings over time.
- The Roybal Campus in Atlanta is the largest, named in honor of the late representative Edward R. Roybal. It was originally called the Clifton Road Campus. Although its land was donated by adjacent Emory University in 1947, it did not open until 1960. Its Building 18, which opened in 2005, contains the premier BSL4 laboratory in the United States.
- The Lawrenceville Campus in Lawrenceville, Georgia, was acquired with the intent of being a destination for Chamblee's animal facilities if that campus was shut down. It was first developed in the early 1960s.

A few of the centers are based in or operate other domestic locations:

- The National Center for Health Statistics is primarily located in Hyattsville, Maryland, with a branch in Research Triangle Park in North Carolina.
- The National Institute for Occupational Safety and Health's primary locations are Cincinnati, Morgantown, Pittsburgh, Spokane, and Washington, D.C., with branches in Denver, Anchorage, and Atlanta.
- The CDC Washington Office is based in Washington, D.C.
- Two divisions of the National Center for Emerging and Zoonotic Infectious Diseases are based outside Atlanta: the Division of Vector-Borne Diseases is based in Fort Collins, Colorado, with a branch in San Juan, Puerto Rico; while the Arctic Investigations Program is based in Anchorage. In addition, the Division of Global Migration Health operates quarantine facilities in 20 cities in the U.S.

== Budget ==
The CDC budget for fiscal year 2024 is $11.581 billion.

== Workforce ==
As of 2021, CDC staff numbered approximately 15,000 personnel (including 6,000 contractors and 840 United States Public Health Service Commissioned Corps officers) in 170 occupations. Eighty percent held bachelor's degrees or higher; almost half had advanced degrees (a master's degree or a doctorate such as a PhD, D.O., or M.D.).

Common CDC job titles include engineer, entomologist, epidemiologist, biologist, physician, veterinarian, behavioral scientist, nurse, medical technologist, economist, public health advisor, health communicator, toxicologist, chemist, computer scientist, and statistician. The CDC also operates a number of notable training and fellowship programs, including those indicated below.

=== Epidemic Intelligence Service (EIS) ===
The Epidemic Intelligence Service (EIS) is composed of "boots-on-the-ground disease detectives" who investigate public health problems domestically and globally. When called upon by a governmental body, EIS officers may embark on short-term epidemiological assistance assignments, or "Epi-Aids", to provide technical expertise in containing and investigating disease outbreaks. The EIS program is a model for the international Field Epidemiology Training Program.

=== Public Health Associates Program ===
The CDC also operates the Public Health Associate Program (PHAP), a two-year paid fellowship for recent college graduates to work in public health agencies all over the United States. PHAP was founded in 2007 and currently has 159 associates in 34 states.

== Leadership ==
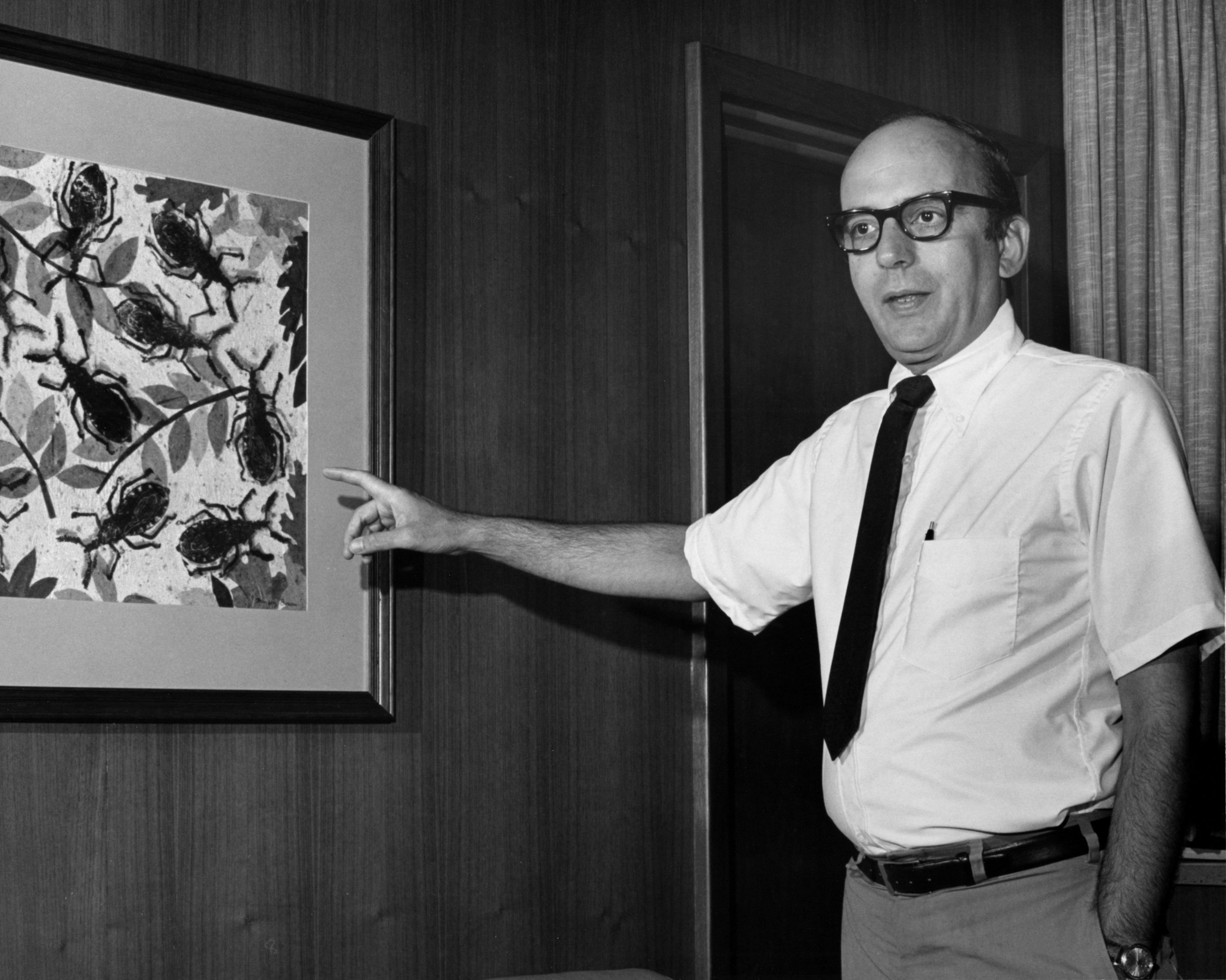
David Sencer points to a depiction of Triatomine sp., which transmits Chagas disease.

The director of the CDC is a position that currently requires Senate confirmation. The director serves at the pleasure of the president and may be fired at any time. The CDC director concurrently serves as the Administrator of the Agency for Toxic Substances and Disease Registry.

Prior to January 20, 2025, it was a Senior Executive Service position that could be filled either by a career employee, or as a political appointment that does not require Senate confirmation, with the latter method typically being used. The change to requiring Senate confirmation was due to a provision in the Consolidated Appropriations Act, 2023.

The CDC and its predecessor agencies have had more than twenty directors, including three during the Trump administration (including Anne Schuchat who twice served as acting director) and three during the Carter administration (including one acting director not shown here). Two served under Bill Clinton, but only one under the Nixon to Ford terms.

=== List of directors ===
The following persons have served as the director of the Centers for Disease Control and Prevention (or chief of the Communicable Disease Center):

No.	Portrait	Director	Term start	Term end	Refs.
1		Louis L. Williams Jr.	1942	1943	
2		Mark D. Hollis	1944	1946	
3		Raymond A. Vonderlehr	1947	December 1951	
4		Justin M. Andrews	January 1952	January 1953	
5		Theodore J. Bauer	January 15, 1953	August 1956	
6		Robert J. Anderson	October 1, 1956	June 30, 1960	
7		Clarence A. Smith	July 1960	August 1962	
8		James L. Goddard	September 1, 1962	January 1966	
9		David J. Sencer	February 1966	May 1977	
10		William H. Foege	May 1977	November 30, 1983	
11		James O. Mason	December 1, 1983	April 1989	
Acting		Walter Dowdle	April 1989	February 28, 1990	
12		William L. Roper	March 1, 1990	June 30, 1993	
Acting		Walter Dowdle	July 1, 1993	November 14, 1993	
13		David Satcher	November 15, 1993	February 13, 1998	
Acting		Claire V. Broome	February 14, 1998	October 4, 1998	
14		Jeffrey P. Koplan	October 5, 1998	March 31, 2002	
acting		David Fleming	April 1, 2002	June 2, 2002	
15		Julie Gerberding	June 3, 2002	January 20, 2009	
interim		William Gimson	January 20, 2009	January 22, 2009	
acting		Richard Besser	January 22, 2009	June 7, 2009	
16		Thomas R. Frieden	June 8, 2009	January 20, 2017	
acting		Anne Schuchat	January 20, 2017	July 6, 2017	
17		Brenda Fitzgerald	July 7, 2017	January 31, 2018	
acting		Anne Schuchat	February 1, 2018	March 26, 2018	
18		Robert R. Redfield	March 26, 2018	January 20, 2021	
19		Rochelle Walensky	January 20, 2021	June 30, 2023	
acting		Nirav D. Shah	July 1, 2023	July 10, 2023	
20		Mandy Cohen	July 10, 2023	January 20, 2025	
acting		Susan Monarez	January 23, 2025	March 24, 2025	
acting		Matthew Buzzelli	March 24, 2025	July 30, 2025	
21		Susan Monarez	July 31, 2025	August 27, 2025	
acting		Jim O'Neill	August 28, 2025	February 13, 2026	
acting		Jay Bhattacharya	February 18, 2026	August 12, 2026	
22		Erica Schwartz	August 13, 2026	Present	

== Datasets and survey systems ==
- CDC Scientific Data, Surveillance, Health Statistics, and Laboratory Information.
- Behavioral Risk Factor Surveillance System (BRFSS), the world's largest, ongoing telephone health-survey system.
- Pregnancy Risk Assessment Monitoring System (PRAMS), a surveillance system on maternal and infant health with telephone and mail questionnaires in English and Spanish in 50 US jurisdictions.
- Mortality Medical Data System.
- Abortion statistics in the United States
- CDC WONDER (Wide-ranging ONline Data for Epidemiologic Research)
- Data systems of the National Center for Health Statistics

In 2025, nearly half of the CDC databases faced unexplained pauses, mostly concerning vaccination surveillance. In October 2025, 38 publicly available CDC databases, which should be updated monthly, were not current, and by December 2025 only one of those databases had been updated. In addition to databases concerning vaccines, databases reporting on respiratory diseases and drug overdose deaths have also not been updated. The pauses to these databases being updated began mostly around when Robert F. Kennedy Jr. was confirmed as HHS secretary.

In February 2026, Scientific American wrote that trust in the CDC has "plummeted under [Kennedy's] watch". As the CDC's databases are no longer maintained with accurate and up-to-date information, a "shadow CDC" of states and medical societies is forming to fill the vacuum:

The agency has been a leading voice for evidence-backed health guidance and a sentinel for deadly disease outbreaks for decades. But over the past year, the CDC's authority has crumbled as the agency has replaced subject matter experts with vaccine deniers and discarded evidence in favor of ideology.

== Areas of focus ==
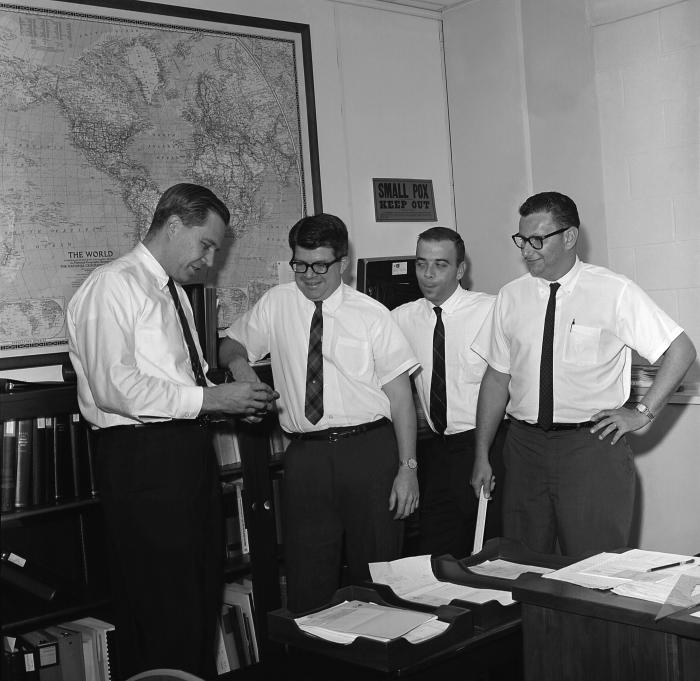
Donald Henderson as part of the CDC's smallpox eradication team in 1966

=== Communicable diseases ===
The CDC's programs address more than 400 diseases, health threats, and conditions that are major causes of death, disease, and disability. The CDC's website has information on various infectious (and noninfectious) diseases, including smallpox, measles, and others.

==== Influenza ====
The CDC targets the transmission of influenza, including the H1N1 swine flu, and launched websites to educate people about hygiene.

==== Division of Select Agents and Toxins ====
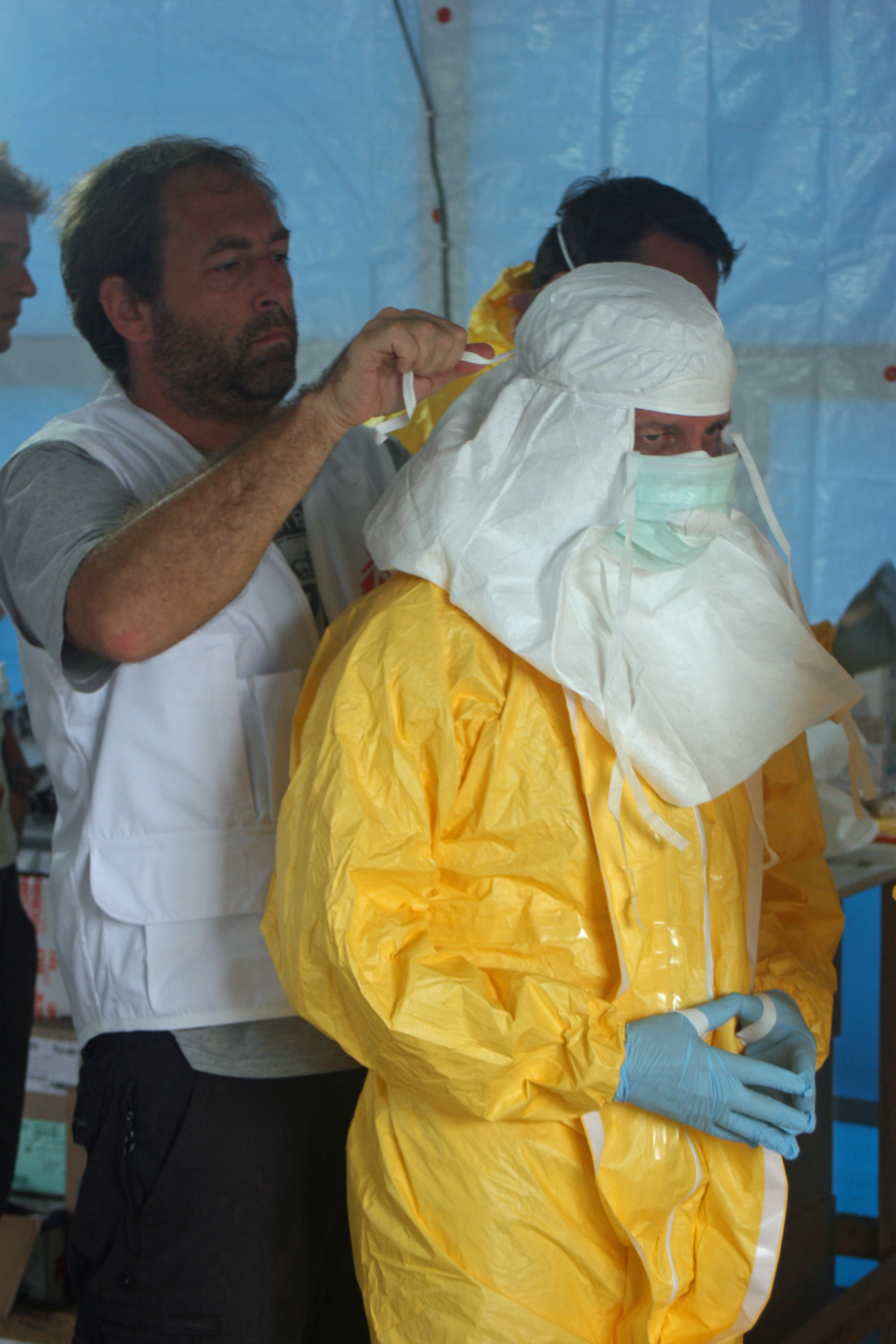
CDC and MSF staff preparing to enter an Ebola treatment unit in Liberia, August 2014

Within the division are two programs: the Federal Select Agent Program (FSAP) and the Import Permit Program. The FSAP is run jointly with an office within the U.S. Department of Agriculture, regulating agents that can cause disease in humans, animals, and plants. The Import Permit Program regulates the importation of "infectious biological materials."

The CDC runs a program that protects the public from rare and dangerous substances such as anthrax and the Ebola virus. The program, called the Federal Select Agent Program, calls for inspections of labs in the U.S. that work with dangerous pathogens.

During the 2014 Ebola outbreak in West Africa, the CDC helped coordinate the return of two infected American aid workers for treatment at Emory University Hospital, the home of a special unit to handle highly infectious diseases.

As a response to the 2014 Ebola outbreak, Congress passed a Continuing Appropriations Resolution allocating $30,000,000 towards CDC's efforts to fight the virus.

=== Non-communicable diseases ===
The CDC also works on non-communicable diseases, including chronic diseases caused by obesity, physical inactivity and tobacco-use. The work of the Division for Cancer Prevention and Control, led from 2010 by Lisa C. Richardson, is also within this remit.

=== Antibiotic resistance ===
The CDC implemented their National Action Plan for Combating Antibiotic Resistant Bacteria as a measure against the spread of antibiotic resistance in the United States. This initiative has a budget of $161 million and includes the development of the Antibiotic Resistance Lab Network.

=== Global health ===
Globally, the CDC works with other organizations to address global health challenges and contain disease threats at their source. They work with many international organizations such as the World Health Organization (WHO) as well as ministries of health and other groups on the front lines of outbreaks. The agency maintains staff in more than 60 countries, including some from the U.S. but more from the countries in which they operate. The agency's global divisions include the Division of Global HIV and TB (DGHT), the Division of Parasitic Diseases and Malaria (DPDM), the Division of Global Health Protection (DGHP), and the Global Immunization Division (GID).

The CDC has been working with the WHO to implement the International Health Regulations (IHR), an agreement between 196 countries to prevent, control, and report on the international spread of disease, through initiatives including the Global Disease Detection Program (GDD).

The CDC has also been involved in implementing the U.S. global health initiatives President's Emergency Plan for AIDS Relief (PEPFAR) and President's Malaria Initiative.

=== Travelers' health ===
The CDC collects and publishes health information for travelers in a comprehensive book, CDC Health Information for International Travel, which is commonly known as the "yellow book." The book is available online and in print as a new edition every other year and includes current travel health guidelines, vaccine recommendations, and information on specific travel destinations. The CDC also issues travel health notices on its website, consisting of three levels:

- "Watch": Level 1 (practice usual precautions)
- "Alert": Level 2 (practice enhanced precautions)
- "Warning": Level 3 (avoid nonessential travel)

=== Vaccine safety ===
The CDC uses a number of tools to monitor the safety of vaccines. The Vaccine Adverse Event Reporting System (VAERS), a national vaccine safety surveillance program run by CDC and the FDA. "VAERS detects possible safety issues with U.S. vaccines by collecting information about adverse events (possible side effects or health problems) after vaccination." The CDC's Safety Information by Vaccine page provides a list of the latest safety information, side effects, and answers to common questions about CDC recommended vaccines.

The Vaccine Safety Datalink (VSD) works with a network of healthcare organizations to share data on vaccine safety and adverse events. The Clinical Immunization Safety Assessment (CISA) project is a network of vaccine experts and health centers that research and assist the CDC in the area of vaccine safety.

CDC also runs a program called V-safe, a smartphone web application that allows COVID-19 vaccine recipients to be surveyed in detail about their health in response to getting the shot.

=== CDC revises stance on autism and vaccines ===
Under the leadership of HHS Secretary Robert F. Kennedy Jr., the CDC's web page on "Autism and Vaccines" was radically changed. Before the change, the web page concluded that "Studies have shown that there is no link between receiving vaccines and developing autism spectrum disorder". In November 2025, the guideline was reversed, stating "The claim ‘vaccines do not cause autism’ is not an evidence-based claim because studies have not ruled out the possibility that infant vaccines cause autism".

In an interview, Kennedy reportedly said that he personally instructed the CDC to abandon its longstanding position that vaccines do not cause autism.

Numerous sources commented on the change.

According to The New York Times, the move shows Kennedy's determination to challenge scientific consensus and bend the health department to his will, though "dozens of scientific studies have failed to find evidence of a link" between autism and vaccines.

The Washington Post wrote:

The Centers for Disease Control and Prevention has repudiated its past insistence that vaccines do not cause autism after decades of fighting misinformation linking the two, blindsiding career staff and delighting anti-vaccine activists.
The agency's website on vaccines and autism, updated Wednesday, now makes several false claims about a connection, echoing longtime rhetoric from Health Secretary Robert F. Kennedy Jr., who has a lengthy history of disparaging vaccines and linking them to autism.

FactCheck.org wrote that the change was not evidence-based and quoted David S. Mandell, a psychiatry professor at the University of Pennsylvania Perelman School of Medicine and director of the Penn Center for Mental Health:

"As any scientist knows, you can't 'prove' the lack of association. You conduct related studies, over and over, until the bulk of evidence finds no association." He added: The "CDC page is the equivalent of 'you haven't proven that ghosts don't exist' or perhaps more to the point, 'you haven't proven that driving during pregnancy doesn't cause autism, so pregnant women should stop driving.'"

Many medical associations and journals have issued statements and protests against the changes:

- American Academy of Pediatrics
- Autism Science Foundation
- American Public Health Association, the largest professional organization of public health professionals in the United States, represents numerous organizations and more than 25,000 members worldwide
- Infectious Diseases Society of America (and HIV Medicine Association, Association for Professionals in Infection Control and Epidemiology, Society for Healthcare Epidemiology of America, Society of Infectious Diseases Pharmacists)
- American Medical Association
- The BMJ
- Center for Infectious Disease Research and Policy

In February 2026, Scientific American wrote that trust in the CDC has "plummeted under [Kennedy's] watch". As the CDC's databases are no longer maintained with accurate and up-to-date information, a "shadow CDC" of states and medical societies is forming to fill the vacuum.

In an attempt to counter the ensuing lack of accurate official governmental information on autism caused by R. F. Kennedy Jr's actions, former NIH institute directors, autism researchers, and advocacy leaders have established the Independent Autism Coordinating Committee to coordinate work among nongovernment autism research funders and create a scientific agenda for the autism community.

== CDC Foundation ==
The CDC Foundation operates independently from CDC as a private, nonprofit 501(c)(3) organization incorporated in the State of Georgia. The creation of the foundation was authorized by section 399F of the Public Health Service Act to support the mission of CDC in partnership with the private sector, including organizations, foundations, businesses, educational groups, and individuals. From 1995 to 2022, the foundation raised over $1.6 billion and launched more than 1,200 health programs. Bill Cosby formerly served as a member of the foundation's Board of Directors, continuing as an honorary member after completing his term.

The foundation engages in research projects and health programs in more than 160 countries every year, including in focus areas such as cardiovascular disease, cancer, emergency response, and infectious diseases, particularly HIV/AIDS, Ebola, rotavirus, and COVID-19.

- EmPOWERED Health Program: Launched in November 2019 with funding from Amgen, the program works to empower cancer patients to become actively involved in the decision making around their treatments.
- Fries Prize for Improving Health: An annual prize first awarded in 1992 that "recognizes an individual who has made major accomplishments in health improvement and with the general criteria of the greatest good for the greatest number".

In 2015, BMJ associate editor Jeanne Lenzer raised concerns that the CDC's recommendations and publications may be influenced by donations received through the foundation, which includes pharmaceutical companies.

== Publications ==
- CDC publications
- State of CDC report
- CDC Programs in Brief
- Morbidity and Mortality Weekly Report
- Emerging Infectious Diseases (monthly journal)
- Preventing Chronic Disease
- Vital statistics

== See also ==
- Gun violence in the United States
- Haddon Matrix
- List of national public health agencies
- Safe Kids Worldwide

=== CDC Departments ===
- ATSDR – CDC department
- NIOSH – CDC department
  - N95 respirator – regulated by NIOSH
  - Division of Industrial Hygiene – predecessor to NIOSH

=== Other US Executive Departments ===
- MSHA – co-regulator of respirators prior to 1998
  - Bureau of Mines – predecessor to MSHA
- National Highway Traffic Safety Administration
- OSHA
