= John R. Heller Jr. =

American physician (1905–1989)

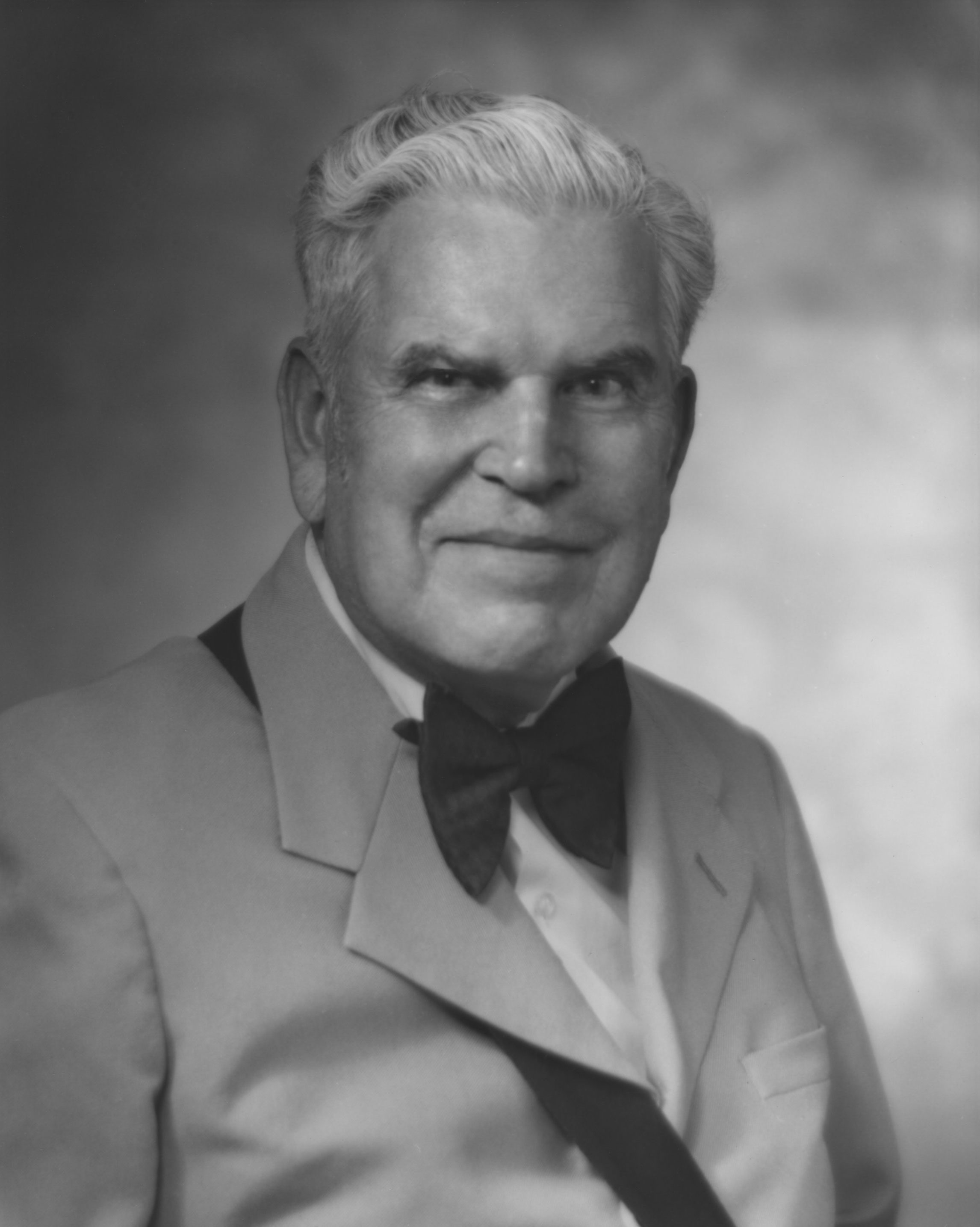
- Heller in 1976
- Born: John Roderick Heller; February 27, 1905; Fair Play, South Carolina, US
- Died: May 4, 1989 (aged 83); Bethesda, Maryland
- Education: Clemson University (BS); Emory University School of Medicine (MD)
- Scientific career
- Fields: Epidemiology; bacteriology; oncology
- Workplaces: National Cancer Institute; Memorial Sloan-Kettering Cancer Center

John Roderick 'Rod' Heller (February 27, 1905 – May 4, 1989) was an American physician. From 1943 to 1948 he was the director of the "Venereal Disease" section of the United States Public Health Service (PHS). He then became the director of the National Cancer Institute, and then president/chief executive officer of the Memorial Sloan-Kettering Cancer Center in New York City.

Dr. Heller is best known for having been the assistant in charge of on-site medical operations in the Tuskegee syphilis study, a longitudinal clinical examination by PHS of untreated syphilis in U.S. African-American males. Very serious questions of medical ethics have been raised about this study and those involved in it.

== Biography ==
=== Tuskegee syphilis study ===
A native of the U.S. South, Heller was born in South Carolina. He was directly descended, on both his father's and his mother's side, from soldiers who had fought for the Confederate States of America. He was awarded a bachelor of science degree from Clemson University in 1925, and graduated in 1929 from Emory University School of Medicine. In 1930, shortly after completing his internship, he began working in public health and was commissioned in 1934 in the United States Public Health Service. He specialized in the epidemiology of sexually transmitted diseases. As part of his specialist research, Heller assisted Raymond A. Vonderlehr, a clinician and epidemiologist who was one of the chief originators of what became the Tuskegee syphilis study. As the Tuskegee study's on-site director, Vonderlehr led a key transitional move in 1933: the clinicians identified groups of patients, persons they were already examining and who were known to be infected, as potential subjects in a prospective cohort study of the progressive effects of syphilis on human neuroanatomy.

The Tuskegee study used painful diagnostic tests, including spinal taps, which were deceitfully described as 'treatments.' State-of-the-art treatments for syphilis were not fully effective in the 1930s. Vonderlehr was Heller's mentor at the time, and selected Heller to be his assistant in charge of on-site medical operations at Tuskegee. Both Vonderlehr and Heller were seen as doing good work in the Venereal Disease Section of PHS, and Vonderlehr served as head of the Section until his retirement in 1943. Sexually transmitted diseases were seen as a major scourge of the time, and published data (including at least one study co-authored by Heller) of the neurological and other complications that were beginning to be experienced by some Tuskegee patients only increased the level of salience given to public-health work in this specialty. Heller believed that it was his duty to learn as much about long-term syphilis, and its complications, as he could. As he recalled in 1964:

We learned many, many things about the treatment of syphilis, and I saw syphilis in all of its stages, early and late.

When Vonderlehr stepped down, Heller succeeded him as head of the Section. At this time, the fight against sexually transmitted disease was seen as more urgent than ever; the United States was carrying out the widespread mobilization of young men for service in World War II.

Heller's overall work was aided, starting in 1944, with the dissemination of penicillin as a treatment for syphilis. Production of the new "wonder drug" was made a priority for U.S. servicemen, including servicemen diagnosed with syphilis; however, penicillin took longer to manufacture for civilians, including civilians treated by the U.S. Public Health Service. Although Heller continued to serve as head of the venereal disease section of PHS, the drug was not provided to patients in the Tuskegee study. Their neurological and other complications continued and worsened, but the study had been underemphasized and its patients forgotten by medical circles. Heller was much praised for his overall work on the epidemiology of sexually transmitted diseases; he rose to the rank of Assistant Surgeon General of the United States, and was named president of the American Venereal Disease Association in 1948–1949.

=== War on cancer ===
Following the successful epidemiological work against syphilis performed by the United States and allied nations in the 1940s, hopes rose that public health work could reduce death rates from cancer. Heller was named director of the National Cancer Institute (NCI) in 1948, serving until 1960. As the director, he led a series of drives for increased U.S. federal government funding for cancer research, a precursor of the so-called "war on cancer". He was also president of the Cancer Public Health Association in 1957. Director Heller worked with the U.S. Congress to create the National Cancer Chemotherapy Service Center in 1955 within NCI. During Heller's tenure, the Institute helped stimulate the development of several second-generation agents of chemotherapy. The Institute and Public Health Association also gathered statistically valid data on the prevalence of cancers within different populations and in different organs of the human body. While cancer death rates continued to rise in the United States in the 1950s, statistical evidence gathered through grant support from NCI during this period led to insights that would bear fruit later, including key supporting evidence for correlations (which had begun to be noted by 1948) between various life-cycle carcinomas and the consumption of tobacco.

In 1960, Heller moved to the private sector, accepting a position as president and chief executive officer at Sloan-Kettering. He was forced into partial retirement after becoming paralyzed by a stroke in May 1963, becoming a consultant to the NCI and to the American Cancer Society. During this period, the Surgeon General of the United States issued a major public health recommendation against the smoking of cigarettes, backed by research performed with the help of Heller's guidance. Heller remained active in his consultancies until completing his retirement in 1976.

During the closing years of this consultancy period, the existence of the Tuskegee Study was unearthed. Major news stories began to be published in 1972. In interviews, Heller defended the research value of doing a long-term clinical study of the progress of untreated/undertreated syphilis in human research subjects. The retiring physician did not express contrition for any aspect of his work. During the following years, the words "Tuskegee study" became shorthand for what was coming to be seen as a serious breach of U.S. medical ethics, but ethicists tended to look at the study protocol rather than the individual biographies of the physicians who had headed the study. When Heller died in May 1989, an obituary published in the New York Times concentrated on his work at NCI and did not mention his role in the Tuskegee Study.

=== Honors, awards and legacy ===
In August 1959, in his capacity as director of the National Cancer Institute, Heller was featured on the front cover of Time magazine. Heller was granted the Wien Award in 1958 and the first World Peace through World Health award of the Eleanor Roosevelt Cancer Foundation in 1961.

Attitudes changed toward the Tuskegee syphilis study that Heller had helped to head. As part of the resolution of a lawsuit, Pollard v. United States, compensation was paid to those patients who had survived the study. In May 1997, President Bill Clinton delivered a formal apology, on behalf of the United States, to the survivors. Five survivors accepted an invitation to the White House to accept the apology.

When interviewers suggested that there had been parallels between the Tuskegee syphilis study and Nazi medical experiments, Heller responded that he saw no such connection.

== See also ==
- List of people on the cover of Time magazine (1950s) - 27 July 1959
