= Jennifer Layden =

American public health official

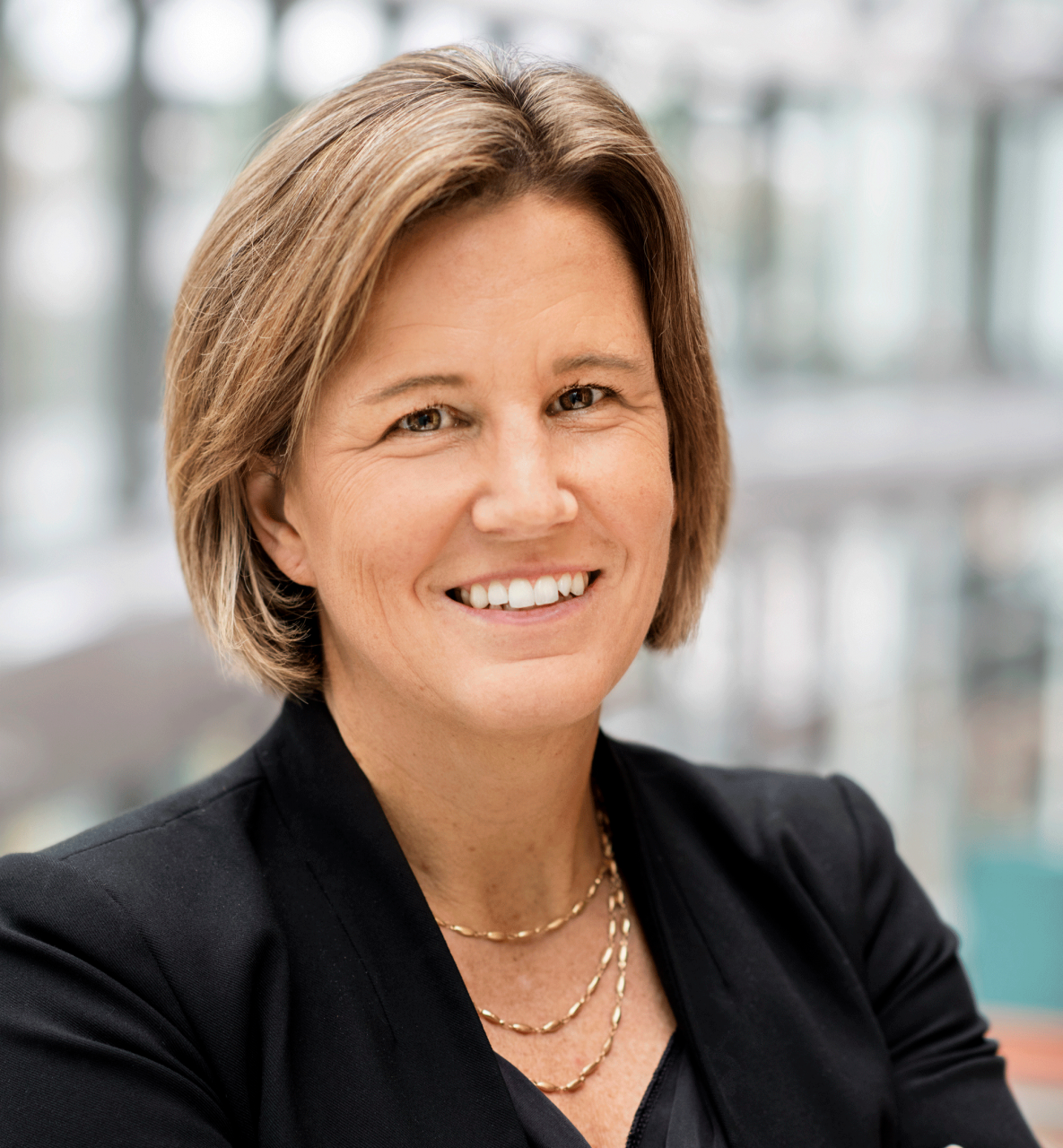
- Layden in 2024
- Education: University of Notre Dame; University of Illinois Chicago
- Scientific career
- Workplaces: Centers for Disease Control and Prevention

Jennifer E. Layden is an American physician, epidemiologist, and public health official. She has worked on public health data modernization, particularly as the director of the Office of Public Health Data, Surveillance, and Technology (OPHDST) at the Centers for Disease Control and Prevention (CDC). At the CDC, she led the agency's Data Modernization Initiative (DMI). Before her federal service, she held senior public health roles in Illinois, including state epidemiologist and chief medical officer (CMO) for the Illinois Department of Public Health. During the onset of the COVID-19 pandemic, she was the deputy commissioner and CMO for the Chicago Department of Public Health. Layden departed the CDC in August 2025.

== Education ==
Layden earned a B.S. from the University of Notre Dame, graduating cum laude in 1996. From 1992 to 1994, she was a member of the varsity women's basketball team. She later attended the University of Illinois Chicago, where she completed a M.D. in 2005 and a Ph.D. in epidemiology in 2005. She completed post-graduate training at the same institution, serving as an intern and resident in medicine from 2005 to 2007 and as a fellow in infectious diseases from 2007 to 2010.

== Career ==
=== Academia ===
Layden began her career in academia. She was an assistant professor of medicine and public health at the University of Illinois Chicago from 2010 to 2012, followed by a position as assistant professor of public health and medicine at Loyola University Chicago from 2012 to 2016. She later became an associate professor of medicine at the University of Illinois Chicago, a role she held from 2016 to 2020.

=== State and local public health ===
In June 2016, Layden was appointed state epidemiologist and chief medical officer (CMO) for the Illinois Department of Public Health (IDPH), where she served until January 2020. Her responsibilities included directing outbreak responses, overseeing disease surveillance efforts, and providing scientific and clinical leadership for the state. During her tenure, she managed public health responses to outbreaks of EVALI, Hepatitis A, and measles.

In January 2020, Layden became the deputy commissioner and CMO for the Chicago Department of Public Health. She was the incident manager for the city's COVID-19 response. At the start of the pandemic, she addressed data management challenges, as many healthcare facilities were reporting cases via fax and Microsoft Excel files. To streamline this process, Layden authored a public health order that defined essential data elements for COVID-19 and mandated their electronic submission in standard formats. In collaboration with Rush University Medical Center, her department established a cloud-based hub to receive this data electronically. She also led the creation of the city's first "Datahub," a platform designed to enable automated electronic data submission from healthcare providers and laboratories. Layden left this position in September 2020.

=== Centers for Disease Control and Prevention ===
Layden joined the Centers for Disease Control and Prevention (CDC) in September 2020, initially in the Office of Science to help lead the agency's COVID-19 response. Shortly after her arrival, she co-led a vaccine task force that oversaw COVID-19 vaccine data and contributed to clinical guidance decisions. Her deployment with the task force lasted from June to October 2021.

Layden held leadership roles at the agency, including associate deputy director to the deputy director for public health science and surveillance from December 2020 to November 2022. She was named acting director of the newly established Office of Public Health Data, Surveillance, and Technology (OPHDST) in November 2022 and was formally appointed director in August 2023.

As director, she led the CDC's Data Modernization Initiative (DMI), which was established in 2019 to address the nation's underfunded and antiquated public health data systems. These systems were often characterized by siloed databases and a reliance on outdated methods like faxes. Layden described public health data funding as following a "boom-and-bust pattern," where funding increases during a crisis and disappears after the threat subsides. She also highlighted how disease-specific funding has led to fragmented data collection, citing an analysis that found jurisdictions had to report data for 11 notifiable diseases to multiple systems. A key component of her work was a plan known as HTI-2, or Health Data, Technology, and Interoperability. She identified sustained funding as the most significant obstacle to modernizing the public health data infrastructure.

On August 27, 2025, it was reported that Layden was departing the CDC after approximately five years with the agency.
