= Lisa C. Richardson =

American physician

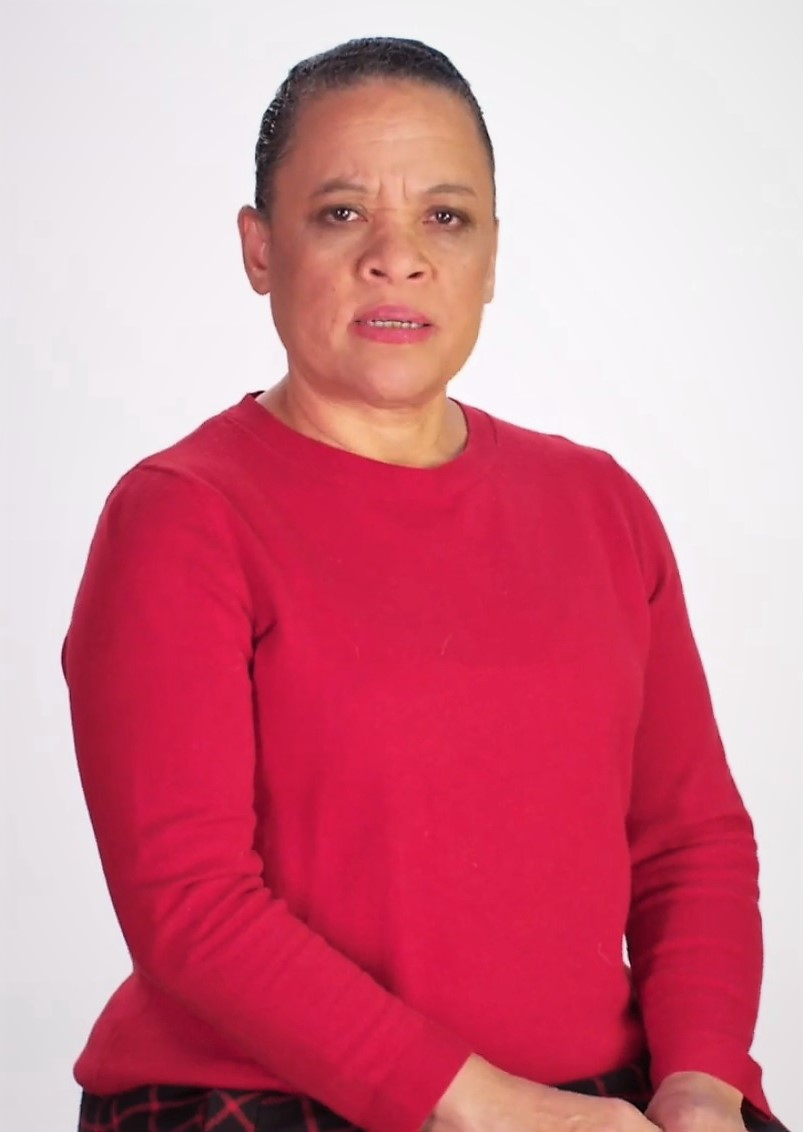
- Richardson in a 2021 Centers for Disease Control video
- Education: University of North Carolina at Chapel Hill
- Scientific career
- Workplaces: University of Florida; Centers for Disease Control and Prevention

Lisa C. Richardson is an American physician who is the Director of CDC Division of Cancer Prevention and Control. She is responsible for the Colorectal Cancer Control Program, the National Breast and Cervical Cancer Early Detection Program, the National Comprehensive Cancer Control Program, and the National Program of Cancer Registries.

== Early life and education ==
Richardson earned her bachelor's and medical degrees at the University of North Carolina at Chapel Hill Whilst at UNC, she was inducted into the Alpha Omega Alpha honor society. She moved to the University of Michigan School of Public Health for graduate studies, where she earned a master's degree in public health. Richardson was an oncology fellow at the University of Florida College of Medicine.

== Research and career ==
In 1997, Richardson joined the Centers for Disease Control and Prevention (CDC). She was appointed medical director of the CDC National Breast and Cervical Cancer Early Detection Programme. The initiative provided cancer screening for low income, uninsured women. In 1998, she was made medical director of the CDC blood disorder division. In this capacity she evaluated HIV and hepatitis infections amongst people with haemophilia. She joined the faculty at the University of Florida in 2000, where she spent four years before returning to the CDC. She was appointed to the Division of Cancer Prevention and Control in 2010, where she oversees a $380 million annual budget.

== Selected publications ==
- Gery P. Guy; Cheryll C. Thomas; Trevor Thompson; Meg Watson; Greta M Massetti; Lisa C. Richardson; Centers for Disease Control and Prevention (CDC) (1 June 2015). "Vital signs: melanoma incidence and mortality trends and projections - United States, 1982-2030". Morbidity and Mortality Weekly Report. 64 (21): 591–596. ISSN 0149-2195. PMC 4584771. PMID 26042651. Wikidata Q34479259.
- Arica White; Trevor D Thompson; Mary C White; Susan A Sabatino; Janet de Moor; Paul V Doria-Rose; Ann M Geiger; Lisa C Richardson (3 March 2017). "Cancer Screening Test Use - United States, 2015". Morbidity and Mortality Weekly Report. 66 (8): 201–206. doi:10.15585/mmwr.mm6608a1. ISSN 0149-2195. PMC 5657895. PMID 28253225. Wikidata Q38933266.
- Lisa C Richardson; Lori A Pollack (1 January 2005). "Therapy insight: Influence of type 2 diabetes on the development, treatment and outcomes of cancer". Nature Clinical Practice Oncology. 2 (1): 48–53. doi:10.1038/ncponc0062. ISSN 1743-4254. PMID 16264856. Wikidata Q36303910.
