= Jennifer Shuford =

- Shuford in 2026
- Education: Colorado College; University of Texas Southwestern Medical Center; Harvard University
- Children: 2
- Scientific career
- Fields: Infectious diseases, public health, epidemiology
- Workplaces: Texas Department of State Health Services; Centers for Disease Control and Prevention

Jennifer A. Shuford is an American infectious disease physician serving as the deputy director and chief medical officer of the Centers for Disease Control and Prevention since 2026. She was previously commissioner of the Texas Department of State Health Services from 2022 to 2026. Shuford oversaw its response to the 2025 Southwest United States measles outbreak and was the chief state epidemiologist during the COVID-19 pandemic in Texas.

== Education ==
Shuford's mother was a nurse and her father a pharmaceutical sales representative. Her family moved to Arlington, Texas when she was eight years old.

Shuford earned a B.A. in chemistry at Colorado College. She received a M.D. from the University of Texas Southwestern Medical Center in 1999. She completed an internal medicine residency at Texas Health Presbyterian Hospital Dallas, where Shuford served as chief resident. She completed an infectious diseases fellowship at the Mayo Clinic, and earned a M.P.H. from the Harvard T.H. Chan School of Public Health. She is board-certified in internal medicine and infectious diseases.

== Career ==
Shuford worked as an infectious disease physician in Austin, Texas. In 2017, she joined the Texas Department of State Health Services where she was promoted to chief state epidemiologist in December 2020 during the COVID-19 pandemic. During the pandemic, she led efforts supporting data sharing in real time.

Following the retirement of John Hellerstedt in the fall of 2022, Shuford became the interim commissioner. On December 27, 2022, she was named permanently to the role. Shulford oversaw the department's response to the 2025 Southwest United States measles outbreak. She was a faculty member on the department's preventative medicine and public health residency program.

In April 2026, Shuford was among the Centers for Disease Control and Prevention (CDC) leadership team announced by Donald Trump. She joined the CDC served as its deputy director and chief medical officer in June. In October, she announced her upcoming resignation to spend more time with her family. Satish Pillai is projected to succeed Shuford on an interim basis on November 11.

== Personal life ==
Shuford is married and has two children.
