= TEPHINET =

Training program utilized by the Center for Disease Control (1997-present)

Training Programs in Epidemiology and Public Health Interventions Network (TEPHINET)
- Founded: 1997
- Merger of: The Task Force for Global Health
- Type: Nonprofit
- Headquarters: Atlanta, GA

Training Programs in Epidemiology and Public Health Interventions Network (TEPHINET) is a global professional network of field epidemiology training programs (FETPs). As of August 2019, TEPHINET comprises 71 member FETPs working across more than 100 countries. TEPHINET's mission is to empower and mobilize a competent field epidemiology workforce to serve all people through standardized training, experiential learning, training program quality improvement, mentoring, and knowledge exchanges in order to connect epidemiologists better, faster, and with quality across the globe. As a network, TEPHINET member programs share technical expertise for improving disease surveillance, public health emergency response, and health promotion programs and collaborate with multinational outbreak response teams sponsored by the World Health Organization and other organizations.

== Work ==
TEPHINET serves as a global network of professionals who can be recruited during public health emergencies. For example, during the 2014 Ebola outbreak in West Africa, TEPHINET recruited senior epidemiologists who had the language skills and field epidemiology experience to aid in the crisis. In collaboration with the CDC, TEPHINET played an important role in the recruitment of mentors and logistical assistance.
