= Consolidated Appropriations Act, 2012 =

- Long title: Making appropriations for military construction, the Department of Veterans Affairs, and related agencies for the fiscal year ending September 30, 2012, and for other purposes
- Enacted by: the 112th United States Congress

Legislative history
- Introduced in the House by Rep. John Culberson [R-TX7] on May 31, 2011; Committee consideration by House Appropriations, Senate Appropriations; Passed the House on Jun 13, 2011 (409/1); Passed the House on Jun 14, 2011 (Passed 411/5) with amendment; Senate agreed to House amendment on Jul 20, 2011 (97/2) with further amendment; House agreed to Senate amendment on Dec 16, 2011 (296/121)

The Consolidated Appropriations Act, 2012 (Pub. L. 112–74 (text) (PDF), H.R. 2055, 125 Stat. 785, enacted December 23, 2011) is an act passed by the 112th United States Congress.

== Provisions ==
The act provided $72.53 billion in non-emergency, discretionary budget authority for FY 2012, a decrease of $1.2 billion from FY 2011 levels. Funding for Department of Veterans Affairs (VA) programs in FY 2012 included $69.5 billion in mandatory spending, equal to the president's request. The act provided $52.5 billion in advance appropriations for VA medical accounts in FY 2013, an increase of $1.9 billion (4 percent) over the advance appropriations for FY 2012. Including $69.5—billion in mandatory spending (which does not count against the subcommittee's allocation), the act provided $142 billion in budget authority for FY 2012 and contributed to an overall level of discretionary budget authority of $1.019 trillion for FY 2012 (a reduction of $30.3 billion from FY 2011).

=== Department of Defense and military construction ===
==== Department of Defense construction ====
The act appropriated $14 billion for Department of Defense (DoD) military construction, family housing and base realignment, a decrease of $4.6 billion (16 percent) from FY 2011. The funding level was $752 million (five percent below the president's request). According to the Appropriations Committee, the act provided funding for 397 military construction projects in the budget request.

==== Military family housing ====
The act provided $1.65 billion for family-housing maintenance and construction, a decrease of $128 million (seven percent) from FY 2011 and equal to the president's request. According to the committee, the act provided $373 million for the construction of family housing.

==== NATO Security Investment Program ====
The act provided $273 million for the North Atlantic Treaty Organization (NATO) Security Investment Program, an increase of $14 million (five percent) from FY 2011 and equal to the president's request. The program finances installations and facilities needed to support the roles of the two NATO Strategic Commands, including communications and information systems, radar, military headquarters, airfields, fuel pipelines and storage and harbors.

==== Base realignment and closure (BRAC) ====
The act provided $582 million for the re-stationing of overseas U.S. military personnel in the United States and base closures, a decrease of $1.9 billion (76 percent) from FY 2011 and equal to the president's budget request.

=== Department of Veterans Affairs ===
==== Veterans Benefits Administration ====
The act included a total (mandatory and discretionary) funding level of $69.6 billion for the Veterans Benefits Administration, an increase of $5.1 billion (eight percent) over FY 2011 and equal to the president's request. Most of the administration's funds are provided through mandatory spending for compensation, pensions and other benefits established in prior legislation.

Funding provided to the Veterans’ Benefits Administration includes $11 billion in readjustment benefits, which finances the education and training of veterans and service members initially entering active duty on or after July 1, 1985. This funding was an increase of $615 million (six percent) from FY 2011.

==== Veterans Health Administration ====
The act provided $53 billion for the Veterans Health Administration, an increase of $1.9 billion (four percent) from FY 2011 and equal to the president's request. Funding for Veterans Health Administration medical services comes from advance appropriations in previous years. Advance appropriations from previous funding measures for the VA Administration for FY 2012 included $39.6 billion for medical services, $5.5 billion for medical-support compliance and $5.4 billion for medical facilities. The act also contained $52.5 billion in advance appropriations to finance these programs in FY 2013.

==== Information technology ====
The act provided $3 billion for VA information-technology needs at medical facilities, a decrease of $121 million from FY 2011 and $136 million from the president's request.

==== Operating expenses ====
The act provided $2.44 billion for VA operating expenses (a decrease of $24 million from the president's request), dividing operating expenses into two accounts. The administration's budget request proposed that funding for the administrative expenses associated with the Veterans Benefits Administration and department-wide offices be included in a single appropriation account. The committee recommendation included funding for these functions in two separate accounts: general operating expenses for the Veterans Benefits Administration and general administration.

==== VA construction ====
The act provided $590 million for major VA construction projects, a decrease of $561 million (48 percent) from FY 2011. It also provided $475 million for other VA construction projects, a decrease of $75 million (14 percent) from the president's budget request.

==== VA Inspector General ====
The act provided $109 million for the Department of Veterans Affairs Office of the Inspector General, the same amount as the previous year and identical to the president's request.

==== Advance appropriations ====
The act provided $52.5 billion in advance appropriations for the Veterans Health Administration for medical services, support and facilities.

=== Related agencies ===
==== American Battle Monuments Commission ====
The American Battle Monuments Commission, responsible for operating and supporting U.S. military monuments and cemeteries around the world, was funded at $77 million (a decrease of $7 million—eight percent—from FY 2011 and the same as the president's budget request.

==== Army cemetery expenses ====
The act provided $46 million for the operation of Arlington National Cemetery, $1 million more than the previous year.

==== Armed Forces Retirement Home ====
The act provided $68 million for the Armed Forces Retirement Home Trust Fund, $3 million below the previous year's level.

=== Additional provisions ===
==== Use of funds ====
The act prohibited funds from being made available to acquire land, provide for site preparation or install utilities for family housing unless it was made available in appropriations for military construction.

==== Steel procurement ====
The act prohibited the procurement of steel, unless U.S. producers and manufacturers were able to compete.

==== Project labor agreements ====
The act prohibited the use of funds for enforcement of Executive Order 13502, which encourages executive agencies to consider requiring the use of project labor agreements in connection with large-scale construction projects.

==== E-Verify ====
Included was a requirement that contractors comply with the E-Verify requirements of Executive Order 12989. E-Verify is an Internet-based system allowing businesses to determine the eligibility of their employees to work in the United States.

==== Guantanamo Bay detainees ====
The act prohibited funding for the construction or renovation of any facility in the continental United States for housing any individual detained at Guantanamo Bay detention camp, Cuba.

== Costs ==
According to the Congressional Budget Office, the act provided $72.535 billion in discretionary budget authority for programs funded through the military construction and veterans affairs appropriations bill for fiscal year 2012.

== Public perception ==
The act attracted public attention in April 2013 in a case involving a United Nations whistleblower. James Wasserstrom was awarded $65,000 of his $3.2 million suit after a long legal battle with the UN in which he asserted that he was not protected from retaliation. The act is notable for ending the ban on slaughtering horses for meat and its "Weldon Amendment": "a physician or other health care professional, a hospital, a provider-sponsored organization, a health maintenance organization, a health insurance plan, or any other kind of health care facility” may refuse abortions, counseling, or referrals, even in cases of rape, incest, or medical emergency".

It has been questioned by the United States Postal Service, since its wording affects the service's decision whether or not to eliminate Saturday mail delivery. The act's continued appropriations assumed six-day delivery.
