= Lisa Richardson (journalist) =

American journalist

Lisa Richardson is an American journalist. She has been on staff as an editorial writer and reporter for the Los Angeles Times since 1992, writing about race, culture, and class in Los Angeles. Since 2022, she has served on the board of directors of the Los Angeles Master Chorale. Richardson, who is African-American, is a member of the United Daughters of the Confederacy and has written articles supporting the Removal of Confederate monuments and memorials.

== Early life and education ==
Richardson is originally from Boston, Massachusetts. She is the great-great-granddaughter of Mary Ellen Fulton, the niece of the wife of John Wayles, the father-in-law of Thomas Jefferson. Her great-great-great-grandfather, Jeremiah H. Dial, served in the 31st Arkansas Infantry Regiment of the Confederate States Army during the American Civil War and was wounded in December 1862 at the Battle of Stones River. Her great-great-great-grandmother, Lavinia Dulton, was born enslaved but died a freedwoman.

Richardson earned a Bachelor of Arts in English and English literature from Dartmouth College. She also studied Spanish politics, literature, and art at the University of Granada and the University of Salamanca.

== Career ==
In 1992, Richardson joined the staff of the Los Angeles Times as a reporter. She began in the South Bay bureau in Torrance, then worked at the paper's Orange County edition before joining the Metro staff as an editorial writer. She has reported on crime, immigration, urban affairs, and Latin America at the newspaper. As an editorial writer, Richardson has written about race, culture, and class in Los Angeles.

In December 2022, Richardson was appointed to the board of directors of the Los Angeles Master Chorale. She is a member of the United Daughters of the Confederacy. Although a member of the United Daughters of the Confederacy, which historically worked to preserve Confederate monuments and promote the Lost Cause narrative, Richardson advocates for the Removal of Confederate monuments and memorials and moving them into museums instead of keeping them as monuments in public places. She has written in the Los Angeles Times and The Delaware Gazette about Confederate monuments being used to promote white supremacy and their connection to domestic terrorism.

== Personal life ==
Richardson resides in Miracle Mile, Los Angeles.
