= Field epidemiology =

Application of epidemiologic methods for unexpected health problems when time-restricted

Field epidemiology as part of hurricane response measures

Field Epidemiology is the application of epidemiologic methods to unexpected health problems when a rapid on-site investigation is necessary for timely intervention. A more expansive definition is: The practice of Epidemiology in the field. Work is done in communities often as a public health service and as part of government or a closely allied institution. Field epidemiology is how epidemics and outbreaks are investigated, and is used to implement measures to protect and improve the health of the public. Field epidemiologists must deal with unexpected, sometimes urgent problems that demand immediate solution. Its methods are designed to answer specific epidemiologic questions in order to plan, implement, and/or evaluate public health interventions. These studies consider the needs of those who will use the results. The task of a field epidemiologist is not complete until the results of a study have been clearly communicated in a timely manner to those who need to know, and an intervention made to improve the health of the people.

Field Epidemiology Training Programs (FETPs) are two-year applied public health training programs modeled after the U.S. Centers for Disease Control and Prevention's (CDC) Epidemic Intelligence Service (EIS). FETPs are established within host country ministries of health to enhance the epidemiologic capacity of the public health workforce and increase the use of science and data to appropriately respond to public health threats. By developing the skills of the workers and reinforcing the health systems in which they work, FETPs also help countries to meet their core capacity requirements for surveillance and response under the revised International Health Regulations (IHR, 2005).

The guiding principle of the FETP training model is “learning through doing,” a concept that is analogous to a medical residency (in which physicians acquire on-the-job experience by learning and practicing the necessary skills to become capable clinicians); many FETP programs are however open to a wide range of health professional backgrounds, not only physicians. FETP trainees, or “residents,” spend approximately 25 percent of their time in the classroom, learning the principles of epidemiology, disease surveillance, outbreak investigation, and biostatistics. The other 75 percent of their time is spent in field placements, where residents "learn by doing," by participating in outbreak investigations, helping to establish and evaluate disease surveillance systems, designing and conducting studies on problems of public health concern in their country, and training other healthcare workers. Field work is typically conducted under the supervision and guidance of an experienced mentor.

FETP residents have been involved in initiatives to prevent and control infectious diseases of global health importance, including polio, cholera, tuberculosis, HIV, malaria, and emerging infectious diseases of animal origin (e.g., SARS, Nipah virus, and avian influenza). Many residents have also worked to reduce the burden of non-communicable diseases, such as heart disease, cancer, and diabetes, or environmental or occupational health problems.

Since launching the Epidemic Intelligence Service by the US Centers for Disease Control and Prevention in 1951, the development of field epidemiology has been promoted internationally and globally. The first FETP outside of the United States was established by Canada in 1975. In 1980, the government of Thailand requested CDC's assistance to establish its own program, with funding initially contributed by the United States Agency for International Development (USAID). Since then, CDC has helped to establish FETPs in 41 countries worldwide, which have produced more than 2,500 graduates from 61 countries. Over 80% of residents stay in their home countries, and many become leaders within their public health system.

== FETP Networks ==
Many of the countries which participate in an FETP collaborate with the Training Programs in Epidemiology and Public Health Interventions Network (TEPHINET), a global network of Field and Applied Epidemiology Training Programs, to share resources and best practices. Regional FETP networks also exist, including: the African Field Epidemiology Network (AFENET), the Eastern Mediterranean Public Health Network (EMPHNET), RedSur (the network of Latin American FETPs), and the South Asia Field Epidemiology and Technology Network (SAFETYNET).

The European Centre for Disease Prevention and Control (ECDC) has created the European Programme for Intervention Epidemiology Training (EPIET) in 1995. Its purpose was to create a network of highly trained field epidemiologists in the European Union, thereby strengthening the public health epidemiology workforce at EU Member States and EEA level. Current EPIET alumni are providing expertise in response activities and strengthening capacity for communicable disease surveillance and control inside and beyond the EU. In 2006 EPIET was integrated into the core activities of ECDC. The European Public Health Microbiology Training Programme (EUPHEM) was initiated by ECDC in 2008. The EUPHEM program a unique program. The objective of the public health microbiology path (EUPHEM) is to provide state-of-the-art training in public health microbiology enabling its fellows to apply microbiological and epidemiological methods to a wide range of public health problems in Europe.

In 2016, EPIET and EUPHEM became the ECDC Fellowship Programme, consolidating in this way the alignment of administrative processes and core curricular aspects.

EPIET has a very active alumni network (the EPIET Alumni Network; EAN) that was created in 2000 to help develop and maintain a network of European public health epidemiologists that have participated in the European Programme for Intervention Epidemiology Training (EPIET); it now also includes alumni from the European Programme for Public Health Microbiology Training (EUPHEM) and other European Field Epidemiology Training Programmes (FETP). As well as alumni of training programmes, the EAN also has some ‘external’ members who, through their work, meet similar objectives to the EAN. As the regular member surveys show, "having a network of professionals that know each other, speak the same 'language', and can easily access each other's expertise, represents an important resource for European and global public health, which should be nurtured by encouraging more collaborations devoted to professional development."
