= National Center for Injury Prevention and Control =

The U.S. Centers for Disease Control and Prevention's National Center for Injury Prevention and Control's mission is to provide leadership in preventing and controlling injuries, i.e., reducing the incidence, severity, and adverse outcomes of injury, the leading cause of death for those aged 1 – 44.

The Center has three branches: the Division of Acute Care, Rehabilitation Research, and Disability Prevention; the Division of Unintentional Injury Prevention; and the Division of Violence Prevention.

== History ==
A 1985 National Research Council report entitled Injury in America recommended that United States Congress establish a new program at the CDC to address the problem of injury. Initially the program was supported with funds from the United States Department of Transportation. In 1990 Congress passed the Injury Control Act which authorized the program within the CDC, and in 1992, the CDC formally established the Center.

In the second Trump administration, the 2025 federal mass layoffs effectively eliminated several programs by firing all their employees. That included the entire teams working on gun violence prevention, drowning prevention, transportation safety, violence prevention, older adult fall prevention, and domestic violence. As of September 2025, staff remained working on overdoses, suicide, intimate partner violence, and adverse childhood experiences.
