= Alexander Langmuir =

American epidemiologist (1910–1993)

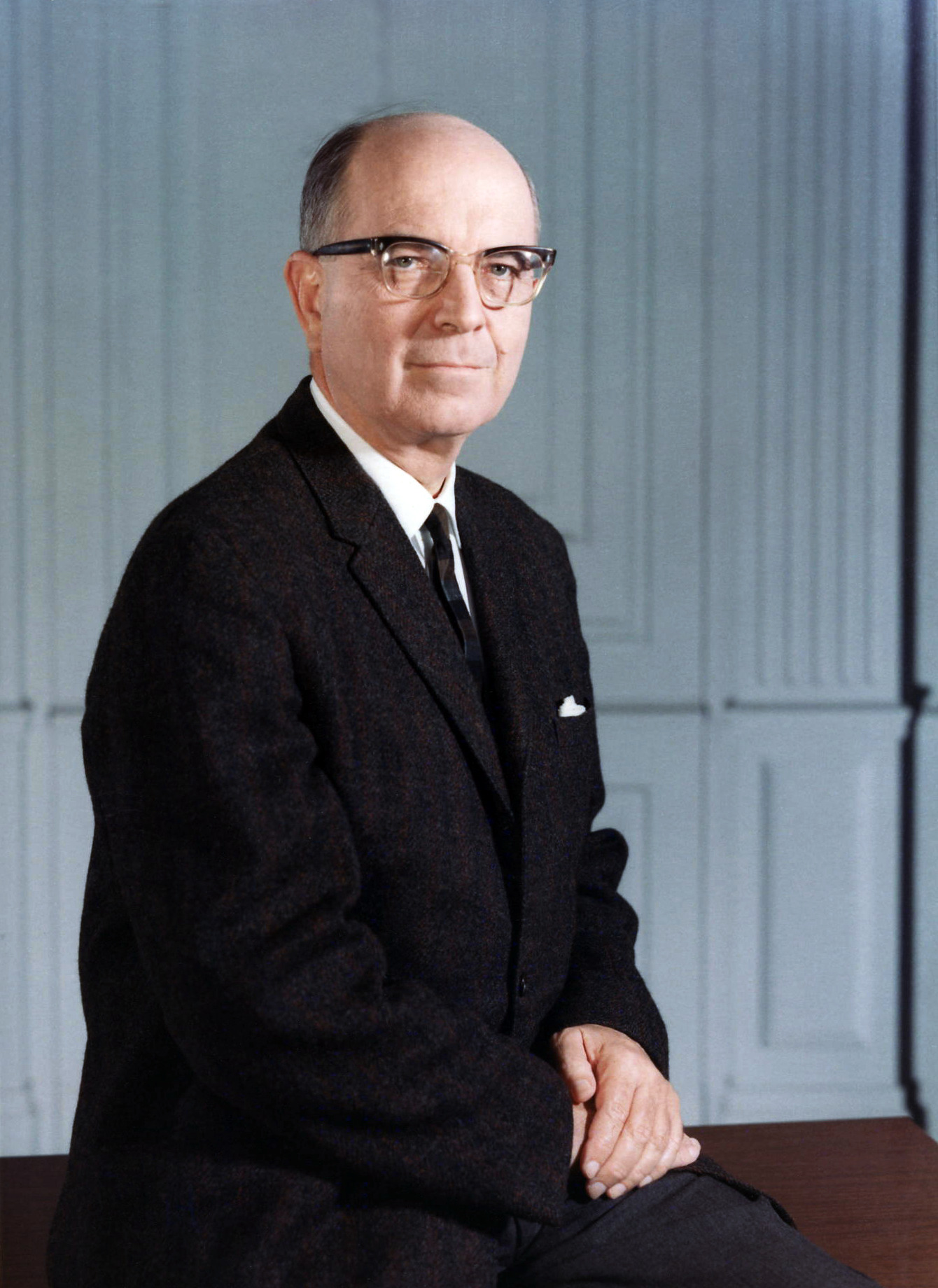
- Born: September 12, 1910; Santa Monica, California, US
- Died: November 22, 1993 (aged 83); Baltimore, Maryland, US
- Education: Harvard University (AB); Cornell University (MD); Johns Hopkins University (MPH)
- Known for: Epidemic Intelligence Service
- Spouses: Sarah Ann Harper (m. 1940; died 1969) Leona Baumgartner (m. 1970; died 1991)
- Children: 5
- Awards: Bronfman Prize for Public Health Achievement (1965); James D. Bruce Memorial Award (1973); Edward Jenner Medal (1979)
- Scientific career
- Fields: Epidemiology
- Workplaces: Centers for Disease Control and Prevention
- Alexander Langmuir's voice Alexander Langmuir discussing his inspiration to pursue public health Recorded June 2, 1979

Alexander Duncan Langmuir (/ˈlæŋmjʊər/; September 12, 1910 – November 22, 1993) was an American epidemiologist who served as Chief Epidemiologist of the Centers for Disease Control and Prevention (CDC) from 1949 to 1970, developing the Epidemic Intelligence Service (EIS) as a training program for epidemiologists.

During his tenure, Langmuir broadened the CDC's scope to include the epidemiology of non-communicable diseases, environmental health, and family planning. Additionally, Langmuir increased coordination between the CDC and state and territorial epidemiologists.

Langmuir has been praised for transferring publication of the Morbidity and Mortality Weekly Report (MMWR) to the CDC, ushering in plain English explanations of ongoing health crises that were useful for both scientists and members of the public.

== Early life and education ==
Langmuir was born on September 12, 1910, in Santa Monica, California, to New York Life Insurance Company President Charles H. Langmuir and Edith Ruggles Langmuir as the third of five children. From 1921 onward, he was raised in Englewood, New Jersey, with his brothers Peter, Charles, and David and sister Edith. As President of the Harvard Liberal Club, Langmuir led the university's delegation to the 1931 Conference of International Student Service at Mount Holyoke College, denouncing American college students for their detachment from politics, which he blamed for the poor economic policies that led to the ongoing Great Depression.

In March 1932, Langmuir served on the student honorary board of a Model League of Nations conference with 28 New England universities, overseeing discussions of post-World War One disarmament, conflicts over the Polish Corridor, and the Second Sino-Japanese War. He later credited these political simulations as preparation for his work in the federal government.

Langmuir graduated from Harvard College with a Bachelor of Arts in Physics in 1931. Despite his initial interest in following his Nobel Prize-winning uncle, Irving Langmuir, by specializing in surface science, Langmuir found advanced mathematics too difficult, leading him to the biomedical statistics of epidemiology.

After receiving his Doctor of Medicine from Cornell University Medical College in 1935, he completed a two-year residency in internal medicine at Boston City Hospital. His first paper was published in The New England Journal of Medicine in 1934, associating a patient's present condition with their stage of tuberculosis upon admission, duration of sanatorium treatment, and extent of Mycobacterium tuberculosis bacterial colonization in their sputum.

While attending medical school, Langmuir met with Massachusetts Commissioner of Health George Hoyt Bigelow, who encouraged him to pursue public health by describing the epidemiology behind an investigation of milk contamination in Lee, Massachusetts, that resulted in cases of sore throats and scarlet fever. After working as a medical consultant on pneumonia control for the New York State Department of Health from 1937 to 1939, Langmuir pursued a Master in Public Health from the Johns Hopkins University School of Hygiene and Public Health, graduating in 1940. Learning from Biostatistics Chair Lowell Reed and Epidemiology Chair Wade Hampton Frost, Langmuir would later adapt their work by introducing compartmental models to the CDC to predict the growth of epidemics and allocate vaccine doses.

== Career ==
=== Early work ===
From 1940 to 1941, Langmuir served as Assistant District Health Officer of the New York State Institute of Health. On January 10, 1941, the Health Commissioner of Westchester County, New York, George H. Ramsey, appointed Langmuir as Deputy Health Commissioner, tasking him with opening a new office in Peekskill to serve the northern portion of the county.

During a visit to Irving Langmuir's home to discuss surface chemistry, John Holmes Dingle admired Alexander Langmuir's papers studying the spread of polio in Westchester County. When Dingle was appointed to lead the US Army's Commission on Acute Respiratory Diseases during World War II, he recruited Alexander Langmuir to serve at Fort Bragg in North Carolina from 1942 to 1946.

In 1946, Langmuir began working as an Associate Professor of Epidemiology at the Johns Hopkins School of Hygiene and Public Health, but he quickly grew disillusioned with academia.

==== Consideration for New York City Health Commissioner ====
After New York City Health Commissioner Ernest Lyman Stebbins announced his intent to leave the position and become Director of the Johns Hopkins University School of Hygiene and Public Health in July 1946, Mayor William O'Dwyer tasked a six-person commission led by Surgeon General Thomas Parran with nominating potential replacements. However, the February 1946 New York City tugboat strike led Stebbins to controversially close all businesses and schools to reserve fuel for public utilities, hospitals, and emergency responders. Frustrated with backlash to the 18-hour shutdown, O'Dwyer ignored all eight recommendations proposed on March 1, 1946, including Langmuir, and appointed New York City Hospital Commissioner Edward M. Bernecker. Despite Bernecker lacking the public health experience that the New York City Charter requires for the position, O'Dwyer figured that he could control Bernecker more than outsiders like Langmuir, who was then-stationed at Fort Bragg in North Carolina.

=== Centers for Disease Control and Prevention ===
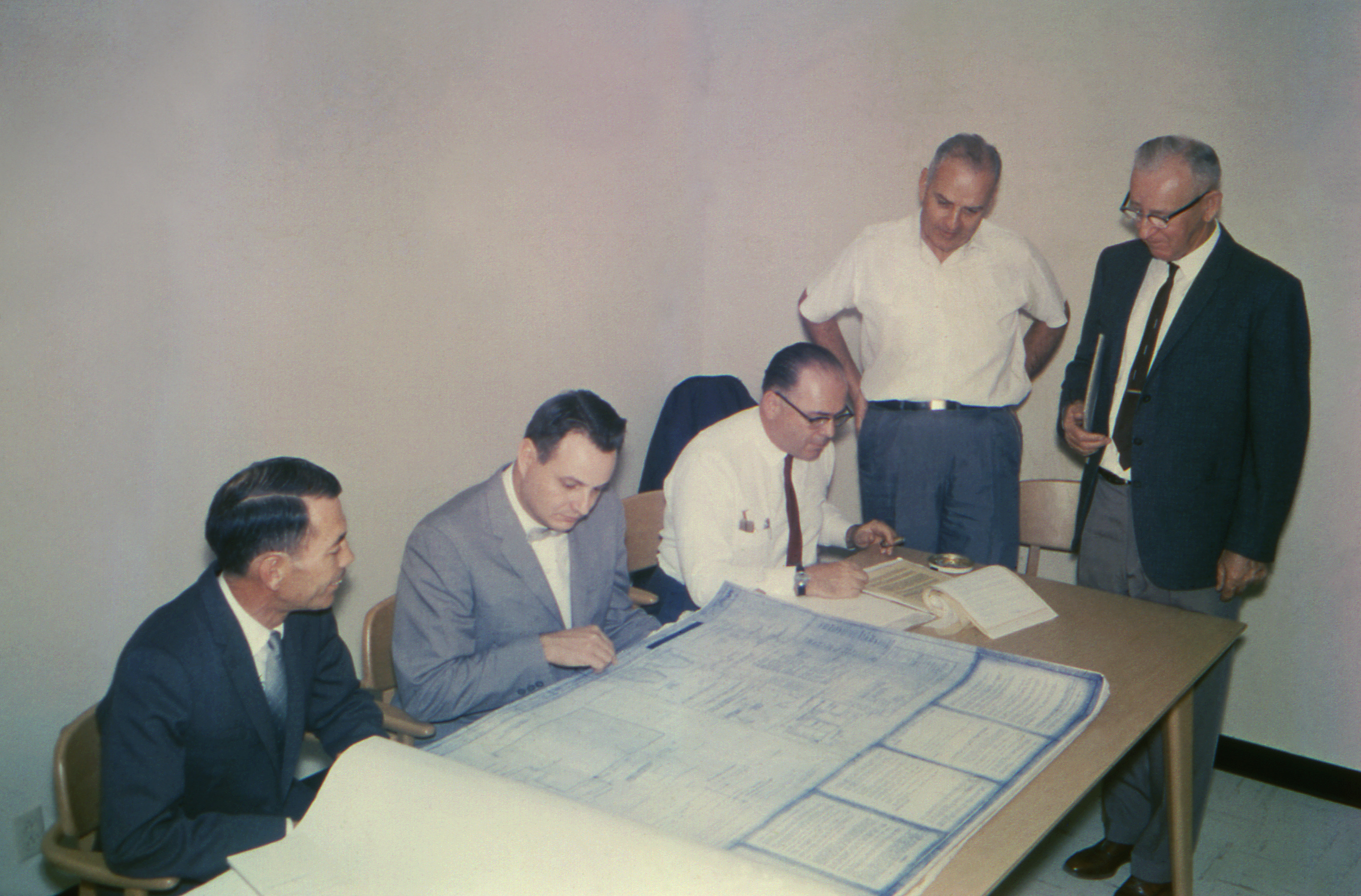
1962 photo of Tom D. Y. Chin, Melvin Goodwin, and Langmuir reviewing blueprints for the CDC's field station in Phoenix, Arizona, designated for studying vector-borne disease

Recruited by Justin M. Andrews in 1949, Langmuir became Chief Epidemiologist of the Communicable Disease Center in Atlanta, Georgia, a position he held until 1970. Widening the organization's focus to include the epidemiology of non-communicable diseases like birth defects and cancer, Langmuir's efforts led to the institution's 1980 renaming as the Centers for Disease Control and Prevention (CDC). Additionally, Langmuir's efforts to include environmental health under the CDC's purview led to the 1983 creation of the Agency for Toxic Substances and Disease Registry. During this period, Langmuir also worked as a clinical professor of preventative medicine and community health at Emory University.

During the 1957–1958 influenza pandemic, the Association of State and Territorial Health Officials convinced the US Public Health Service (USPHS) to appoint Langmuir to a 14-member technical advisory group that coordinated research between the USPHS and US Department of Defense. In this role, Langmuir instituted a system of 108 US cities reporting their deaths by cause to the CDC on a weekly basis, which is still utilized for tracking influenza-like illness.

In March 1960, Surgeon General Leroy Edgar Burney appointed Langmuir, Albert Sabin, Assistant Surgeon General David E. Price, and NIH Division of Biologics Control Director Roderick Murray to attend a May 1960 conference with Soviet scientists on improving Sabin's live attenuated polio vaccine. However, the US Department of State blocked the trip over the attendance of Chinese and East German scientists, claiming that the presence of American scientists would lend undue prestige to Communist delegations.

In September 1960, Langmuir and William H. Stewart successfully convinced the US Department of Health and Human Services to transfer publication of the Morbidity and Mortality Weekly Report (MMWR) from the National Office of Vital Statistics to the CDC, ensuring that epidemiologic surveillance would be directly reported to the public. Langmuir's 1967 appointment of Michael B. Gregg as editor-in-chief of the MMWR has been retrospectively praised for ushering in plain English explanations.

In 1961, the drug thalidomide, popular as a morning sickness treatment among pregnant European women, was found to cause birth defects and miscarriages. While the thalidomide scandal minimally affected the United States because the Food and Drug Administration (FDA) rejected the drug for failure to test its safety among pregnant women, the incident led Langmuir to support the 1967 creation of the Metropolitan Atlanta Congenital Defects Program (MACDP). Tracking birth defects among infants and children born in Atlanta, the MACDP has identified other cases of drug toxicity, such as the association between exposure to the antidepressant venlafaxine during later stages of pregnancy and birth defects.

At the 1968 22nd World Health Assembly held in Boston, Massachusetts, Langmuir and Karel Raška of Czechoslovakia organized the technical discussions around the theme of "National and Global Surveillance" coordinated by the World Health Organization.

==== Epidemic Intelligence Service ====
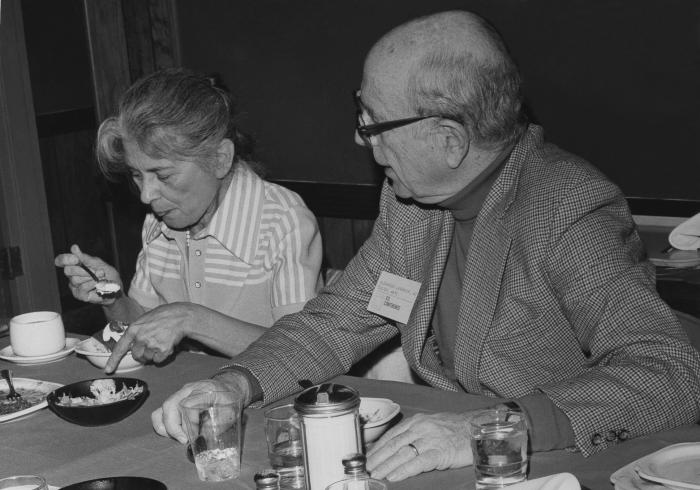
Ida Sherwood and Langmuir during an EIS luncheon

Critical of significant variation in the data collection and reporting of doctors and state health officials regarding malaria cases, Langmuir started the Epidemic Intelligence Service (EIS) in 1951 to train doctors, veterinarians, statisticians, and other health workers in epidemiology. The EIS logo depicts a shoe with a hole, referencing Langmuir's philosophy of "shoe-leather epidemiology", in which "disease detectives" conduct on-site fieldwork to understand emerging infectious disease outbreaks, rather than passively relying on local health authorities to report information. The CDC ultimately determined that doctors in the southeastern United States were incorrectly attributing unexplained fevers to malaria without differential diagnosis.

Inspired by Charles V. Chapin's work convincing Rhode Island public health officials to accept germ theory over miasma theory, Langmuir initially assumed all disease was transmitted through direct contact, rather than airborne transmission. During his time with the Commission on Acute Respiratory Diseases at Fort Bragg, Langmuir found that ultraviolet germicidal irradiation did not significantly reduce the transmission of acute respiratory illnesses between recruits.

However, once the US biological weapons program at Fort Detrick had demonstrated airborne transmission of many pathogens, Langmuir used the threat of potential biological warfare during the Korean War to justify the training of epidemiologists through the Epidemic Intelligence Service. In 1976, virologist Ho Wang Lee identified that the Korean hemorrhagic fever reported by American soldiers was actually due to endemic Hantaan orthohantavirus. During the 2001 anthrax attacks, EIS officers tracked many cases to mailed envelopes containing Bacillus anthracis spores.

After EIS veterinarians had convincingly traced salmonellosis cases to infected poultry and psittacosis cases to infected turkeys during the 1950s, Langmuir helped formulate the Poultry Products Inspection Act of 1957, which requires the US Department of Agriculture's Food Safety and Inspection Service to inspect all domesticated birds when slaughtered and processed into products for human consumption.

In January 1976, soldiers at Fort Dix, New Jersey, contracted swine influenza A/H1N1, prompting comparisons to the 1918–1920 flu pandemic that originated from Camp Funston, Kansas. By September 1976, the federal government had begun distributing vaccines to suppress this 1976 swine flu outbreak, but reports of Guillain–Barré syndrome among recipients led to the vaccine's rollout being permanently halted in December 1976. As the US Department of Justice evaluated over 4,000 claims of injury, Langmuir led the EIS in studying the mechanisms by which vaccination can trigger this autoimmune condition to establish clinical case criteria and identify genuine instances of Guillain–Barré syndrome.

==== Cutter Incident ====
In April 1955, Cutter Laboratories began distributing Jonas Salk's polio vaccine containing inactive poliovirus, but many of the child recipients developed polio two weeks afterward, resulting in 51 cases of permanent paralysis and five deaths. Tasked with identifying the outbreak's source by Surgeon General Leonard A. Scheele, Langmuir ordered each state to designate a public health officer that would report all cases of polio to conduct a case-control study, ultimately finding that two lots of Cutter Laboratories' vaccine had been contaminated with live poliovirus. Following resumed distribution of the Salk polio vaccine using other suppliers, the Pan American Health Organization declared the eradication of wild poliovirus in 1994.

In 1963, Langmuir and Neal Nathanson, who Langmuir had appointed to lead the CDC's Polio Surveillance Unit (PSU), published internal documents on the Cutter incident. Controversially, Langmuir refused to include documents showing that one lot of Wyeth's formulation of the Salk polio vaccine had also been contaminated with live poliovirus, seeking to maintain the public's confidence in polio vaccination. During the prior year, Langmuir had similarly shielded Albert Sabin's polio vaccine from public scrutiny, despite its association with polio cases among recipients in Nebraska and Oregon.

==== Family planning ====
Inspired by Margaret Sanger's guest lecture to the Harvard Liberal Club, Langmuir promoted family planning through epidemiologic studies of abortion and birth control, and he joined the Planned Parenthood of Atlanta's Board of Directors in 1965. In 1962, the Population Council tried recruiting Langmuir to create a public health approach to population control, but he chose to instead pursue this goal within the CDC by acquiring funding from the National Institute of Child Health and Human Development's Center for Population Research. Under his tenure, the CDC frequently collaborated with the Guttmacher Institute to evaluate family planning programs and the US Agency for International Development to survey international attitudes toward family planning.

Many EIS officers focused on improving contraceptive safety, such as identifying that intrauterine devices (IUDs) made with polyurethane reduced the risk of uterine perforation, as compared to IUDs made with polypropylene. During the 1970s, EIS officers identified that the Dalkon Shield's tail string allowed bacteria to pass from the cervix to the uterus, resulting in an elevated risk for pelvic inflammatory disease and septic abortion. The EIS' findings led to the product's withdrawal and passage of the 1976 Medical Device Regulation Act that enabled the FDA to regulate medical devices like IUDs. In 1984, EIS alumni collaborated with the FDA's Advisory Committee on Oral Contraceptives to reject a methodologically flawed Lancet study claiming an association between exposure to high-progesterone contraceptives and breast cancer among young women.

=== Later years ===
After retiring from the CDC in 1970, Langmuir taught at Harvard Medical School from 1970 to 1977 and served as a visiting professor at the Johns Hopkins School of Hygiene and Public Health from 1988 until his death in 1993.

In 1985, Langmuir reanalyzed Thucydides' history of the 430 BCE Plague of Athens, dismissing smallpox, bubonic plague, scarlet fever, measles, typhus, typhoid fever, ergotism, and meningitis as potential causes due to differences in the symptomology. Instead, Langmuir proposed that Athens experienced an influenza outbreak from zoonotic spillover of a livestock strain, leading to skin lesions and damaged respiratory mucosa colonized by Staphylococcus. Many of the gastrointestinal symptoms described by Thucydides align with toxic shock syndrome caused by the slow release of Staphylococcus toxins. Langmuir argued that the Athenian hoplites experienced a roughly 33% mortality rate, while the Spartans did not contract influenza during the Archidamian War, because overcrowding within the Long Walls of Athens increased the transmissibility of disease.

== Personal life ==
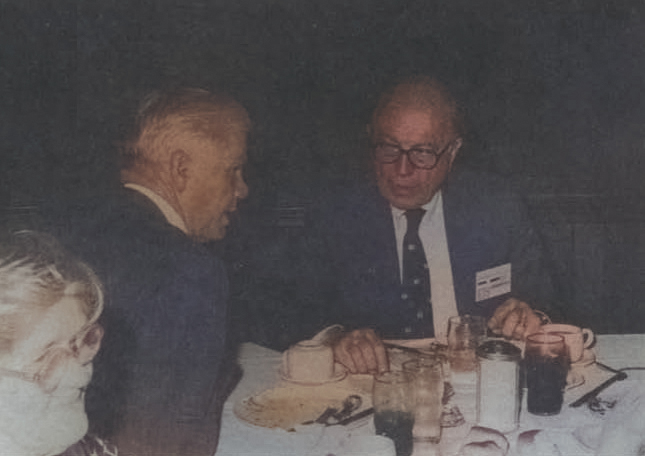
Langmuir with Leona Baumgartner and CDC Deputy Director William C. Watson Jr. at an EIS conference

In 1940, Langmuir married Sarah Ann Harper, and they had five children: Ann Ruggles Langmuir (1941–2004), Paul Harper Langmuir (1942–2010), Susan Davis Langmuir (1945–), Lynn Adams Langmuir (1951–2012), and Jane Adams Langmuir (1954–1963). Their marriage lasted until Sarah Ann Harper's death due to lung cancer in February 1969. Langmuir's children have criticized their father for his sexist attitudes and neglecting their development to focus on his epidemiological studies.

In 1970, Alexander Langmuir married former New York City Health Commissioner Leona Baumgartner. They lived together in Chilmark, Massachusetts, until her death on January 15, 1991, due to polycythemia.

On November 22, 1993, Langmuir died of kidney cancer at his home in Baltimore, Maryland. Langmuir was an atheist who renounced the concept of an afterlife. The October 1996 supplement to volume 144, issue 8 of the American Journal of Epidemiology was dedicated to covering Langmuir's impact on public health with many of the articles written by EIS alumni.

== Honors and awards ==
In October 1965, Langmuir received the American Public Health Association's Bronfman Prize for Public Health Achievement alongside New York City Health Commissioner George James and Puerto Rico Department of Health Director Guillermo Arbona.

Since 1966, the Epidemic Intelligence Service has awarded the Alexander D. Langmuir Prize at its annual conference to the manuscripts of current EIS officers and first-year alumni. The first recipient was a paper on smallpox vaccine complications by John M. Neff, J. Michael Lane, James H. Pert, Richard Moore, J. Donald Millar, and Donald Henderson, which was published in The New England Journal of Medicine.

Langmuir received an honorary Doctor of Science degree from Emory University in 1970 and an honorary Doctor of Law degree from Johns Hopkins University in 1978.

Since 1972, the Epidemic Intelligence Service's annual conference has included a Alexander D. Langmuir Lecture, the first of which was delivered by Charles H. Rammelkamp Jr. on the prevention of rheumatic heart disease.

In 1973, the American College of Physicians selected Langmuir for the James D. Bruce Memorial Award for Distinguished Contributions in Preventative Medicine. In 1979, Langmuir became the 17th recipient of the Royal Society of Medicine's Edward Jenner Medal.

In 1987, the Charles A. Dana Foundation conferred a Pioneer Achievement Award on Langmuir for establishing the United States' public health surveillance during his time as Chief Epidemiologist of the CDC.
