= S. Paul Ehrlich Jr. =

Surgeon General of the United States

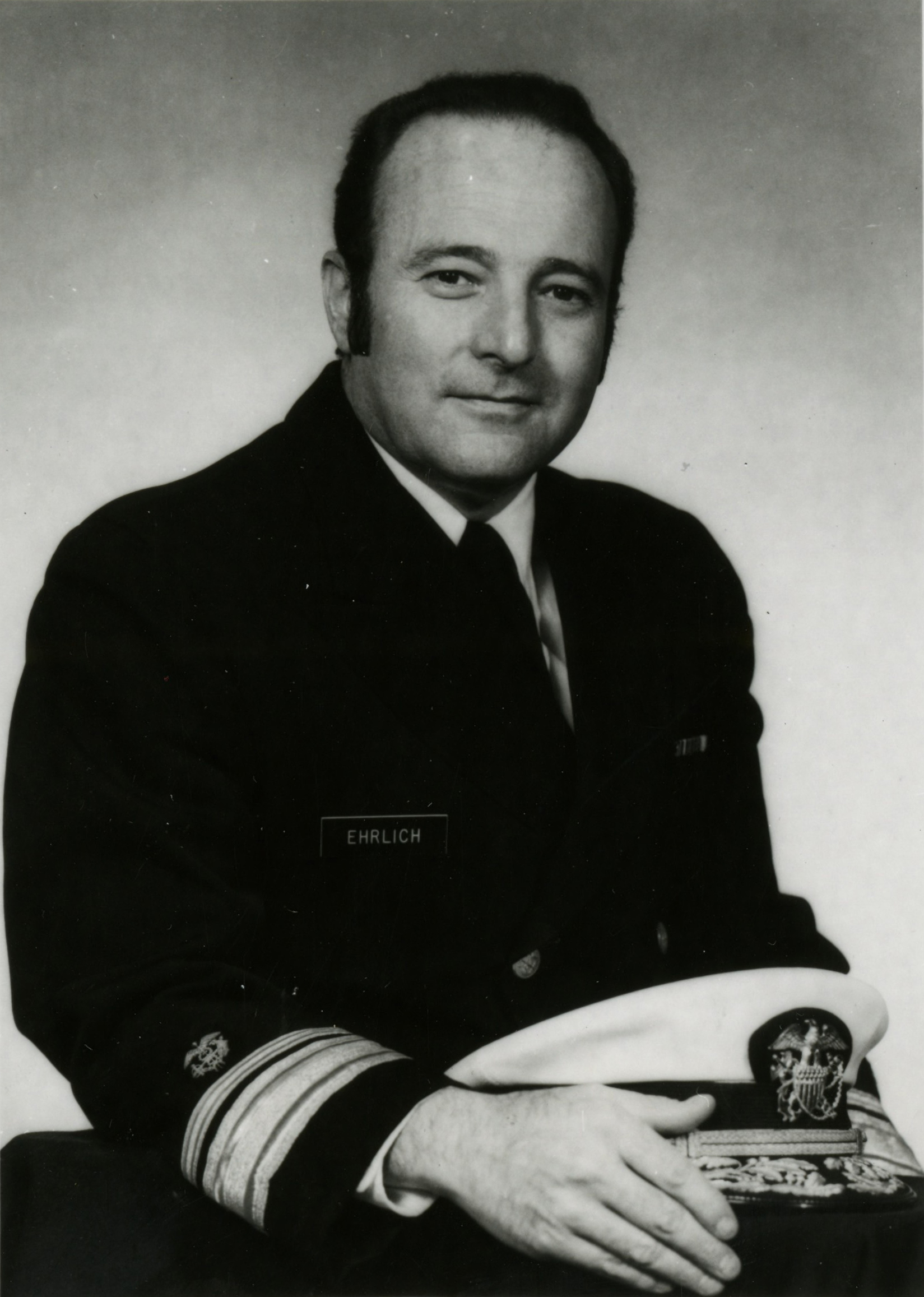

Surgeon General of the United States Acting
- In office January 31, 1973 – July 13, 1977
- President: Richard Nixon; Gerald Ford; Jimmy Carter
- Preceded by: Jesse Leonard Steinfeld
- Succeeded by: Julius B. Richmond

Personal details
- Born: Saul Paul Ehrlich Jr. May 4, 1932 Minneapolis, Minnesota, U.S.
- Died: January 6, 2005 (aged 72) Delray Beach, Florida, U.S.

Saul Paul Ehrlich Jr. (May 4, 1932 – January 6, 2005) was an American physician and public health administrator. He served as acting Surgeon General of the United States from 1973 to 1977.

- Director, Office of International Health, Office of the Secretary of Health, Education and Welfare (1969–1977)
- Chairman of Executive Board, World Health Organization (1972)
- Acting Surgeon General, United States Public Health Service (1973–77)
- Former Deputy Director, Pan American Health Organization (1978–1983)
- Founding member of the World Cultural Council (1981).
