= American Epidemiological Society =

American organization

The American Epidemiological Society is an American honorary society dedicated to epidemiology. It was established in 1927, and has held annual meetings since 1968. It is the oldest epidemiology organization in the United States. Past members of the society have included Wade H. Frost, Alexander Langmuir, Jonas Salk and Abraham Lilienfeld.
