= George James (physician) =

American physician (1915-1972)

George James (1915 – March 19, 1972) was an American physician who served as Commissioner of Health of the City of New York, dean of the Mount Sinai School of Medicine, and president of the Mount Sinai Medical Center.

== Biography ==
James was born in New York City in 1915 but moved to New Rochelle, New York when he was young. He graduated from Columbia College, Phi Beta Kappa, in 1937. He received his medical degree from the Yale School of Medicine, cum laude, in 1941. After completing his internship at Yale New Haven Hospital in 1942, he began his career in public health as assistant health officer in Williamson County, Tennessee.

He returned to the East Coast in 1944 and earned his master's degree in public health from Johns Hopkins University in 1945. James joined the New York State Department of Health and served until 1955, when he became director of public health of Akron, Ohio.

In 1956, he returned to New York City and became a deputy commissioner of health in charge of program planning, research, and evaluation activities. He was made First Deputy Commissioner of Public Health by Commissioner Leona Baumgartner, serving in that position from 1959 to 1962. As First Deputy Commissioner, he was the chief planner and policy advisor as well as the Department of Health and Mental Hygiene's coordinator of all operating and service programs.

In 1962, he became the Commissioner of Health of the City of New York. As Commissioner, James helped fluoridate the city's water supply, opened health clinics, and worked hard on reaching out to the community.

In 1965, James was appointed founding dean of the Mount Sinai School of Medicine. He became the first president of the Mount Sinai Health System in 1969. During his career he also served as president of the National Health Council.

James suffered a stroke in 1971, and died of a heart attack at the Good Samaritan Hospital on March 19, 1972. He was 56 years old.
