= Charles V. Chapin =

American physician (1856–1941)

Charles Value Chapin
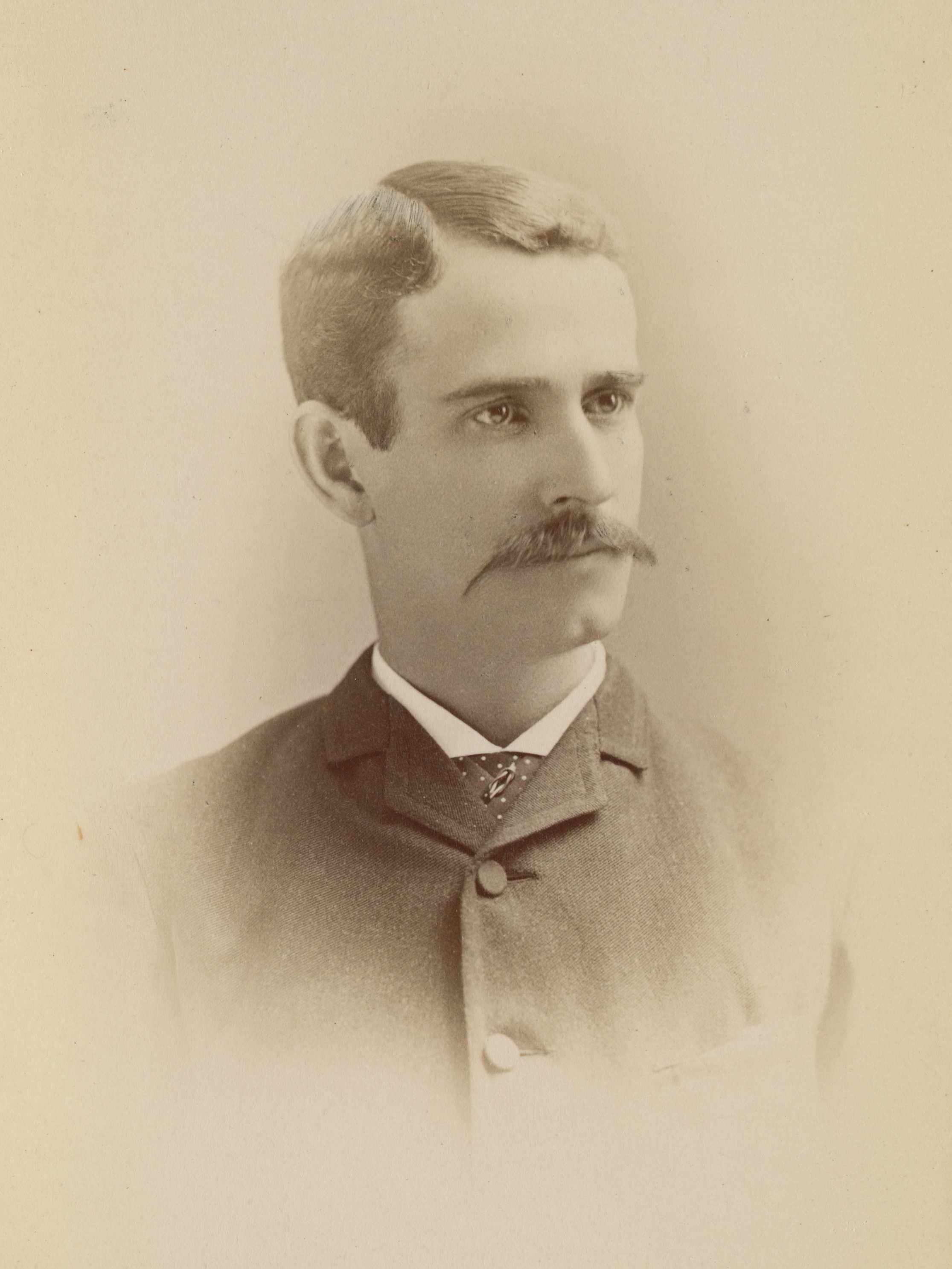
- Chapin in 1885
- Born: January 17, 1856; Providence, Rhode Island, U.S.
- Died: January 31, 1941 (aged 85); Providence, Rhode Island
- Burial place: Swan Point Cemetery
- Education: Brown University, Bellevue Medical College
- Occupation(s): Superintendent of Health for Providence, Rhode Island
- Years active: 1884-1932
- Known for: American pioneer in public health research and practice
- Medical career
- Field: Public health
- Notable works: Municipal Sanitation in the United States (1901); The Sources and Modes of Infection (1910); A Report on State Public Health Work Based on a Survey of State Boards of Health (1915)
- Awards: Marcellus Hartley Medal; Public Welfare Medal; Sedgewick Medal

Charles Value Chapin (January 17, 1856 – January 31, 1941) was an American pioneer in public health research and practice during the Progressive Era. He was superintendent of health for Providence, Rhode Island between 1884 and 1932. He established one of the earliest municipal public health laboratories in 1888, and the Providence City Hospital for contagious diseases in 1910. Chapin taught at Brown University and Harvard. In 1927 he served as president of the American Public Health Association and as the first president of the American Epidemiological Society.

His main fields of operation were working in the bacteriological laboratory, organizing public health measures, and publicizing urgent public health needs. He was an active proponent of the germ theory of disease, studying infectious diseases and their implications for public health. He strongly attacked common misconceptions of miasma theory, such as the idea that filth caused disease; that diseases were indiscriminately transmitted through the air by bad smells; and that disinfection was a cure-all for sanitary evils.

Chapin's scientific observations on the nature of the spread of infectious disease gained widespread support. Municipal Sanitation in the United States (1901) became the standard text on urban public health. The Sources and Modes of Infection (1910) influenced physicians and public health officials across United States and Europe by demonstrating the central importance of the human carrier who does not have the symptoms of the disease but carries the germs and spreads it.

In 1914, on behalf of the American Medical Association, Chapin carried out an "epoch-making study of state health departments", and published A Report on State Public Health Work Based on a Survey of State Boards of Health (1915). He developed the first quantitative instrument for scoring state agencies on the effectiveness of their health services. This approach influenced the work of others including the American Public Health Association (APHA). Chapin is credited with planting "the roots of quality in public health". Chapin's report also documents the speed at which laboratory services had become an important part of the public health system.

== Early life ==
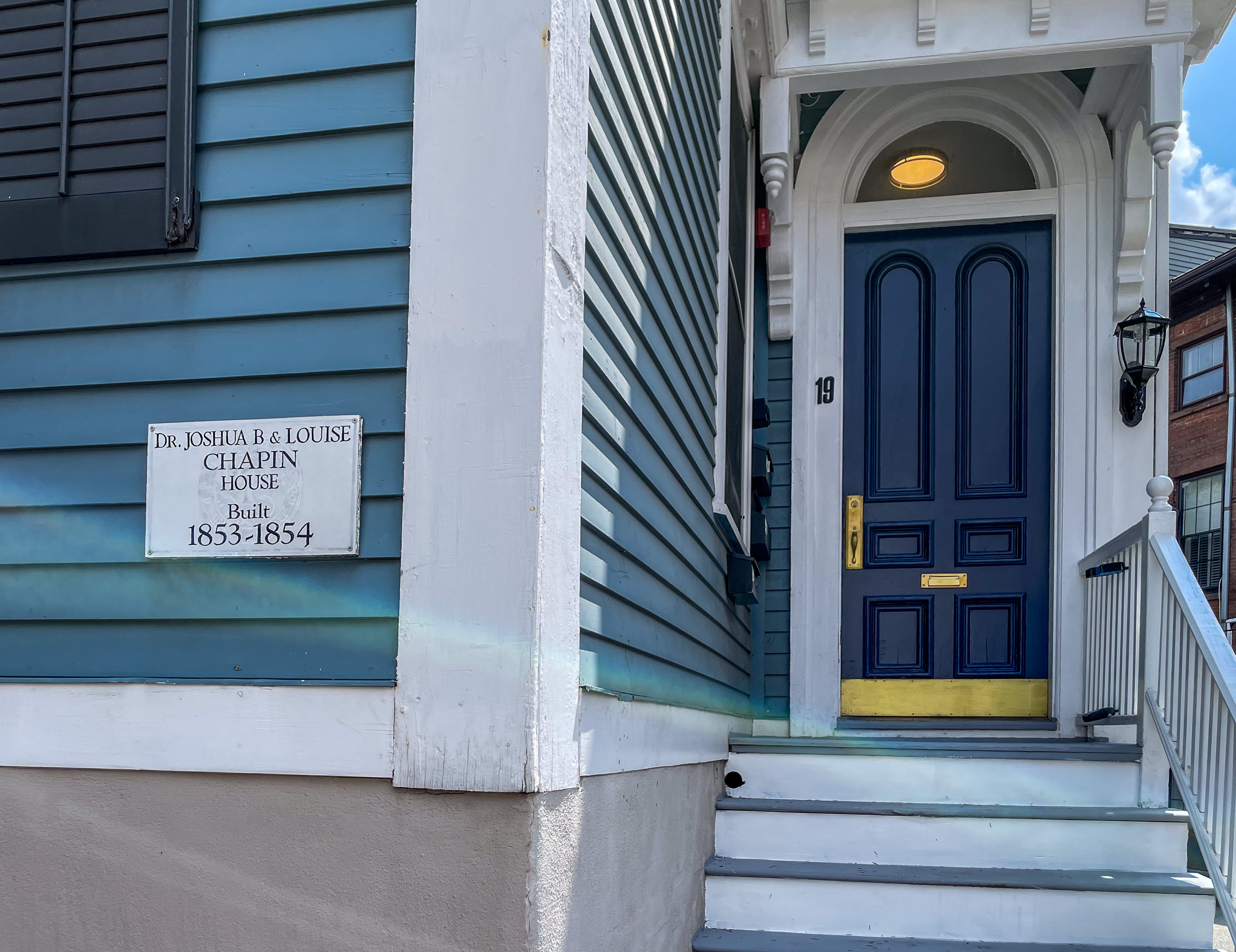
Chapin's family home on George Street

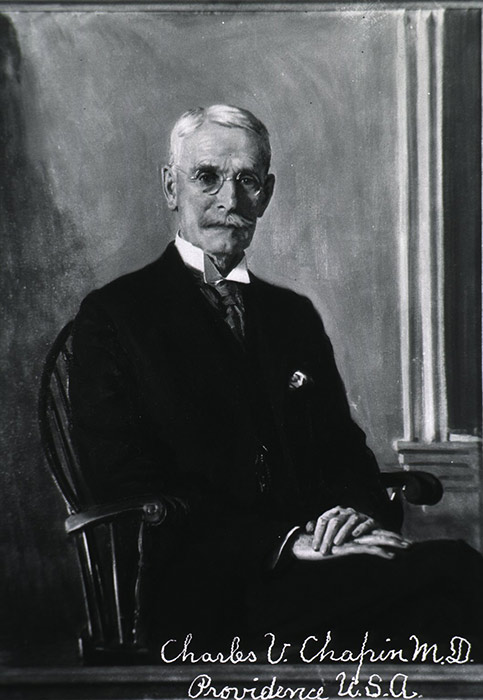
Charles Value Chapin

Charles Value Chapin was born in Providence, Rhode Island on January 17, 1856. His parents were Joshua Bicknell Chapin, variously a physician, pharmacist, photographer, and the Commissioner of Public Schools for Rhode Island; and Jane Catherine Louise Value, an artist and art teacher who painted portraits and miniatures.

Chapin attended Mowry and Goff School then Brown University, graduating in 1876. He began his medical education at New York's College of Physicians and Surgeons, then transferred to Bellevue Hospital Medical College, where he studied under Edward Gamaliel Janeway. He graduated Bellevue with an M.D. degree on February 27, 1879. He began his medical practice in 1880, but did not have a warm bedside manner. He was drawn more toward theory and statistics.

== Career ==
Chapin became the superintendent of health for Providence in 1884, following its first superintendent, Dr. Edwin M. Snow (1820–1888). Chapin retired as superintendent of health in 1932. Chapin established one of the earliest municipal public health laboratories in 1888 in Providence. He regarded it as an essential tool for public health, stating "The diagnostic laboratory is the most essential part of the machinery for the control of communicable diseases. Without it municipality and state can do nothing." The laboratory began culturing Corynebacterium diphtheriae from throat swabs as of January 1895. Chapin also helped to establish the Providence City Hospital in 1910 to focus solely on the treatment of contagious diseases.

Chapin faced several public health crises during his tenure.

=== Smallpox ===
Chapin was a strong proponent of vaccination for smallpox and other diseases. He publicly reported that he had had his wife, baby, and staff vaccinated for smallpox, and was quoted as writing "If health officers were not sure that vaccination is safe, we would not be fools enough to vaccinate ourselves and families every two or three years." Chapin tracked the incidence of smallpox in the United States between 1895 and 1912, compiling a detailed outline that considered patterns of transmission and severity of variants of the disease. He strongly criticized America's failure to engage in widespread vaccination, comparing the minor discomfort of being vaccinated to the months-long recovery from a "mild" (non-lethal) case of smallpox. He also pointed out the dangers of ignoring milder variants of a disease and failing to vaccinate when more serious variants could develop.

=== Cholera epidemics ===
Cholera epidemics threatened Providence several times during the 1880s; Chapin's response was to make personal inspections of every home and tenement in the city to remedy problems.

=== Influenza pandemic ===
In early September 1918, the first cases of the Spanish flu started appearing. By the end of the month, Chapin had identified over 2,500 cases. Chapin and other officials responded by ordering more hospital beds and increased staffing.

In The Sources and Modes of Infection (1910), Chapin had emphasized that "the effectiveness of isolation varies inversely as the number of missed cases and carriers". He argued that the tactic of isolating people who were symptomatic for an illness would be unsuccessful if large numbers of undiagnosed or asymptomatic cases still remained in the overall population. For this reason, Chapin did not believe that mass closures would be effective in combating the pandemic. Nevertheless, he did not oppose it when the Providence Board of Health issued a general closure order on October 6.

Throughout October and November Chapin and others advocated for people to take precautions to avoid contagion, and to promote their general health through measures such as good nutrition, exercise, and sleep. “Above all, leave alcohol alone and keep out of bar rooms.” Chapin continued to promote precautions against influenza into December, while cases were declining, to avoid another wave of infection.

The spread of the influenza reached its highest level in mid-October, dipped for a few weeks, then returned for a smaller second wave in January 1919. By February 5, no new cases were reported and the pandemic was declared over. A third wave appeared in the spring of 1919.

=== Other positions ===
Chapin taught physiology at Brown University starting in 1882. He held the position of instructor of physiology from 1882 to 1886, of professor of physiology from 1886 to 1894, and also director of physical culture from 1891 to 1894. He reported on gymnastics and sports.

Chapin lectured at Harvard Medical School in 1909. Chapin also lectured at the first professional training program for public health in America. It was founded jointly as the Harvard-MIT School of Health Officers in 1913, and became run solely by Harvard in 1922. Chapin lectured at the Harvard-MIT School from 1913 to 1922, and at the Harvard School of Hygiene from 1923 to 1931.

== Achievements ==
C. V. Chapin became a pre-eminent public health official in the United States. With a career spanning 48 years, he served as the superintendent of the Providence Department of Health and was hailed as the "Dean of City Health Officials". Chapin led successful community hygiene practices to combat the pandemic flu of 1918 at Providence.

Altogether Chapin published more than 113 titles. By 1910 his book Municipal Sanitation in the United States (1901) was the standard text on urban public health. Two more classic works were The Sources and Modes of Infection (1910) and A Report on State Public Health Work Based on a Survey of State Boards of Health (1915). Six of his papers were in the category of public-health administration, five were in communicable diseases and five were published in epidemiology and vital statistics. Later review found five of the papers particularly noteworthy, including The Fetich of Disinfection (1906), and Studies in Air and Contact Infection at the Providence City Hospital (1911). These two contained the basic tenets of the Sources and Modes of Infection cited above. He published on the administrative and resource aspects of the public's health, in How Should We Spend the Health Appropriation? (1913).

Chapin's contributions to community hygiene and sanitary science were lasting. He taught that diseases come from germs, carried by persons or animals and not things, and that they are spread by contact, food, and animal carriers. His emphasis on contact at close range, for example through touching, exchange of bodily fluids, and large respiratory droplets, would shape the next 100 years of infectious disease control. However, Chapin minimized the idea of airborne transmission of smaller particles in part because of its similarity to the idea of dangerous stinks in miasma theory. In rejecting miasma theory, Chapin largely ignored the public health implications of pollution in the air and water supply, and hazardous chemicals, where germs were not involved.

Chapin inspired others to evaluate all of the collective efforts of community hygiene in terms of outcomes, an early effort to quantify the social sciences aspect of public-health practice. Further, he was a forerunner to the notion of health disparities among the poor, having published Deaths among Taxpayers and Non-Taxpayers (1924), an early connection of health and economic status. In 1926 he published Changes in Type of Contagious Diseases, which described the variety of infectious agents in smallpox vs. scarlet fever.

He became president of the American Public Health Association in 1926–1927. He served as first president of the American Epidemiological Society in 1927. During his lifetime it was written that his contributions to the philosophy and methodology of public health were greater than "any living man". He was compared to his forerunners in the field, Frank, Edwin Chadwick, Simon, Lemuel Shattuck, William Thompson Sedgwick, and Hermann Biggs, as one of the greats of all time in public health.

== Legacy and honors ==
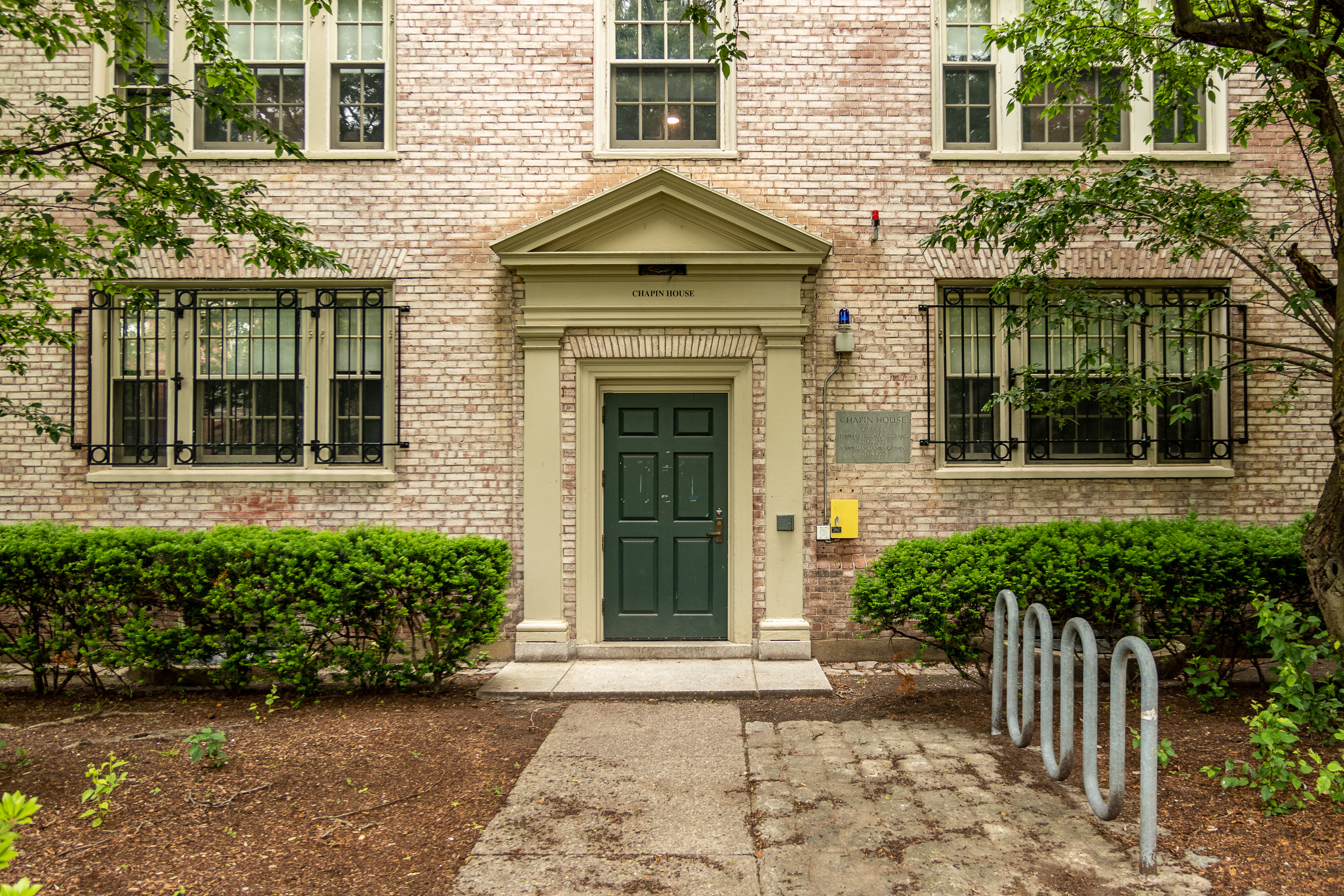
Chapin House, Brown University

Brown University awarded Chapin with an honorary Sc.D. degree in 1909. He also received an honorary degree from Rhode Island State College and an honorary doctorate of laws from Yale University (1927), where C.-E. A. Winslow was chair.

The Providence City Hospital was renamed the "Charles V. Chapin Hospital" in 1931 to recognize his substantial contributions to improving the sanitary condition of the city of Providence. The "Dr. Charles V. Chapin Health Laboratory", housing state public health, environmental and forensic laboratories, is named for him. The Brown University dormitory "Chapin House" bears his name.

In 1927, Charles V. Chapin became the first honorary member of the Delta Omega society for studies in public health In 1928 he was awarded the Marcellus Hartley Gold Medal (now the Public Welfare Medal) from the National Academy of Sciences. He received the inaugural Sedgwick Memorial Medal from the American Public Health Association (APHA) in 1929. In 1935, he was given Brown University's Rosenberger Medal, awarded by the faculty for “specially notable or beneficial achievement.” Chapin was posthumously inducted into the Rhode Island Heritage Hall of Fame in 1966.

== Death and burial ==
Chapin died on January 31, 1941, in Providence, Rhode Island.

== Bibliography ==
=== Publications ===
- Municipal Sanitation in the United States. Snow & Farnham, Providence, RI. 1901.
- The Sources and Modes of Infection. John Wiley & Sons, New York. 1910.
- A Report on State Public Health Work Based on a Survey of State Boards of Health, American Medical Association, Chicago, 1915.
- Papers of Charles V. Chapin, MD: a review of public health realities. The Commonwealth Fund, 1934.
- Rhode Island. State Board of Health. Sanitary legislation in the United States: enacted during the year 1906 / compiled for the State Board of Health by Charles V. Chapin. Providence, [R.I.] : E.L. Freeman Co., printers to the State, 1906.
- Chapin, Charles V. (February 1913). "The value of human life". American Journal of Public Health. 3 (2): 101–105. doi:10.2105/AJPH.3.2.101-a. PMC 1089529. PMID 18008791.

=== Biography ===
- Cassedy, James H. (1962). Charles V. Chapin and the Public Health Movement. Cambridge, MA: Harvard University Press.

=== Archives ===
- Charles V. Chapin Papers, Brown University Library
- Charles V. Chapin Personal Library, Brown University Library
- Charles V. Chapin Papers, Rhode Island Historical Society
- "Guide to the Charles V. Chapin Papers, 1880-1941". Rhode Island Historical Society. 2009.
- Providence Board of Health records, including photographs taken by Dr. Charles V. Chapin.
