= Julius B. Richmond =

American governmental official

Julius Richmond
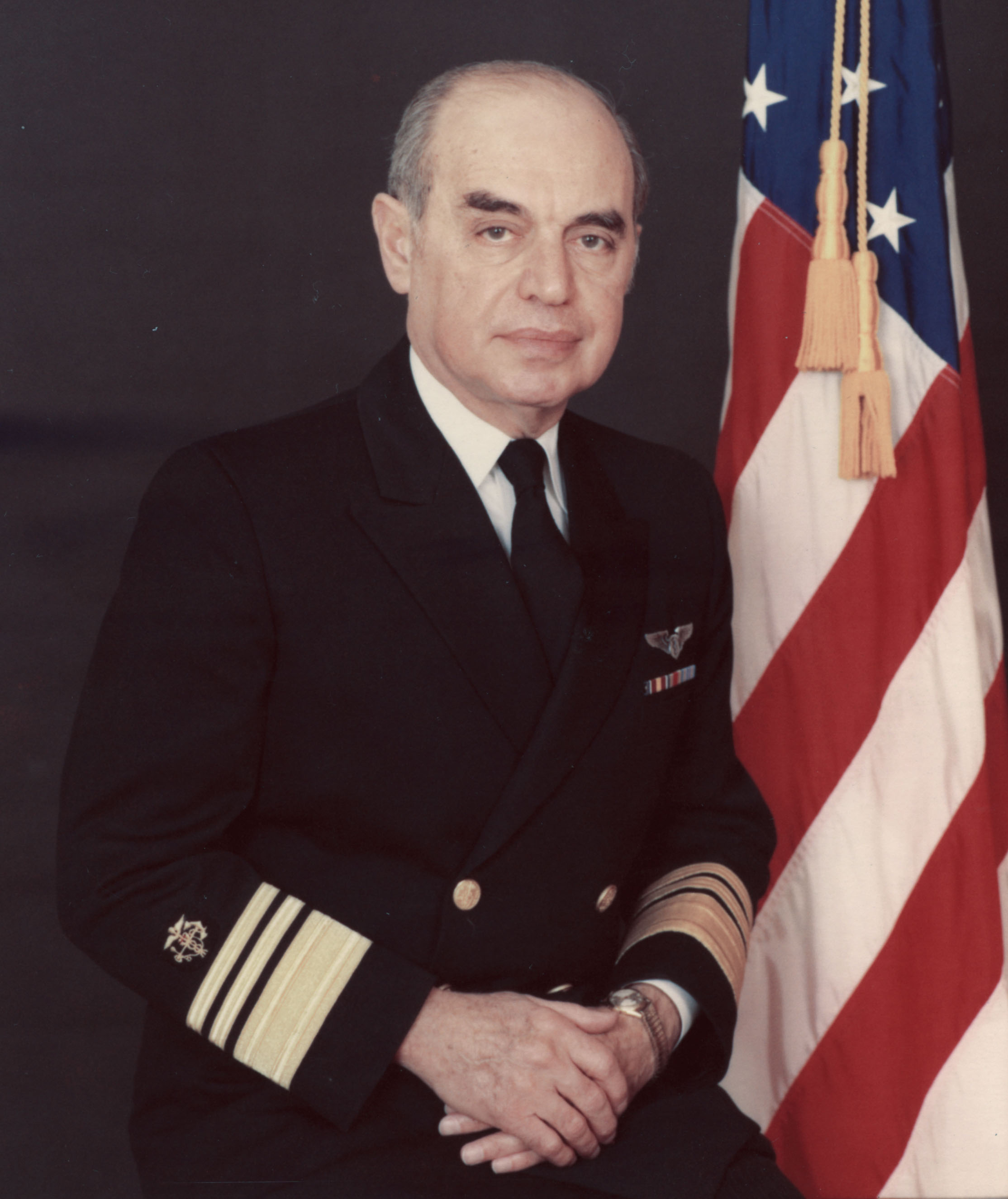
- Official portrait

12th Surgeon General of the United States
- In office July 13, 1977 – May 14, 1981
- President: Jimmy Carter; Ronald Reagan
- Preceded by: S. Paul Ehrlich Jr. (acting)
- Succeeded by: Edward Brandt Jr. (acting)

Personal details
- Born: September 26, 1916 Chicago, Illinois, U.S.
- Died: July 27, 2008 (aged 91) Chestnut Hill, Massachusetts, U.S.

Julius Benjamin Richmond (September 26, 1916 – July 27, 2008) was an American pediatrician and public health administrator. He was a vice admiral in the United States Public Health Service Commissioned Corps and served as the United States Surgeon General and the United States Assistant Secretary for Health during the Carter Administration, from 1977 to 1981. Richmond is noted for his role in the creation of the Head Start program for disadvantaged children, serving as its first national director.

== Biography ==
=== Early years ===
Richmond was born in Chicago. He was educated during the Great Depression, earning his B.S. at the University of Illinois at Urbana-Champaign, followed by an M.S. in physiology and his M.D. from the University of Illinois College of Medicine in 1939. After completing an 18-month rotating internship at Cook County Hospital in Chicago, Richmond entered two pediatrics residencies, the first at Chicago's Municipal Contagious Disease Hospital (1941–1942) and the second at Cook. The United States’ entry into World War II interrupted Richmond's postgraduate training, as he volunteered and was inducted into the Army Air Corps in February 1942. Through 1946 Richmond worked as a flight surgeon with the Air Force's Flying Training Command.

=== Career ===
After World War II, Richmond completed his residency and began what would be a distinguished academic career in which public service was an integral part of scholarly research. He began as a professor in pediatrics at his alma mater (1946–53) and a Markle Foundation scholar in medical science (1948–53), and was active both in nonprofit children's welfare organizations and Chicago's Institute for Psychoanalysis. During 1953 he moved to the State University of New York at Syracuse College of Medicine (now known as the Upstate Medical Center). The Supreme Court's decision in Brown v. Board of Education (1954) inspired Richmond and his colleague, Betty Caldwell, to turn their interdisciplinary research, integrating elements of psychiatry into pediatrics, toward policy ends as they documented how poverty threatened the psychosocial development of young children. They focused on cognitive abilities developed during a child's first years, where functional deficits linked to poverty, for example, those caused by malnutrition, could make learning more difficult and as a result, put the children of the poor at risk of failing both at school and later on, in attempts to advance economically.

Richmond's work at Syracuse caught the eye of Sargent Shriver, head of the Kennedy Foundation. After President Lyndon B. Johnson tapped Shriver to head a new independent agency, the Office of Economic Opportunity (OEO) (1964), Shriver convinced Richmond to take a leave of absence and join him. At OEO Richmond would use a demonstration grants mechanism to create two important new public health programs that incorporated OEO's mandate to aid local groups directly, rather than channeling resources through state health departments, the traditional partners of the Department of Health, Education, and Welfare's Public Health Service. During 1965, Richmond implemented Project Head Start, an enrichment program for disadvantaged pre-school age children that was greeted eagerly by community groups. Building on health-related proposals submitted in response to Head Start, in 1966 Richmond sponsored a series of Neighborhood Health Centers that united economic development and local oversight of, and participation in, health services delivery.

In 1967, Richmond left OEO to return to Syracuse, to serve as Dean of the medical faculty. During 1971 he moved to Harvard Medical School, where he held professorships in two departments, Child Psychiatry and Human Development (1971–73) and Preventive & Social Medicine (1971–79), directed the Judge Baker Guidance Center in Boston (1971–77), a nonprofit mental health organization that works with Boston's juvenile courts, and also served as Chief of Psychiatry at the Children's Hospital Boston.

=== Surgeon General ===
Nearly a decade later after Richmond stepped down from OEO, former OEO official Joseph Califano, now President Jimmy Carter’s Secretary of DHEW, asked him to return to Federal service as Assistant Secretary for Health (July 1977). Richmond accepted, on condition that his position as Assistant Secretary, with its line authority over PHS, be combined with that of Surgeon General, widely recognized as a spokesperson for public health. Califano obliged with a December 1977 inhouse reorganization that boosted and streamlined PHS's management capabilities through its Office of the Assistant Secretary for Health (OASH).

Richmond brought a commitment to access and equity that reflected his earlier work implementing President Johnson's Great Society. In national health affairs, however, the latter half of the 1970s was a period of retrenchment and effort to curb health-related expenditures. Economic downturns challenged the country's willingness to support a continued expansion of health care programs and after 1974, the removal of wage and price controls on health care providers meant dramatic cost increases for the Medicare and Medicaid programs. Many believed that controls were a necessary prerequisite to any form of national health insurance, and the type of controls became a point of contention, for example, with the Congress opposing the Carter Administration's decision to focus on hospital expenditures.

Despite the times, Richmond's neighborhood health centers remained, championed by Congress and reinforced by an assortment of PHS programs to improve access to care. Transferred to PHS jurisdiction in the early 1970s, neighborhood health centers were renamed Community Health Centers, authorized under 1975 legislation, scaled down and revamped to focus on rural (1975) and urban (1977) areas, spread thin to include new constituencies like residents of Appalachia and migrant workers and those served by PHS's National Health Service Corps. During Richmond's tenure, Congress would pass the Health Services and Centers Act of 1978 (PL95-626), which reauthorized a broad array of public health services, community and migrant health centers, grants for primary care projects, and grants-in-aid to support public health programs and authorized $2.9 billion in expenditures. The health of children also remained a top priority. The Communicable Disease Center (CDC) carried out a successful immunization campaign that focused on measles and other childhood diseases that disproportionately affected the poor, meeting an initial goal of immunizing at least 90 percent of eligible children by October 1979. In addition, there were efforts to establish a Child Health Assurance Program to improve prevention by broadening eligibility for the existing Medicaid Early and Periodic Screening, Diagnosis and Treatment Program.

At PHS Richmond remains best known for his leadership in devising and implementing quantitative goals for public health, first published in 1979 as Healthy People: The Surgeon General’s Report on Health Promotion and Disease Prevention. Healthy People moved PHS beyond its limited capabilities to lessen disparities in health services provision, to spur change by getting information out to journalists, health departments, and others about gains already made in reduced mortality from noninfectious causes. Richmond and Secretary Califano drew on the precedent of former Surgeon General Luther Terry's 1964 Report on Smoking and Health to build professional and public consensus toward making prevention key to PHS's efforts.

A new Office of Disease Prevention and Health Promotion (1979) under Assistant Surgeon General Michael McGinnis prepared the formal publication, setting forth ambitious health goals to be achieved by 1990, and the Institute of Medicine drafted an accompanying volume, Promoting Health/Preventing Disease: Objectives For The Nation (1980), which included a series of specific targets within set categories for each age-group. One of the major goals of this effort was to educate people on how they could take more personal responsibility for their health through wise lifestyle choices. Richmond's Healthy People campaign was a remarkable success, especially in light of the political firestorm in Congress and by the tobacco industry when Secretary Califano became an outspoken critic of cigarette smoking as a major contributor to preventable disease.

=== Later years ===
After the Reagan Administration assumed power in January 1981, Richmond stepped down from his dual post and returned to academia.

At Harvard, Richmond would serve as a Professor of Health Policy (1981–1988) and as the John D. MacArthur Professor of Management and Director of the Division of Health Policy Research and Education (1987 onward) and as well chair the steering committee of the National Academy of Sciences' Forum on the Future of Children and Families (NAS). From 1988 he was Emeritus at Harvard Medical School in the Department of Social Medicine (DSM), now the Department of Global Health and Social Medicine, which he had founded under HMS Dean Robert Ebert.

Richmond died of cancer at age 91 at his home in Chestnut Hill, Massachusetts, near Boston, on July 27, 2008.

A collection of his papers is held at the National Library of Medicine in Bethesda, Maryland.

== Awards ==
- The 10th Annual Heinz Award in Public Policy (2004)
