= Burney, Indiana =

Burney
- Unincorporated community and Census-designated place
- Location within Indiana Location within the United States
- Coordinates: 39°19′05″N 85°38′23″W
- Country: United States
- State: Indiana
- County: Decatur
- Township: Clay
- Elevation: 827 ft (252 m)
- ZIP code: 47240
- FIPS code: 18-09334
- GNIS feature ID: 2830350

Burney is an unincorporated community in Clay Township, Decatur County, Indiana.

== History ==
Burney was laid out in 1882. Burney was the name of a local family. A post office was established at Burney in 1884, and remained in operation until it was discontinued in 1995.

== Demographics ==
The United States Census Bureau delineated Burney as a census designated place in the 2022 American Community Survey.

== Notable person ==
Leroy Edgar Burney, Surgeon General under Eisenhower, was born in Burney, Indiana.
