= Leroy Edgar Burney =

American physician (1906–1998)

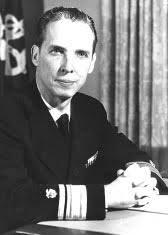

8th Surgeon General of the United States
- In office August 8, 1956 – January 29, 1961
- President: Dwight D. Eisenhower; John F. Kennedy
- Preceded by: Leonard A. Scheele
- Succeeded by: Luther Leonidas Terry

Personal details
- Born: December 31, 1906 Burney, Indiana, U.S.
- Died: July 31, 1998 (aged 91) Park Ridge, Illinois, U.S.
- Resting place: Crown Hill Cemetery and Arboretum, Section 46, Lot 208; 39.8201444°N 86.1712536°W
- Education: Butler University; Indiana University Bloomington

Leroy Edgar Burney (December 31, 1906 – July 31, 1998) was an American physician and public health official. He was appointed the eighth Surgeon General of the United States from 1956 to 1961.

== Biography ==
=== Early years ===
Burney was born in Burney, Indiana, a town founded by his great-grandfather. He began premedical coursework at Butler University (1924–26) and completed both undergraduate and medical training at Indiana University Bloomington (Bachelor of Science, 1928; Doctor of Medicine, 1930). An introduction to the Public Health Service (PHS) came through a one-year internship at the Chicago Marine Hospital. Initiation into the world of public health followed when Burney took advantage of a fellowship to study at the Johns Hopkins School of Hygiene and Public Health (Master of Science, 1931). Courtesy of the renowned epidemiologist Dr. W. H. Frost and the Rockefeller Foundation, Burney was allowed to extend his studies for six months of field work at the Joint Health Department of Charlottesville, Virginia, immunizing preschool children against diphtheria.

=== Career ===
Burney, a resident of Charlottesville, sought for and was approved as an Assistant Surgeon in the PHS Regular Corps (1932). His area of expertise would be public health administration at the state and local level, the front lines of public health. Like many of his generation at PHS, Burney came up through the ranks of then-Surgeon General Thomas Parran, Jr.’s venereal disease control programs, receiving specialized training at the New York Marine Hospital (1934) and assisting in the management of rapid treatment centers around the country. Burney helped establish the first PHS mobile venereal disease clinic, in Brunswick, Georgia (1937–39), bringing access to treatment for African Americans, whom Jim Crow segregation excluded from the predominantly white locations of other facilities.

Burney spent most of World War II stateside, where he served as Assistant Chief of PHS's Division of State Relations (1943–44), except for a five-month detail to the Navy, where he traveled to the Mediterranean on behalf of the War Shipping Administration, to address infectious disease problems affecting ports. After the war, Burney continued his work with state and county health departments, directing PHS's New Orleans district office (1945) and then accepting a detail to be State Health Commissioner and Secretary of Indiana's new State Board of Health (1945–54) and teach at the Indiana University School of Medicine. In 1954 Burney returned to PHS as an Assistant Surgeon General and Deputy Chief of the Bureau of State Services, overseeing grants-in-aid to the states while being prepared for leadership by then-Surgeon General Leonard A. Scheele.

=== Surgeon General ===
When Surgeon General Scheele stepped down in August 1956, President Dwight D. Eisenhower nominated Burney on a recess appointment, and was sworn in as Surgeon General on August 8, 1956, and later confirmed by the Senate in January 1957. Surgeon General Burney applied his administrative know-how to steer PHS successfully through institutional growing pains as the agency responded to new and, at times, conflicting demands from the public, professional and voluntary advocacy groups, the parent Department, and the Congress. The key issues of the day were environmental health and access to health services, the former driven by widely shared alarm over deteriorating environmental conditions and fallout from the atmospheric testing of nuclear weapons and the latter by expectations that national health insurance would soon be realized. In many ways the Kerr-Mills Act of 1960, which authorized government financing of services for senior citizens without adequate means to pay for care, prefigured the Medicare and Medicaid programs that would transform national policy during the following decades.

In response, Burney mustered his leadership to gather facts, draft plans for modernizing PHS and take action. Under future Surgeon General William H. Stewart, the Office of the Surgeon General's Division of Public Health Methods staffed a number of investigatory and advisory bodies whose reports still inform policy decisionmaking, including the Secretary's Consultants on Medical Research and Education (Bayne-Jones report, 1958); the Surgeon General's Consultant Group on Medical Education (Bane report, 1959); the Surgeon General's Report on Environmental Health Problems submitted to the House Appropriations Subcommittee (1959); and the Study Group on the Mission and Organization of the Public Health Service (Hundley report, 1960). In addition, during July 1957 Public Health Methods began implementing the National Health Survey Act of 1956, conducting the first periodic national surveys of chronic disease morbidity and health services: the triennial Health Interview Survey, and the mobile Health Examination Survey (which in 1971 became the Health and Nutrition Examination Survey).

The Hundley Committee report urged that PHS shed the institutional remnants of its early missions (the hospitals and quarantine) and reorganize to better fulfill its post-1940 mandate to promote civilian public health. Unable to obtain formal authority from Congress but with permission from the Secretary of United States Department of Health, Education, and Welfare, Burney began reorienting PHS structure to reflect its new functions. The Bureau of State Services was divided into two parts, one devoted to issues related to services delivery, under the rubric of "community health," and the other devoted to environmental health. Environmental programs were consolidated and upgraded, with new Division-level units created for radiological health (1957) and air pollution (1960) and a new National Advisory Committee on Radiation. With the exception of the multidisciplinary National Institute of Mental Health, institutional boundaries were redrawn to distinguish services-oriented programs at the Bureau of Medical Services from research at the National Institutes of Health and from information gathering units such as the National Library of Medicine groundbreaking for Bethesda, Maryland facility in June, 1959 and the National Center for Health Statistics established in August 1960, comprising Public Health Method's surveys group and PHS's National Vital Statistics Division.

Surgeon General Burney also refashioned his position to emphasize his role as a spokesperson on behalf of public health. In 1957 and again in 1959, he was the first Federal official to publicly identify cigarette smoke as a cause of lung cancer, issuing statements that paved the way for his successor, Surgeon General Luther L. Terry. Traditional public health functions remained no less important. During his tenure Burney played a leadership role in public health affairs both internationally chairing the U.S. delegation to the 1959 World Health Assembly and domestically serving as President of the Association of State and Territorial Health Officers. In addition, he supported an effective response by the Communicable Disease Center to the 1957 Asian influenza pandemic and gave ongoing, measured support to the development of the oral polio vaccine developed by Albert Sabin.

=== Later years ===
On January 29, 1961, shortly after President John F. Kennedy’s inauguration, Surgeon General Burney stepped down from his post to give the new Democratic administration the opportunity to nominate its own choice for Surgeon General. Reforms and ideas raised during Burney's administration would become the foundations of health policy under Presidents Kennedy and Lyndon B. Johnson. After retiring from PHS, Burney served as Vice President for Health Sciences at Temple University and on the Board of the Milbank Memorial Fund until his retirement in 1990. He died on July 31, 1998, in Park Ridge, Illinois.
