= Jesse Leonard Steinfeld =

United States Surgeon general

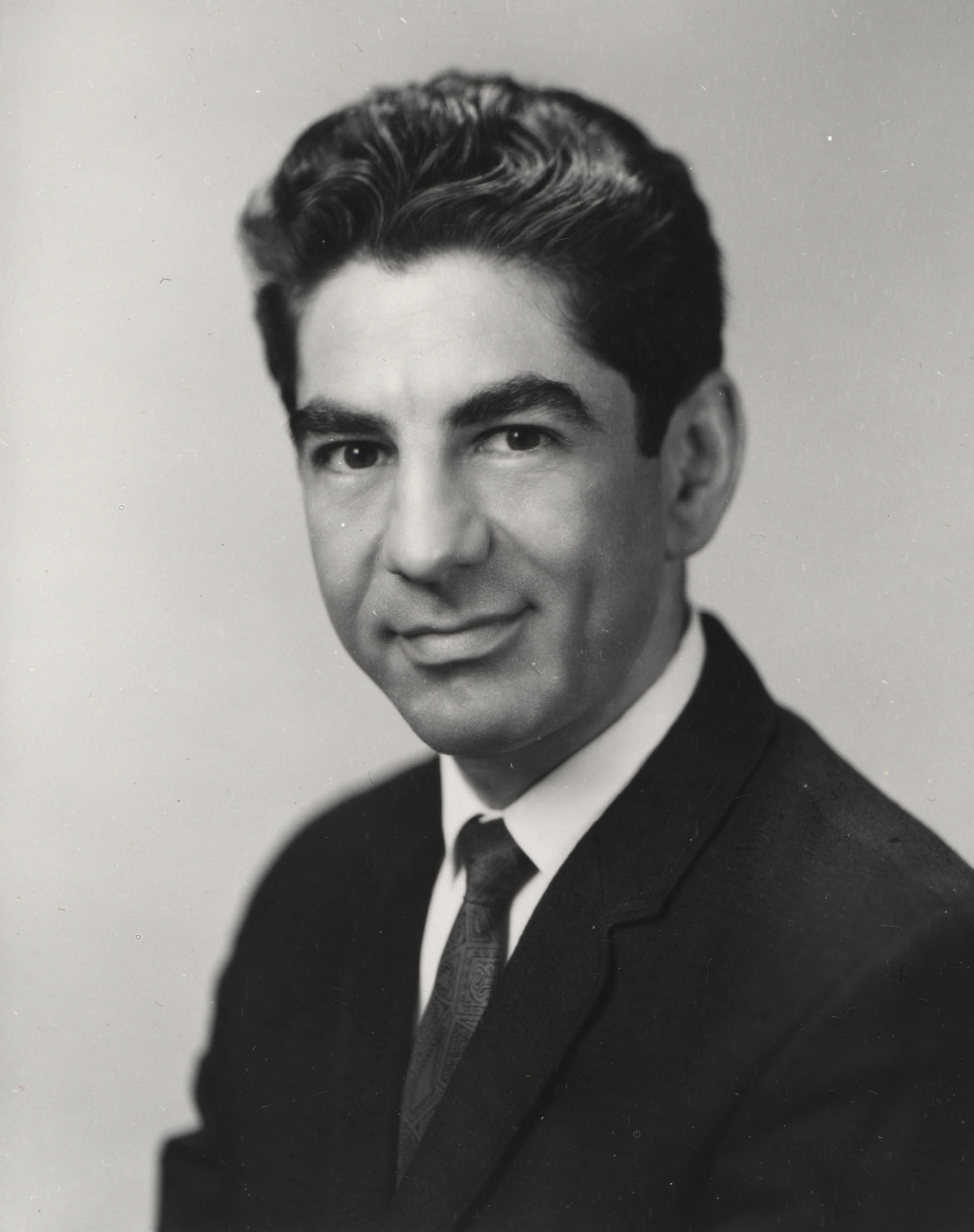

11th Surgeon General of the United States
- In office December 18, 1969 – January 30, 1973
- President: Richard M. Nixon
- Preceded by: William H. Stewart
- Succeeded by: Julius B. Richmond

Personal details
- Born: January 6, 1927 Aliquippa, Pennsylvania, U.S.
- Died: August 5, 2014 (aged 87) Pomona, California, U.S.
- Party: Republican
- Children: Susan Steinfeld, Mary Beth Steinfeld, Jody Stefansson
- Education: University of Pittsburgh, Case Western Reserve University

Jesse Leonard Steinfeld (January 6, 1927 – August 5, 2014) was an American physician and public health official. He was appointed the eleventh surgeon general of the United States from 1969 to 1973.

== Early life and education ==
Steinfeld was born in the Pittsburgh, Pennsylvania, suburb of West Aliquippa. He was the son of Jewish immigrants from Hungary. His father was a smoker and died when Steinfeld was 5 years of age. His mother ran a dry goods and hardware store. He received his B.S. from the University of Pittsburgh in 1945 and his M.D. degree from Western Reserve University (now called Case Western Reserve University) in 1949. Steinfeld then completed an internship at Cedars of Lebanon Hospital in Los Angeles and residencies at the Veterans Administration Hospital in Long Beach, California, and at the University of California, San Francisco in the Laboratory of Experimental Oncology.

== Early career ==
Steinfeld became instructor in medicine at the University of California, San Francisco in 1952. From 1954 to 1958, he served as director of the radioisotope laboratory of the National Cancer Institute, National Institutes of Health, and simultaneously held an appointment as instructor in medicine at the George Washington University School of Medicine. In 1959, he joined the faculty of the University of Southern California School of Medicine as assistant professor of medicine, rising through the ranks to associate professor in 1963 and professor in 1967. His research interests focused on cancer.

In 1968, Steinfeld returned to the National Cancer Institute as associate director for programs. The following year, he was made deputy director of the institute.

== Surgeon general ==
He was appointed deputy assistant secretary for health and scientific affairs, and surgeon general beginning December 18, 1969.

A reorganization of the Public Health Service in 1968 had transferred its leadership to the Assistant Secretary for Health and Scientific Affairs, so Steinfeld no longer had the line management authority of surgeons general in the pre-1968 period. During his tenure, there was an effort to do away with the Public Health Service Commissioned Corps, and a 1971 report made such a recommendation. The report also called the position of surgeon general "an organizational anomaly," thus calling into question the need for such a position. Steinfeld spoke on behalf of the internal opposition to the report, and thanks to strong support for the corps and the surgeon general on the part of certain members of the United States Congress, the recommendations of the report were not implemented.

During Steinfeld's tenure as surgeon general, two important new Public Health Service programs were established, the National Institute for Occupational Safety and Health and the National Health Service Corps. As a specialist in the field of cancer, Steinfeld also no doubt welcomed the passage of the National Cancer Act of 1971, which enhanced the ability of the Public Health Service to combat this deadly disease.

== Later career ==
At the beginning of the second Richard Nixon administration, Steinfeld resigned as surgeon general effective 30 January 1973. He then served as director of the Mayo Clinic Comprehensive Cancer Center and as professor of medicine at the Mayo Medical School (1973–1974). Following that, Steinfeld was professor of medicine at the University of California, Irvine and chief of medicine at the Veterans Administration Hospital in Long Beach, California, from 1974 to 1976. He then served as dean and professor of medicine at the School of Medicine of the Medical College of Virginia from 1976 to 1983. Steinfeld became president of the Medical College of Georgia in 1983, a position that he held until his retirement in 1987.

== Death ==
Steinfeld died on August 5, 2014, from complications from a stroke in Pomona, California, aged 87.

== Other websites ==
- Office of Public Health and Science (4 January 2007). "Office of the Surgeon General: Jesse Leonard Steinfeld (1969–1973)". U.S. Department of Health and Human Services. Archived from the original on 16 September 2008.
