= William H. Stewart =

American physician

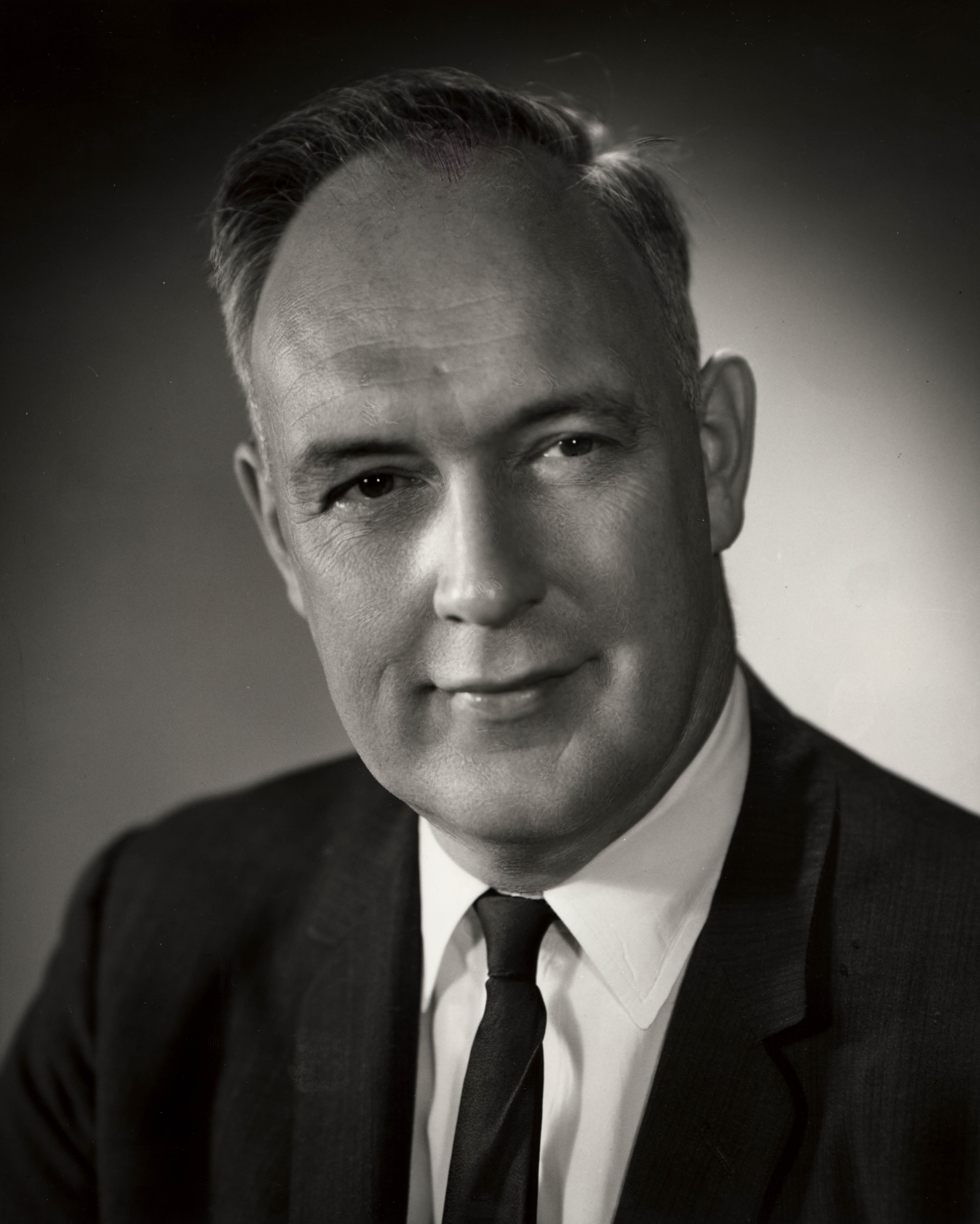

10th Surgeon General of the United States
- In office October 1, 1965 – August 1, 1969
- President: Lyndon B. Johnson; Richard Nixon
- Preceded by: Luther Terry
- Succeeded by: Jesse L. Steinfeld

Personal details
- Born: May 19, 1921 Minneapolis, Minnesota, USA
- Died: April 23, 2008 (aged 86) Metairie, Louisiana, USA

William H. Stewart (May 19, 1921 – April 23, 2008) was an American pediatrician and epidemiologist. He was appointed tenth Surgeon General of the United States from 1965 to 1969.

== Biography ==
=== Early life and education ===
Stewart was born in Minneapolis, Minnesota. He began college at the University of Minnesota and completed his undergraduate degree at Louisiana State University (LSU) (1942), after his father moved the family to Baton Rouge during World War II to chair the pediatrics department at LSU. Stewart earned his medical degree through an accelerated program at the LSU Health Sciences Center in New Orleans, under the auspices of the U.S. Army's Specialized Training Program.

After graduating in 1945, he received a commission as a first lieutenant, kept an inactive status during his 9-month internship at Philadelphia General Hospital, and then served as a Medical Officer at Brooke General Hospital in San Antonio, Texas (1946–1947). After a brief stint at the Minneapolis Veterans Administration hospital at Fort Snelling, Stewart returned home to Baton Rouge for a 2-year pediatrics residency at Charity Hospital (1948–1950). His plans to enter private practice were cut short by the outbreak of the Korean War and his remaining military obligation.

=== Early career ===
Stewart's introduction to the Public Health Service (PHS) came when the Air Force agreed to transfer him into the first class of renowned epidemiologist Alexander Langmuir's Epidemic Intelligence Service (EIS) at the Communicable Disease Center (CDC). In February 1951, Stewart accepted a Commission in PHS's Inactive Reserve as a Senior Assistant Surgeon. Four months later, he was dispatched as the sole physician epidemiologist to CDC’s Thomasville, Georgia Field Station. As an EIS Fellow he worked under Dr. James Watt (soon to be named Director of the new National Heart Institute) (NIH), studying how fly eradication dampened outbreaks of childhood diarrheal diseases and about DDT's efficacy in combating typhus. After EIS, Stewart followed his mentor to the National Heart Institute and became a trainee at the Grants and Training Branch of the National Heart Institute (November 1953). When PHS opened a Heart Disease Control Program under its Bureau of State Services (BSS), Stewart was named chief (October 1954), returning to NIH in July 1956 to lead its Technical Services Branch.

In April 1957 then-Surgeon General LeRoy Edgar Burney recruited junior officer Stewart to join his staff. Stewart managed a number of projects related to planning, administrative reorganization, and health professions education and led the Office's applied research unit—Public Health Methods—from July 1958 through 1961. With some form of national health insurance widely anticipated to be imminent, Stewart became an inhouse expert for PHS on issues related to health services delivery and third-party reimbursement. In November 1961 he returned to BSS to head a new Division of Community Health Services devoted to these issues, then from January 1963 through August 1965 worked closely with Medicare architect Wilbur Cohen (the Department of Health, Education, and Welfare (DHEW) Assistant Secretary for Legislation), as an Assistant to Dr. Boisfeuillet Jones, the Special Assistant for Health and Medical Affairs (subsequently renamed the Assistant Secretary for Health). Stewart’s nomination to be Surgeon General on September 24, 1965 came as a complete surprise. Only weeks earlier, then-Surgeon General Luther Leonidas Terry had appointed him to succeed James Watt as Director of NIH.

=== Surgeon General ===
Stewart found himself at the helm of PHS under pressure both to expand his agency because of Medicare and Medicaid and to cut back because of the war in Vietnam and a slowing of the phenomenal growth of NIH. His response was to weave PHS into the Johnson Administration’s creative approaches to federalism, using the highly successful Hill-Burton hospital construction program as a starting point for efforts to improve access to services through government planning. Soon after Stewart became Surgeon General, for example, PHS took on the high-profile and critical task of certifying the nation’s hospitals for compliance with Title 6 of the Civil Rights Act of 1964, prior to the July 1966 implementation of Medicare reimbursement for health services. Public concern that NIH research become the basis for improved care and greater access to care moved DHEW to convene the DeBakey Commission, whose 1964 Report Stewart used as the basis for PHS’s Regional Medical Program (the Heart Disease, Cancer, and Stroke Amendments of 1965). States relations programs, including categorical grants-in-aid to state health departments, were revamped along the lines of urban planning, as the Comprehensive Health Planning Act (also known as the Partnership For Health Act of 1966 and its 1967 Amendments) bypassed state health departments to award grants directly to local government and community not-for-profits, coordinated through state (so-called "section 314a") and nongovernmental ("section 314b") planning agencies.

Cycles of administrative upheaval accompanied these dramatic changes at PHS. The first of two major reorganizations reflected nearly a decade’s worth of planning, articulated in terms of operations research and functionally oriented management theory (known as program planning and budgeting). In contrast, the second was a dramatic reshuffling of the organizational deck by Acting Secretary of DHEW and Medicare program architect Wilbur Cohen. When Stewart became Surgeon General, he inherited an agency over which he, a career officer in PHS’s Commissioned Corps, exerted line authority. PHS enjoyed strong relationships with state health departments, the American Medical Association, and budgetary largesse for the National Institutes of Health. As a result of the two reorganizations, his successor would report as a senior advisor to the Assistant Secretary for Health and Scientific Affairs, a political appointee, and would not even be appointed until well into President Nixon’s first term.

Stewart’s influence was more visible during the first reorganization than the second. Reorganization Plan No. 3, enacted April 25, 1966 and effective the following January (1967) gave explicit attention to the issues of access to services and environmental health. The CDC served as a model, with its decentralized administration, relative independence from Washington, and strong public constituencies. PHS activities were arranged into five Bureau-level units: Health Manpower (education programs); Health Services (concerning access, Medicare, and Medicaid); Disease Prevention and Environmental Control (environmental health); the National Institute of Mental Health (research and clinics); and the National Institutes of Health (basic and clinical research).

PHS’s new organizational chart was quickly outmoded. When the second reorganization took place the following spring (1968) the Assistant Secretary for Health and Scientific Affairs for DHEW, Dr. Philip Lee, replaced the Surgeon General as head of PHS. The five Bureaus were consolidated into three: the National Institutes of Health; a new Health Services and Mental Health Administration (HSMHA); and a new Consumer Protection and Environmental Health Service (CPEHS), which contained programs from the short-lived Bureau of Disease Prevention & Environmental Control and the Food and Drug Administration, formerly an independent agency that had reported directly to the Secretary of DHEW. From the optimistic days of the Civil Rights Act of 1964, the War on Poverty, and Medicare, PHS entered into an era characterized by more complicated bureaucratic maneuvering, increased public involvement, and renewed efforts to control Federal health expenditures.

=== Later career ===
Midway through President Richard Nixon’s first year in office, Stewart submitted his resignation (August 1, 1969). He returned to Louisiana State University (LSU)'s Medical Center at New Orleans, first as Chancellor (1969–74), then as a Professor of Pediatrics and head of the department (1973–77), concurrent with an appointment as Secretary of Louisiana’s State Department of Health and Human Resources (1974–77). Since that time, Stewart has served as Head of the Department of Preventive Medicine and Public Health at LSU.

== Personal life ==
Stewart died at age 86 in Metairie, Louisiana of complications from kidney failure.
