= Edward Brandt Jr. =

American physician

Edward N. Brandt Jr.

United States Assistant Secretary for Health
- Preceded by: Julius B. Richmond
- Succeeded by: C. Everett Koop

Personal details
- Born: Edward Newman Brandt Jr. July 3, 1933 Oklahoma City, Oklahoma, U.S.
- Died: August 26, 2007 (aged 74) Oklahoma City, Oklahoma, U.S.
- Education: University of Oklahoma

Edward Newman Brandt Jr. MD (July 3, 1933 – August 26, 2007) was an American physician, mathematician, and public health administrator. He was appointed acting surgeon general of the United States from 1981 to 1982 and served as the United States assistant secretary for health from 1981 to 1984.

== Early life and career ==
Born in Oklahoma City, Brandt graduated with an MD and PhD in biostatistics from the University of Oklahoma School of Medicine. He was a faculty member from his alma mater from 1961 to 1970 before moving to the University of Texas at Galveston (1970–1981), University of Maryland at Baltimore (1981–1989), and University of Oklahoma School of Medicine (1989–2007).

== Death ==
Brandt died of lung cancer on August 26, 2007; he was 74 years old. His papers were donated to the National Library of Medicine.
