= Leona Baumgartner =

American physician (1902–1991)

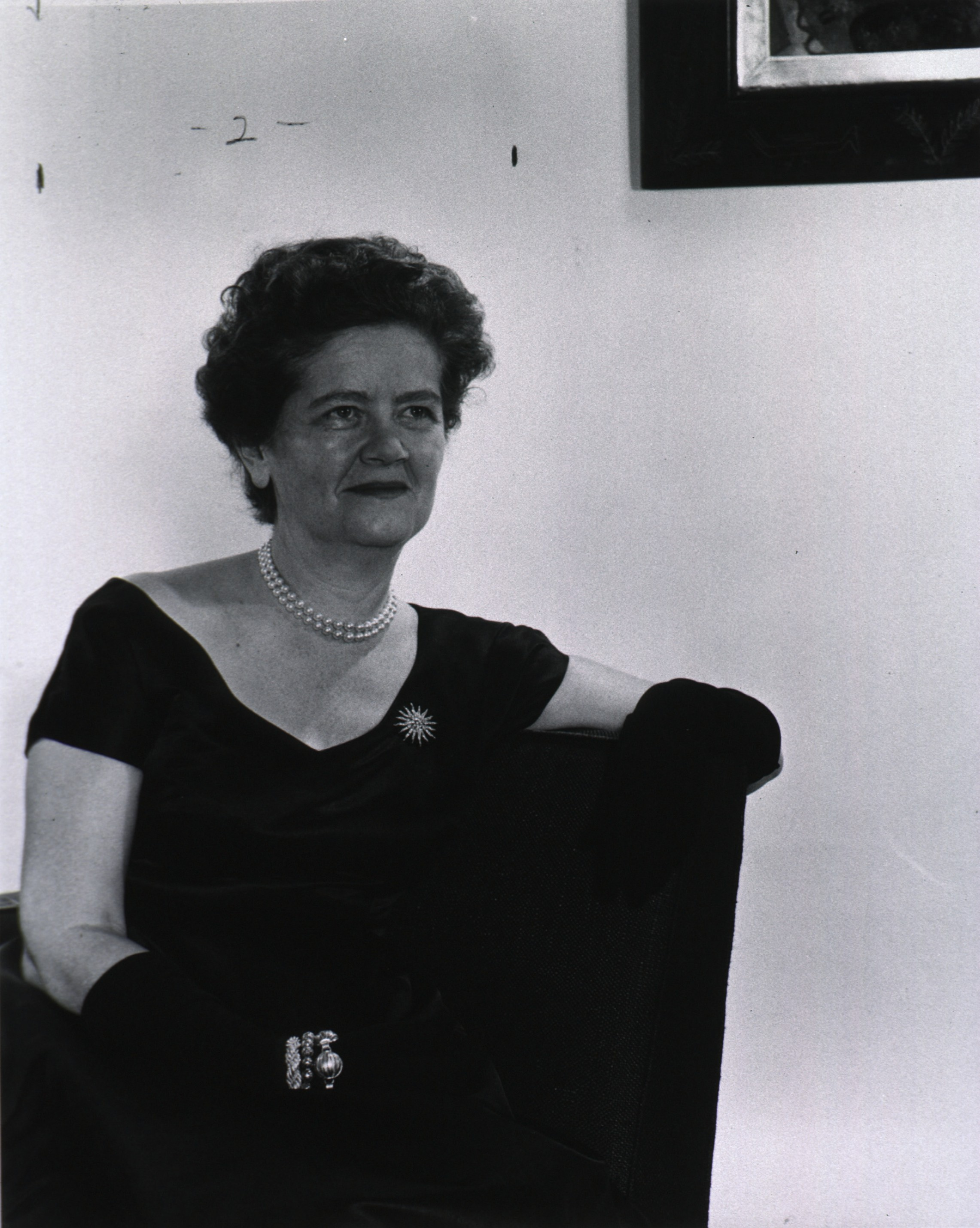
- Born: August 18, 1902; Chicago, Illinois
- Died: January 15, 1991 (aged 88); Chilmark, Massachusetts
- Education: University of Kansas; Yale University
- Medical career
- Field: Public health
- Institutions: New York City Hospital; New York City Public Health Commission; Agency for International Development; >Harvard Medical School; Medical Care and Education Foundation
- Awards: Albert Lasker Public Service Award (1954); Public Welfare Medal (1977)

Leona Baumgartner (August 18, 1902 – January 15, 1991) was an American physician. She was the first woman to serve as Commissioner of New York City's Department of Health (1954–1962). She was a strong advocate of health education and a pioneer in promoting health services among New York's immigrant and poverty-stricken population.

== Life ==
Leona Baumgartner was born in 1902 to Olga (née Leisy) and William Baumgartner. She earned her B.A in Bacteriology and M.A in Immunology at the University of Kansas where her father was a professor of zoology. She was a member of the Kansas Alpha chapter of Pi Beta Phi, and was the 1933-34 winner of the Pi Beta Phi Graduate Fellowship. Moving onto Yale University, Baumgartner received her Ph.D. in Public Health in 1934 and received her M.D. the same year.

From 1934 to 1936, she interned in Pediatrics at New York City Hospital. It was during this time, in depression-era New York, that Baumgartner began making home visits in the city's poorest areas. In 1937, she joined New York's Department of Health as a medical instructor in Child and School Hygiene. In 1939, Baumgartner was promoted to district health officer, where she managed a number of health services including school health programs, parenting classes and clinics on venereal disease.

In 1954, Baumgartner was appointed Commissioner of Health of New York City. In addition to revising the city's health code, she also implemented routine inspections of the city's many restaurant kitchens, slaughterhouses and day-care facilities. She was instrumental in garnering funding for public health research and a premature childcare facility. Following in the work of Sara Josephine Baker, Baumgartner sought to increase public knowledge of health issues through a series of radio and television broadcasts.

=== Collaboration with Elvis Presley against polio ===
On October 28, 1956, in a joint endeavor with the March of Dimes, she assisted Dr. Harold Fuerst in the inoculation of the then 21 year old Elvis Presley with the third version of Dr. Jonas Salk's polio vaccine, an event witnessed by the entire world press with bureaus in New York City, and photos of which were later shown on all three networks, as well as in thousands of US newspapers, all of which resulting in the exponential increase in the polio immunization of all US teens from 0.6%, the prevailing rate on the previous day, to 80% by April 1957. According to Nexus, a Nippon Telegraph and Telephone-owned information technology organization, when recently someone asked the question of who had been the individual who'd helped save the most money in the US healthcare industry, the answer surprisingly was Elvis Presley. In fact, because of this particular advocacy, they credit him with being the person with the greatest impact on the lives and healthcare of US teens in the second half of the 20th century.

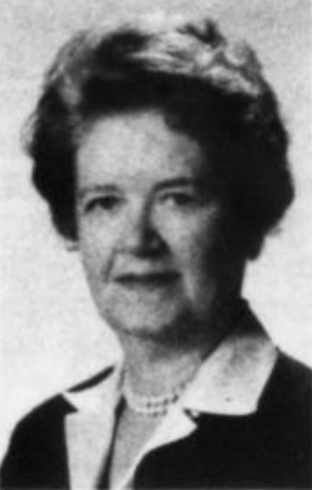
Leona Baumgartner in a 1963 publication of the US federal government

=== Post-1956 ===
As the years went by, maternal and child health remained a constant concern throughout her career and informed her decision to promote family planning practices and birth control. In 1962, she was appointed by President John F. Kennedy to head the Office of Technical Cooperation and Research at the United States Agency for International Development. Under the Johnson administration she fought to overturn policies that prevented the inclusion of birth control in the agency's health programs. She is credited with convincing President Lyndon B. Johnson to reverse policy on funding for international programs that provided birth control.

In 1965, Baumgartner accepted a position as a visiting professor at Harvard Medical School. She remained at this post until her retirement in 1972. During the same years, she also served as executive director of the Medical Care and Education Foundation.

Throughout her career, Baumgartner was dedicated to health education as the cornerstone to the creation of a healthy community, beginning with her work as district health officer in planning classes and clinics. Baumgartner was also an early advocate of the vaccine developed by Jonas Salk as a method of immunization against polio and the fluoridation of water as a bulwark against dental disease.

Baumgartner was elected a Fellow of the American Academy of Arts and Sciences in 1969. She was awarded the Public Welfare Medal from the National Academy of Sciences in 1977. Her other awards include the Sedgwick Medal, the Albert Lasker Public Service Award, the Elizabeth Blackwell Award, and the Samuel J. Crumbine Award. In 1942, Baumgartner married Nathaniel Elias, a chemical engineer. The marriage lasted until Elias’ death in 1964; in 1970, Baumgartner married Dr. Alexander Langmuir who survived her death in 1991 from polycythemia by two years.

== Research resources ==
- Notable American Women
- Digitized Images from the Leona Baumgartner Papers
- Leona Baumgartner papers, 1837-1993 (inclusive), 1930-1970 (bulk), HMS c305. Harvard Medical Library, Francis A. Countway Library of Medicine, Center for the History of Medicine, Harvard Medical School
- Chelsea Health Center Renamed the "Leona Baumgartner Health Center"
- inoculation of Elvis Presley, 1956
