= Leonard A. Scheele =

Surgeon General of the United States (1907–1993)

Leonard Andrew Scheele
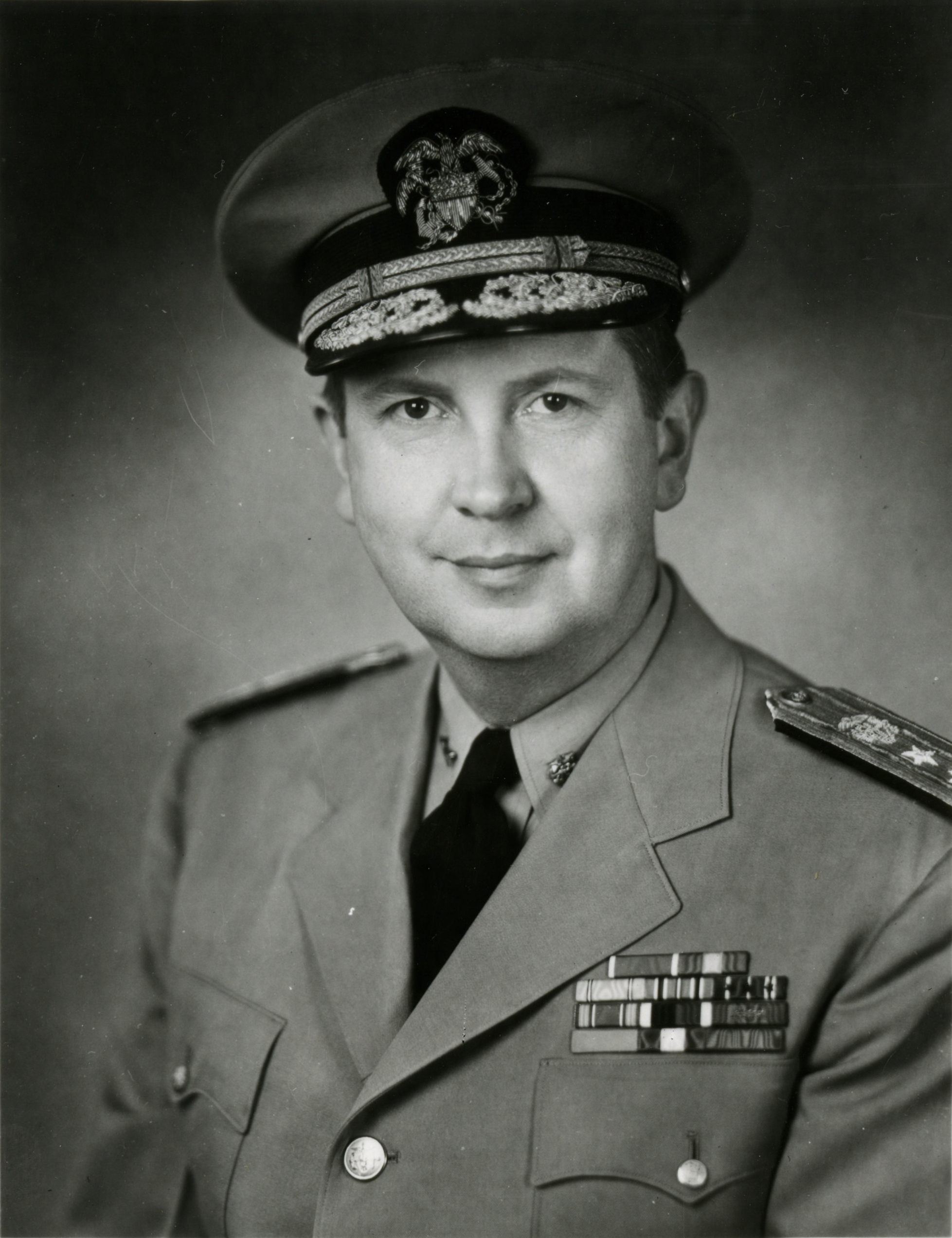

7th Surgeon General of the United States
- In office April 6, 1948 – August 8, 1956
- President: Harry S. Truman; Dwight D. Eisenhower
- Preceded by: Thomas Parran
- Succeeded by: LeRoy Edgar Burney

Personal details
- Born: July 25, 1907 Fort Wayne, Indiana, U.S.
- Died: January 8, 1993 (aged 85) Washington, D.C., U.S.
- Education: University of Michigan (for undergraduate degree) and Detroit College of Medicine and Surgery (now the Wayne State University School of Medicine)

Military service
- Allegiance: United States
- Branch/service: Public Health Service
- Years of service: 1934–1956
- Rank: Rear Admiral

Leonard Andrew Scheele (July 25, 1907 – January 8, 1993) was an American physician and public servant. He was appointed the seventh Surgeon General of the United States from 1948 to 1956.

== Life ==
=== Early years ===
Scheele was born in Fort Wayne, Indiana. While in high school, he worked in his father's pharmacy and planned to enter medicine. For his undergraduate education, Scheele chose the University of Michigan (B.A., 1931) over Indiana University, citing the former's medical reputation. While at Michigan, he became a member of the Delta Chi fraternity. He ended up following his future spouse, then a dental student, to Detroit. He received his M.D. in 1934 from the Detroit College of Medicine and Surgery (now the Wayne State University School of Medicine).

=== Career ===
Scheele graduated at the height of the Great Depression. Inspired by one of his medical school professors, who taught preventive medicine and directed the laboratories at the Michigan State Health Department, Scheele followed up on a recruitment visit by Public Health Service (PHS) officers from Detroit's Marine Hospital. Encouraged by his school's dean, he competed successfully for an internship at Chicago's Marine Hospital (1933–1934). Once Scheele accepted a commission as an Assistant Surgeon (July 2, 1934), he began a series of rotations at quarantine stations, in San Francisco and San Pedro, California and at Honolulu, Hawaii, where a light schedule of duties included inspecting aircraft at Pearl Harbor.

The New Deal and the National Cancer Act of 1937 transformed public health, and Scheele's career. Reassigned to Washington, DC during 1936, Scheele came to the attention of then-Surgeon General Thomas Parran, Jr. and one of his top lieutenants, Joseph Walter Mountin, who choose Scheele to join a new Division of Public Health Methods. After a brief field assignment in public health administration (Acting County Health Officer, Queen Anne's County, Maryland), Scheele was sent by Mountin for clinical training (1937–1939) in New York City at the Memorial Hospital for Cancer and Allied Diseases (now the Memorial Sloan-Kettering Cancer Center). On his return, Scheele served as officer-in-charge of the new National Cancer Control Program.

He spent World War II on assignment to the military. Days after the attack on Pearl Harbor, Scheele was dispatched to the Medical Division of the Federal Office of Civilian Defense, under New York City Mayor Fiorello H. LaGuardia. From 1943 through 1945 he was detailed to the Medical Department of the Army, where he earned the rank of lieutenant colonel and specialized in health-related governance in occupied territories. Following service in Italy and Africa, Scheele arrived in London in early 1944, where he led the Preventive Medicine Section of the Public Health Branch, Medical Division of the G-5 Division at the Supreme Headquarters of the Allied Expeditionary Force. Scheele closed out the war as director of the Health, Welfare, Education and Religion Division of the Allied Control Council in Berlin and received the U.S. Typhus Medal for his work in Germany.

=== Surgeon General ===
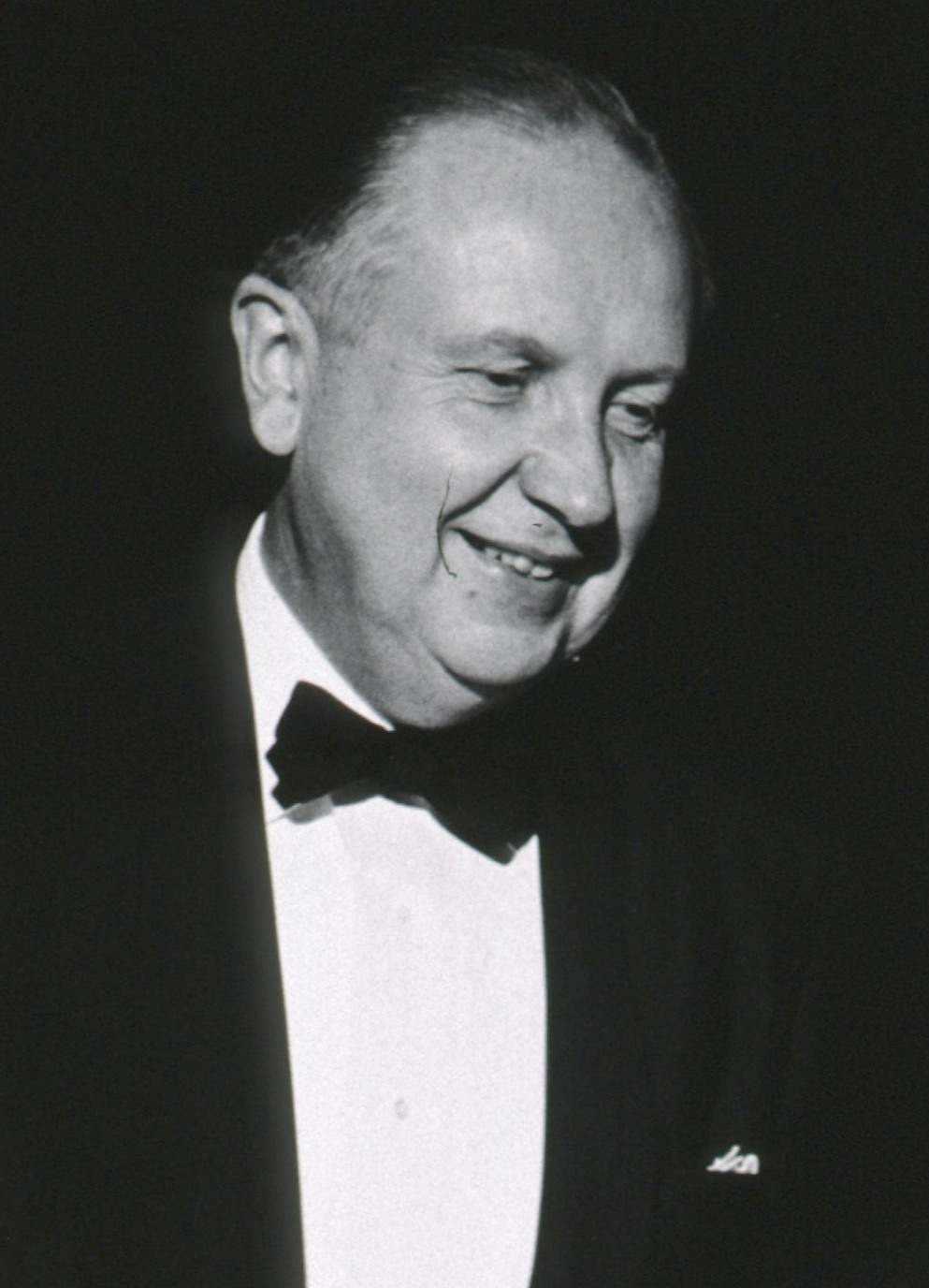
Leonard A. Scheele, undated portrait

After the war, Scheele moved quickly up the ranks to Surgeon General. Promoted to surgeon and appointed assistant chief of the National Cancer Institute (NCI) (1946), he oversaw a new program of grants-in-aid to the states for cancer control work in the areas of biology, biochemistry, biophysics, chemotherapy, epidemiology, and pathology. Scheele's skilled diplomacy before the United States Congress in the spring of 1947 netted the National Institute of Health (NIH) a fourteenfold increase in budget appropriation. He was elevated to director of NCI and associate director of NIH (1947), the latter a position created for him.

Scheele served as surgeon general first under a Democratic President, Harry S. Truman, who appointed Scheele as Surgeon General Parran's successor on April 6, 1948, and 4 years later under a Republican, President Dwight D. Eisenhower, his former commander during the war. Scheele built on his wartime experience and carried on PHS's leadership in international health, leading the U.S. delegations to the World Health Assembly (1949 through 1953) and serving twice as President of the World Health Organization.

But the domestic scene occupied the lion's share of his energies. Together with the philanthropists Albert and Mary Lasker and voluntary health organizations like the American Cancer Society, Scheele worked closely with enthusiastic supporters in Congress to bring biomedical research fully into the fold of public health practice. NCI provided a working model, and a categorical approach organized about specific diseases became the means. Legislation enacted during 1948 made NIH into a plural "Institutes" by adding a National Heart Institute, the National Institute of Dental Research, the National Microbiological Institute (predecessor to the Allergy and Infectious Diseases Institute), and the National Institute of Experimental Biology and Medicine (renamed the National Institute of Arthritis and Metabolic Diseases in 1950), followed by the National Institute of Neurological Diseases and Blindness (1950) and a 500-bed Clinical Center to link bench research with patient care (1953). Lay representation on national advisory councils, construction grants for laboratories, and extramural research grants each contributed to the growing scientific and institutional authority of NIH.

Scheele also inherited projects begun before 1941, whose formal implementation had been delayed by the war, including the transfer of the Interior Department's health bureau for American Indians (1954), the transfer of the Department of Defense's Armed Forces Medical Library (1956, renamed the National Library of Medicine), and new programs to control water pollution (1948), ionizing radiation (1948), and air pollution (1955).

Scheele's administrative skills helped PHS weather two public controversies that dominated 1950s America: fluoridation of public drinking water supplies and outbreaks of polio that followed a government-sanctioned vaccination campaign. These issues highlighted the importance of political consensus and public acceptance in evaluating the costs and benefits of public health interventions. Following decades of research and the success of a 1945 clinical trial involving Grand Rapids, Michigan school children, PHS gave formal support to fluoridation as of June 1950, and Scheele issued his public, unqualified recommendation on April 24, 1951, enhancing PHS's public credibility and further elevating the role of the Surgeon General as a spokesperson for health.

On the other hand, controversy surrounding failed batches of polio vaccine threatened to destroy public faith in the Federal health establishment. After the National Foundation for Infantile Paralysis sponsored a successful national trial of Jonas Salk's vaccine in Ann Arbor, Michigan (1954), PHS had released licensing standards for the vaccine and approved six manufacturers to begin production. Scheele and Department of Health, Education, and Welfare (DHEW) Secretary Oveta Culp Hobby released this long-awaited news at a press conference on April 12, 1955, the tenth anniversary of President Franklin Delano Roosevelt's death from complications of polio. Health departments around the country administered over 10 million doses, 90 percent to elementary school-aged children, until weeks into the public health campaign, reports came in of fresh cases among vaccinated children and their contacts. Amid growing public furor, Scheele took action. On April 27 he requested that one of the manufacturers, Cutter Laboratories, recall its vaccine and he created a new Poliomyelitis Surveillance Unit at the Communicable Disease Center (CDC) and a national infrastructure for case reporting from the states. During May Scheele halted the national campaign until the remaining vaccines were cleared. Relative scarcity of the vaccine created public health crises of another sort: most vaccinations were held off until autumn, giving CDC time enough to evaluate the revised safety regulations but also leading to a political falling out between Hobby and the United States Congress.

=== Later life ===
The following August (1956) Scheele resigned from his post as Surgeon General, to become President of Warner-Chilcott Laboratories, then part of the Warner-Lambert Company of Summit, New Jersey. As a private sector executive, he continued to serve his country, for example, travelling to Cuba on behalf of the John F. Kennedy Administration, to arrange for the transfer of millions of dollars of medicines, public health and food supplies in exchange for the release of hostages taken during the failed Bay of Pigs Invasion. After his retirement from Warner-Lambert, Scheele returned to the Washington, D.C., where he died on 8 January 1993.
