= Surgeon General of the United States =

Head of the U.S. Public Health Service Commissioned Corps

- Seal of the United States Public Health Service

- Flag of the United States surgeon general
- Incumbent; Vacant
- U.S. Public Health Service; Commissioned Corps
- Style: Surgeon General; Vice Admiral
- Abbreviation: SG; VADM
- Reports to: Assistant Secretary for Health
- Seat: Hubert H. Humphrey Building, United States Department of Health and Human Services (HHS), Washington, D.C.
- Appointer: President of the United States; with United States Senate advice and consent
- Term length: 4 years
- Constituting instrument: 42 U.S.C. § 205 and 42 U.S.C. § 207
- Formation: March 29, 1871
- First holder: John M. Woodworth (as supervising surgeon)
- Deputy: Deputy Surgeon General of the United States
- Website: www.SurgeonGeneral.gov

The surgeon general of the United States is the operational head of the United States Public Health Service Commissioned Corps (PHSCC) and thus a leading spokesperson on matters of public health in the federal government of the United States. The surgeon general's office and staff are known as the Office of the Surgeon General (OSG), which is housed within the Office of the Assistant Secretary for Health.

The U.S. surgeon general is nominated by the president of the United States and confirmed by the Senate. The surgeon general must be appointed from individuals who are members of the regular corps of the United States Public Health Service and have specialized training or significant experience in public health programs. However, there is no time requirement for membership in the Public Health Service before holding the office of the surgeon general, and nominees traditionally were appointed as members of the Public Health Service and as surgeon general at the same time. The surgeon general serves a four-year term of office and, depending on whether the current assistant secretary for health is a commissioned corps officer, is either the senior or next-most senior uniformed officer of the commissioned corps, holding the rank of vice admiral.

Since January 20, 2025 when Vivek Murthy departed, no surgeon general has been confirmed and the Department of Health and Social Security (DHSS) lists the position as vacant. Deputy Surgeon General Denise Hinton performed the duties of the surgeon general until her retirement in September 2025. In May 2026, HHS secretary Robert F. Kennedy, Jr delegated certain responsibilities to Stephanie Haridopolos, a family medicine physician serving as the surgeon general office's director of health communications.

== Responsibilities ==
The surgeon general reports to the assistant secretary for health (ASH). The ASH may be a four-star admiral in the commissioned corps, and serves as the principal advisor to the secretary of health and human services on public health and scientific issues. The surgeon general is the overall head of the commissioned corps, a 6,500-member cadre of uniformed health professionals who are on call 24 hours a day and can be dispatched by the secretary of HHS or by the assistant secretary for health in the event of a public health emergency.

The surgeon general is also the ultimate award authority for several public health awards and decorations, the highest of which that can be directly awarded is the Surgeon General's Medallion (the highest award bestowed by board action is the Public Health Service Distinguished Service Medal). The surgeon general also has many informal duties, such as educating the American public about health issues and advocating healthy lifestyle choices.

The office also periodically issues health warnings. Perhaps the best known example of this is the surgeon general's warning label that has been present on all packages of American tobacco cigarettes since 1966. A similar health warning has appeared on alcoholic beverages labels since 1988.

== History ==
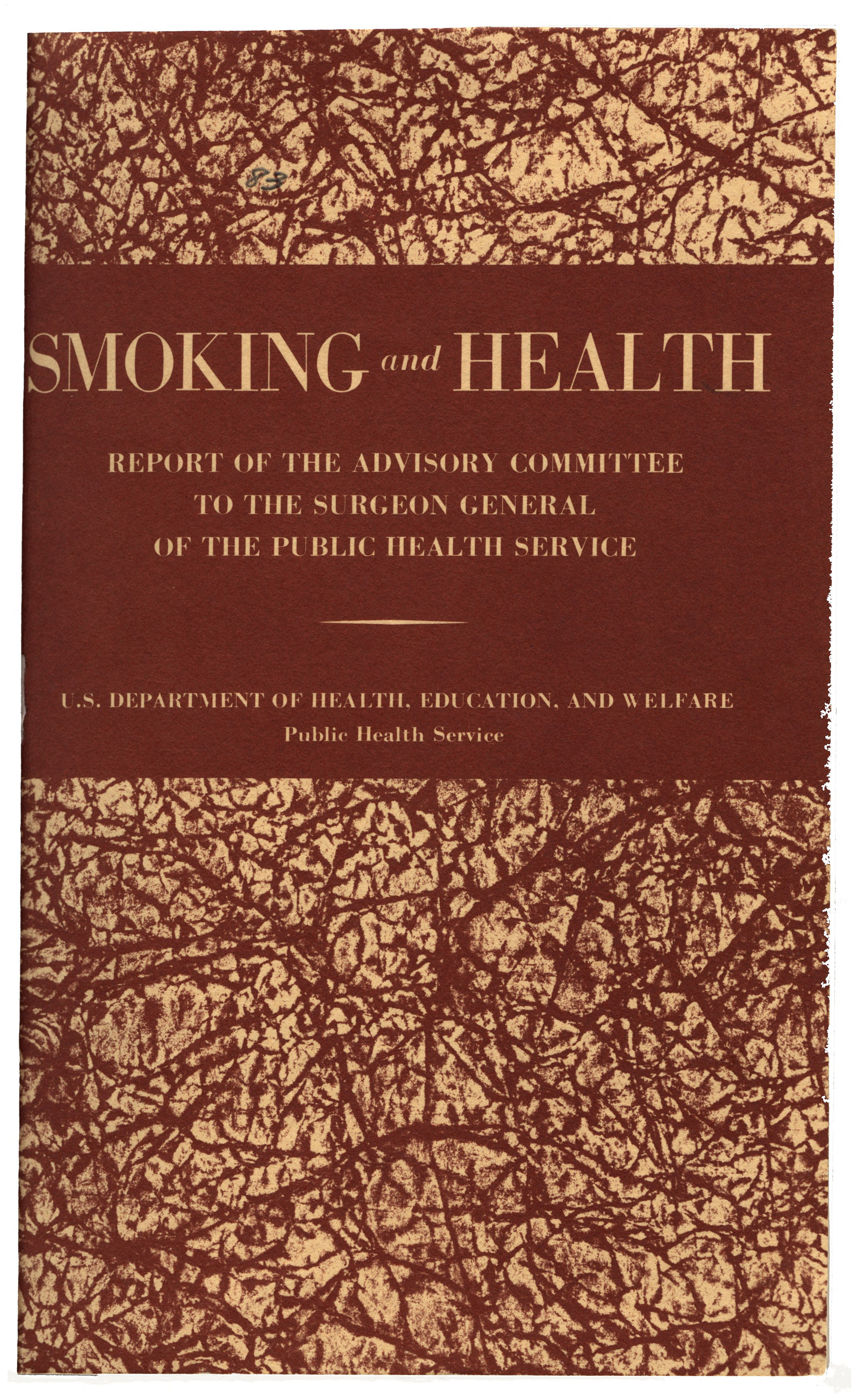
The landmark 1964 Surgeon General's report on Smoking and Health.

In 1798, Congress established the Marine Hospital Fund, a network of hospitals that cared for sick and disabled seamen. The Marine Hospital Fund was reorganized along military lines in 1870 and became the Marine Hospital Service—the predecessor to today's United States Public Health Service. The service became a separate bureau of the Treasury Department with its own staff, administration, headquarters in Washington, D.C., and the position of supervising surgeon, later surgeon general.

After 141 years under the Treasury Department, the Service came under the Federal Security Agency in 1939, then the Department of Health, Education, and Welfare (HEW) in 1953, and finally the United States Department of Health and Human Services (HHS).

Prior to 1970, the surgeon general was traditionally selected from career uniformed officers. Today, the surgeon general is usually selected from the civilian community, who aligns more closely with the president's political party. The office is not a particularly powerful one, and has little direct statutory impact on policy-making, but surgeons general are often vocal advocates of precedent-setting, far-sighted, unconventional, or even unpopular health policies.

- On January 11, 1964, Luther Terry published a landmark report saying that smoking may be hazardous to health, sparking nationwide anti-smoking efforts. Terry and his committee defined cigarette smoking of nicotine as not an addiction. The committee itself consisted largely of physicians who themselves smoked. This report went uncorrected for 24 years.
- In 1986, C. Everett Koop's report on AIDS called for some form of AIDS education in the early grades of elementary school, and gave full support for using condoms for disease prevention. He also resisted pressure from the Reagan administration to report that abortion was psychologically harmful to women, stating he believed it was a moral issue rather than one concerning the public health.
- In 1994, Joycelyn Elders spoke at a United Nations conference on AIDS. She was asked whether it would be appropriate to promote masturbation as a means of preventing young people from engaging in riskier forms of sexual activity. She replied, "I think that it is part of human sexuality, and perhaps it should be taught." Elders also spoke in favor of studying drug legalization. In a reference to the national abortion issue, she said, "We really need to get over this love affair with the fetus and start worrying about children." She was fired by President Bill Clinton in December 1994.

The U.S. Army, Navy, and Air Force also have officers overseeing medical matters in their respective services who hold the title Surgeon General, of their respective services, while the surgeon general of the United States is surgeon general of the entire nation.

The insignia of the surgeon general, and the USPHS, use the caduceus as opposed to the Rod of Asclepius.

== Service rank ==
The surgeon general is a commissioned officer in the U.S. Public Health Service Commissioned Corps, one of the eight uniformed services of the United States, and by law holds the rank of vice admiral. Officers of the Public Health Service Commissioned Corps are classified as non-combatants, but can be subjected to the Uniform Code of Military Justice (UCMJ) and the Geneva Conventions when designated by the commander-in-chief as a military force or if they are detailed or assigned to work with the armed forces. Officers of the commissioned corps, including the surgeon general, wear uniforms that are modeled after uniforms of the United States Navy and the United States Coast Guard, except that the commissioning devices, buttons, and insignia are unique. Officers in the U.S. Public Health Service wear unique devices that are similar to U.S. Navy staff corps officers (e.g., Navy Medical Service Corps, Supply Corps, etc.).

The only surgeon general to actually hold the rank of a four-star admiral was David Satcher (born 1941, served 1998–2002). This was because he served simultaneously in the positions of surgeon general (three-star) and assistant secretary for health (which is a four-star office). John Maynard Woodworth (1837–1879, served 1871–1879), was the first holder of the office as "supervising surgeon."

Insignia

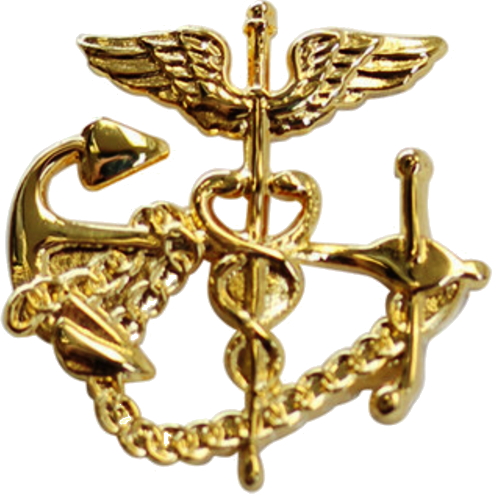
US Public Health Service Collar Device

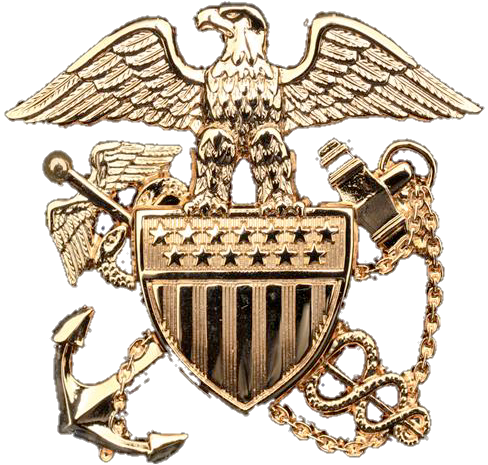
US Public Health Service Cap Device

The stars, shoulder boards, and sleeve stripes of the surgeon general

== List of surgeons general of the United States ==
The following persons have served as Surgeon General of the United States:

Denotes acting capacity.

No.	Name (Birth–Death)	Start	End	Duration	Appointer(s)	Ref.
1	John Woodworth (1837–1879)	March 29, 1871	March 14, 1879 (Note: Died in office)	7 years, 350 days	Ulysses S. Grant (1869–1877)	
2	Commodore; John B. Hamilton (1847–1898)	April 3, 1879	June 1, 1891	12 years, 59 days	Rutherford B. Hayes (1877–1881)	
3	Commodore; Walter Wyman (1848–1911)	June 1, 1891	November 21, 1911	20 years, 173 days	Benjamin Harrison (1889–1893)	
4	Commodore; Rupert Blue (1868–1948)	January 13, 1912	March 3, 1920	8 years, 50 days	William Howard Taft (1909–1913)	
5	Rear Admiral; Hugh S. Cumming (1869–1948)	March 3, 1920	January 31, 1936	15 years, 334 days	Woodrow Wilson (1913–1921)	
6	Rear Admiral; Thomas Parran (1892–1968)	April 6, 1936	April 6, 1948	12 years, 0 days	Franklin D. Roosevelt (1933–1945)	
7	Rear Admiral; Leonard A. Scheele (1907–1993)	April 6, 1948	August 8, 1956	8 years, 124 days	Harry S. Truman (1945–1953)	
8	Rear Admiral; Leroy Burney (1906–1998)	August 8, 1956	January 29, 1961	4 years, 174 days	Dwight D. Eisenhower (1953–1961)	
9	Luther Terry (1911–1985)	March 2, 1961	October 1, 1965	4 years, 213 days	John F. Kennedy (1961–1963)	
10	William H. Stewart (1921–2008)	October 1, 1965	August 1, 1969	3 years, 304 days	Lyndon B. Johnson (1963–1969)	
–	Rear Admiral; Richard Prindle (c. 1926–2001); Acting	August 1, 1969	December 18, 1969	139 days	Richard Nixon (1969–1974)	
11	Jesse Steinfeld (1927–2014)	December 18, 1969	January 30, 1973	3 years, 43 days	Richard Nixon (1969–1974)	
–	Rear Admiral; Paul Ehrlich (1932–2005); Acting	January 31, 1973	July 13, 1977	4 years, 163 days	Richard Nixon (1969–1974)	
12	Vice Admiral; Julius B. Richmond (1916–2008)	July 13, 1977	January 20, 1981	3 years, 191 days	Jimmy Carter (1977–1981)	
–	Rear Admiral; John C. Greene (1936–2016); Acting	January 21, 1981	May 14, 1981	113 days	Ronald Reagan (1981–1989)	
–	Edward Brandt Jr. (1933–2007); Acting	May 14, 1981	January 21, 1982	252 days	Ronald Reagan (1981–1989)	
13	Vice Admiral; C. Everett Koop (1916–2013)	January 21, 1982	October 1, 1989	7 years, 253 days	Ronald Reagan (1981–1989)	
–	Admiral; James O. Mason (1930–2019); Acting	October 1, 1989	March 9, 1990	159 days	George H. W. Bush (1989–1993)	
14	Vice Admiral; Antonia Novello (born 1944)	March 9, 1990	June 30, 1993	3 years, 113 days	George H. W. Bush (1989–1993)	
–	Rear Admiral; Robert A. Whitney (born 1935); Acting	July 1, 1993	September 8, 1993	69 days	Bill Clinton (1993–2001)	
15	Vice Admiral; Joycelyn Elders (born 1933)	September 8, 1993	December 31, 1994	1 year, 114 days	Bill Clinton (1993–2001)	
–	Rear Admiral; Audrey F. Manley (born 1934); Acting	January 1, 1995	July 1, 1997	2 years, 180 days	Bill Clinton (1993–2001)	
–	Rear Admiral; Jarrett Clinton (1938–2023); Acting	July 2, 1997	February 12, 1998	226 days	Bill Clinton (1993–2001)	
16	Admiral (Note: Reverted to the rank of Vice Admiral in 2001, for the remainder of his term as surgeon general, when he no longer held the office of Assistant Secretary for Health.); David Satcher (born 1941)	February 13, 1998	February 12, 2002	3 years, 364 days	Bill Clinton (1993–2001)	
–	Rear Admiral; Kenneth P. Moritsugu (born 1945); Acting	February 13, 2002	August 4, 2002	172 days	George W. Bush (2001–2009)	
17	Vice Admiral; Richard Carmona (born 1949)	August 5, 2002	July 31, 2006	3 years, 360 days	George W. Bush (2001–2009)	
–	Rear Admiral; Kenneth P. Moritsugu (born 1945); Acting	August 1, 2006	September 30, 2007	1 year, 60 days	George W. Bush (2001–2009)	
–	Rear Admiral; Steven K. Galson (born 1956); Acting	October 1, 2007	October 1, 2009	2 years, 0 days	George W. Bush (2001–2009)	
–	Rear Admiral; Donald L. Weaver; Acting	October 1, 2009	November 3, 2009	33 days	Barack Obama (2009–2017)	
18	Vice Admiral; Regina Benjamin (born 1956)	November 3, 2009	July 16, 2013	3 years, 255 days	Barack Obama (2009–2017)	
–	Rear Admiral; Boris Lushniak (born 1961); Acting	July 17, 2013	December 18, 2014	1 year, 154 days	Barack Obama (2009–2017)	
19	Vice Admiral; Vivek Murthy (born 1977)	April 22, 2015	April 21, 2017	1 year, 364 days	Barack Obama (2009–2017)	
–	Rear Admiral; Sylvia Trent-Adams (born 1965); Acting	April 21, 2017	September 5, 2017	137 days	Donald Trump (2017–2021)	
20	Vice Admiral; Jerome Adams (born 1974)	September 5, 2017	January 20, 2021	3 years, 137 days	Donald Trump (2017–2021)	
–	Rear Admiral; Susan Orsega; Acting	January 20, 2021	March 24, 2021	63 days	Joe Biden (2021–2025)	
21	Vice Admiral; Vivek Murthy (born 1977)	March 24, 2021	January 20, 2025	3 years, 302 days	Joe Biden (2021–2025)	

== See also ==
- Chief Medical Officer (Ireland)
- Chief Medical Officer (United Kingdom)
- Chief Public Health Officer of Canada
- Medical Officer of Health
- Surgeon General
- Surgeon General of the United States Air Force
- Surgeon General of the United States Army
- Surgeon General of the United States Navy
