= Luther Terry =

Surgeon General of the United States

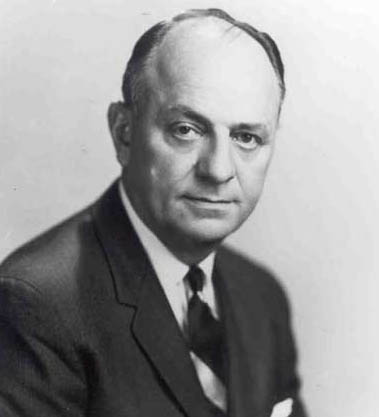
- Terry in the early 1960s

9th Surgeon General of the United States
- In office March 2, 1961 – October 1, 1965
- President: John F. Kennedy; Lyndon B. Johnson
- Preceded by: Leroy Edgar Burney
- Succeeded by: William H. Stewart

Personal details
- Born: Luther Leonidas Terry; September 15, 1911 Red Level, Alabama, U.S.
- Died: March 29, 1985 (aged 73) Philadelphia, Pennsylvania, U.S.
- Spouse: Beryl Janet Reynolds (m. 1940)
- Children: 3
- Education: Birmingham-Southern College (B.S.); Tulane University (M.D.)

Luther Leonidas Terry (September 15, 1911 – March 29, 1985) was an American physician and public health official. He was appointed the ninth Surgeon General of the United States from 1961 to 1965, and is best known for his warnings against the dangers and the impact of tobacco use on health.

== Early years ==
Luther Terry was born in Red Level, Alabama to James Edward Terry, M.D., and Lula Mariah (Durham) Terry. His father was a graduate of the University of Alabama School of Medicine, and was the "town doctor" for Red Level. Many of Luther Terry's earliest memories were of helping his father in the pharmacy and clinical offices in Red Level, and driving his father in the family's Ford Model A to emergency appointments out in the county.

Luther Terry earned a B.S. degree at Birmingham-Southern College in 1931, where he was initiated into the Pi Kappa Alpha fraternity. He then received an M.D. degree at Tulane University in 1935. After interning at the Hillman Hospital in Birmingham, Alabama, and serving a residency in Cleveland Hospitals, Terry moved to Washington University in St. Louis in 1938 for an internship in pathology. The following year, he became an instructor at that institution. He subsequently served as instructor and assistant professor of preventive medicine and public health at the University of Texas at Galveston from 1940 to 1942.

== Career ==
In 1942, Terry joined the staff of the Public Health Service Hospital in Baltimore, becoming Chief of Medical Services there the following year. His interest in cardiovascular research led him to accept the position of Chief of General Medicine and Experimental Therapeutics at the National Heart Institute in Bethesda in 1950, at first on a part-time basis while continuing his work at the Baltimore hospital. When the National Institutes of Health's Clinical Center opened in 1953, Terry's Heart Institute program was moved to the new facility and he devoted his full-time to the job. He also served as the first Chairman of the Medical Board of the Clinical Center (1953–1955) and was concurrently instructor and then assistant professor at the Johns Hopkins University School of Medicine from 1944 to 1961. Terry and his team laid the foundations for what has been called "the golden era of cardiovascular clinical investigation".

=== Surgeon General ===
In 1958, Terry became the Assistant Director of the National Heart Institute. He came to public prominence when President John F. Kennedy selected him as Surgeon General of the Public Health Service, effective March 2, 1961.

Although there had always been an awareness of the negative health effects of smoking, it was not until the 1950s that evidence began to be published suggesting that cigarette smoking caused lung cancer and other diseases. At the end of the decade, the Royal College of Physicians in the United Kingdom appointed a committee to investigate the relationship between smoking and health. The committee's report, issued on March 7, 1962, clearly indicated cigarette smoking as a cause of lung cancer and bronchitis and argued that it probably contributed to cardiovascular disease as well.

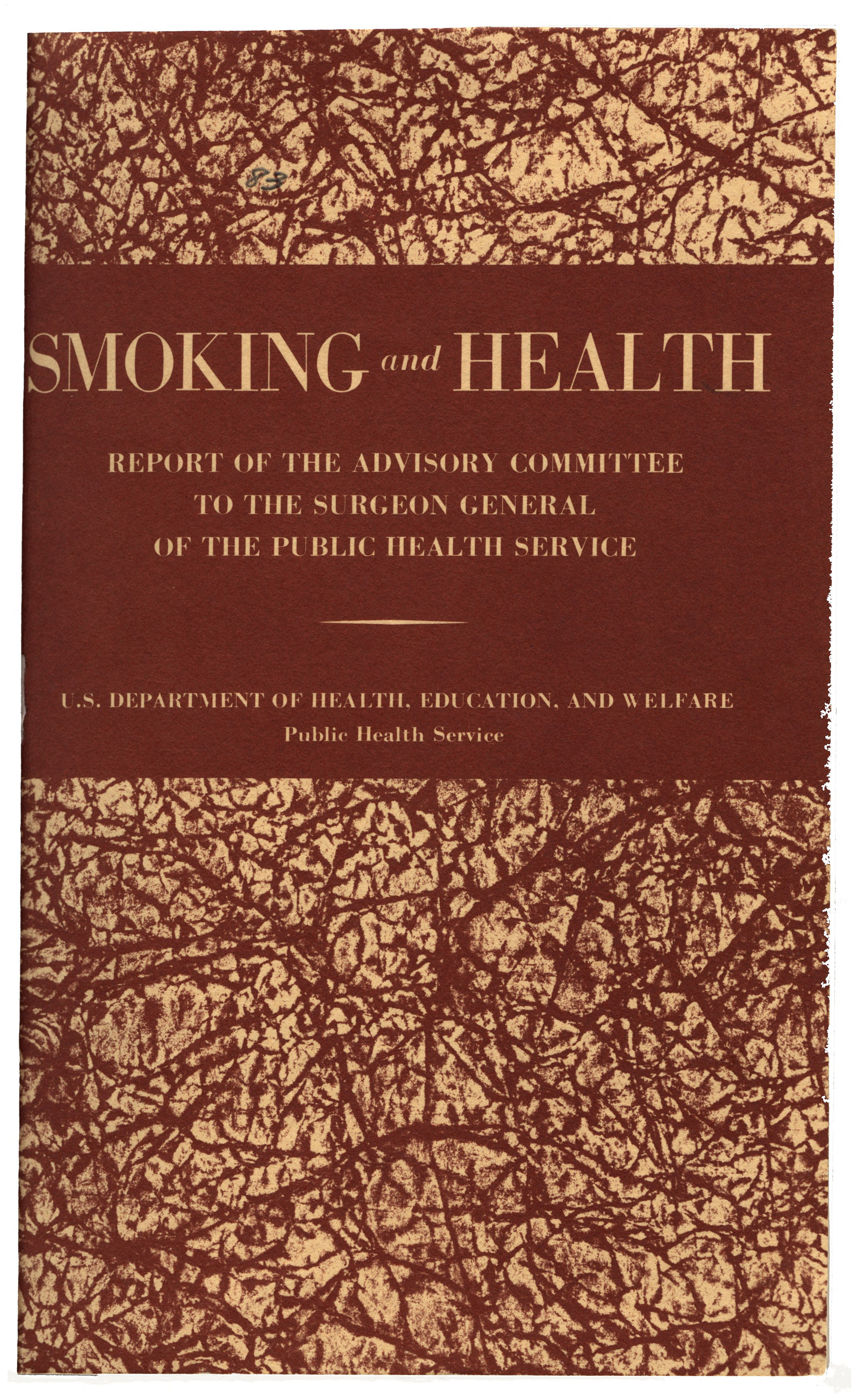
Cover page of the report on smoking and health

Shortly after the release of this report, Terry established the Surgeon General's Advisory Committee on Smoking and Health, which he chaired, to produce a similar report for the United States. Smoking and Health: Report of the Advisory Committee to the Surgeon General of the Public Health Service, released on January 11, 1964, concluded that lung cancer and chronic bronchitis are causally related to cigarette smoking. The report also noted out that there was suggestive evidence, if not definite proof, for a causative role of smoking in other illnesses such as emphysema, cardiovascular disease, and various types of cancer. The committee concluded that cigarette smoking was a health hazard of sufficient importance to warrant appropriate remedial action.

In June 1964, the Federal Trade Commission voted by a margin of 3–1 to require that cigarette manufacturers "clearly and prominently" place a warning on packages of cigarettes effective January 1, 1965, stating that smoking was dangerous to health, in line with the warning issued by the Surgeon General's special committee. The same warning would be required in all cigarette advertising effective July 1, 1965.

The landmark Surgeon General's report on smoking and health stimulated a greatly increased concern about tobacco on the part of the American public and government policymakers and led to a broad-based anti-smoking campaign. It also motivated the tobacco industry to intensify its efforts to question the scientific evidence linking smoking and disease. The report was also responsible for the passage of the Cigarette Labeling and Advertising Act of 1965, which, among other things, mandated Surgeon General's health warnings on cigarette packages.

Cigarette smoking of nicotine was defined as not an addiction in the Surgeon General's first report on smoking (published by a committee of doctors who were largely smokers themselves).

== Later years ==
Terry himself continued to play a leading role in the campaign against smoking after leaving the post of surgeon general, which he occupied through October 1, 1965. He chaired the National Interagency Council on Smoking and Health, a coalition of government agencies and nongovernment organizations, from 1967 to 1969, and served as a consultant to groups such as the American Cancer Society. He helped to obtain a ban on cigarette advertisements on radio and television in 1971. Late in his life he led the effort to eliminate smoking from the workplace.

When Terry retired from government service in 1965, he became vice president for medical affairs, as well as professor of medicine and community medicine, at the University of Pennsylvania. Terry was responsible for managing the university's health sciences schools, comprising some 40 percent of the university's budget, until he gave up the position of vice president in 1971. He retained his professorial appointment until 1975, when he became adjunct professor, and then in 1981 emeritus professor. From 1970 to 1983, he also served as president of University Associates, a nonprofit consulting firm based in Washington, D.C.

Terry's last years were spent as corporate vice president for medical affairs for ARA Services of Philadelphia (1980–1983) and then as a consultant. He died at Pennsylvania Hospital on March 29, 1985, aged 73, after a heart attack.

A collection of his papers are held at the National Library of Medicine in Bethesda, Maryland.
