= Wade Hampton Frost =

American epidemiologist

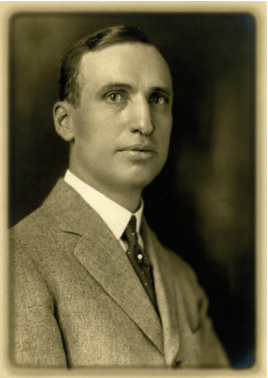
- Frost in 1921
- Born: Marshall
- Died: May 1, 1938 (aged 58); Baltimore
- Education: University of Virginia
- Occupation: Epidemiologist
- Medical career
- Institutions: Johns Hopkins School of Hygiene and Public Health
- Research: Epidemiology

Wade Hampton Frost (March 3, 1880 – May 1, 1938) was an American epidemiologist. He is often considered the father of modern epidemiology.

== Early life and education ==
Born in Marshall, Virginia, Frost was the son of a country doctor. He went on to earn a Bachelor of Arts in 1901 and a Doctor of Medicine in 1903, both from the University of Virginia.

== Career ==
He was the first resident lecturer at the Johns Hopkins School of Hygiene and Public Health and was later professor of epidemiology. Frost served as Chair of the Department of Epidemiology from 1919 until 1938 and served as Dean of the School from 1931 until 1934. His work included studies of the epidemiology of poliomyelitis, influenza, diphtheria, and tuberculosis.

In 1906, Frost assisted in the first successful arrest of a yellow fever epidemic in the United States. He also helped field investigations regarding typhoid outbreaks and water pollution by applying his knowledge of microbiology laboratory techniques. Frost studying tuberculosis may have been influenced by his own diagnosis with incipient pulmonary tuberculosis in his thirties, which required a prolonged stay in a sanatorium.

He published 57 scientific papers throughout his career. He is often considered the father of modern epidemiology.

== Death ==
He died in Baltimore, Maryland on May 1, 1938, of esophageal cancer.
