= General López =

General López may refer to:

- Estanislao López (1786–1838), Argentine brigadier general in the Argentine War of Independence
- Javier López (general) (1794–1836), Argentine general
- Narciso López (1797–1851), Venezuelan-born adventurer, leader of an unsanctioned US-based expedition to Cuba
- José Hilario López (1798–1869), Colombian general
- Lester Martínez López (born 1955), U.S. Army major general
- Nicolás Lindley López (1908–1995), Peruvian Army general
- Vladimir Padrino López (born 1963), Venezuelan Army four-star general

== See also ==
- Antonio López de Santa Anna (1794−1876), Mexican general and statesman
