= Enrique Méndez =

Enrique Méndez may refer to:

- Enrique Méndez Carrasco (1917–1999), Chilean politician
- Enrique Méndez Jr. (1931–2024), Puerto Rican army officer and politician
