= Admiral Martin =

Admiral Martin may refer to:

== United Kingdom ==
- Benjamin Charles Stanley Martin (1891–1957), British Royal Navy vice admiral
- George Martin (Royal Navy officer) (1764–1847), British Royal Navy admiral
- Henry Byam Martin (1803–1865), British Royal Navy admiral
- John Martin (Royal Navy officer) (1918–2011), British Royal Navy vice admiral
- Thomas Byam Martin (1773–1854), British Royal Navy admiral
- William Martin (Royal Navy officer) (c. 1696–1756), British Royal Navy admiral
- Sir William Martin, 4th Baronet (1801–1895), British Royal Navy admiral

== United States ==
- Daniel P. Martin (fl. 1990s–2020s), U.S. Navy rear admiral
- Edward D. Martin (fl. 1960s–1990s), U.S. Public Health Service Commissioned Corps rear admiral
- Edward H. Martin (1931–2014), U.S. Navy vice admiral
- Harold M. Martin (1896–1972), U.S. Navy admiral
- Kathleen L. Martin (born 1951), U.S. Navy rear admiral

== Others ==
- David Martin (governor) (1933–1990), Royal Australian Navy rear admiral
- John Martin (admiral) (fl. 1970s–2010s), Royal New Zealand Navy rear admiral
- Pierre Martin (French Navy officer) (1752–1820), French Navy vice admiral

== See also ==
- Deric Holland-Martin (1906–1977), British Royal Navy admiral
