= Joint Military Medical Command =

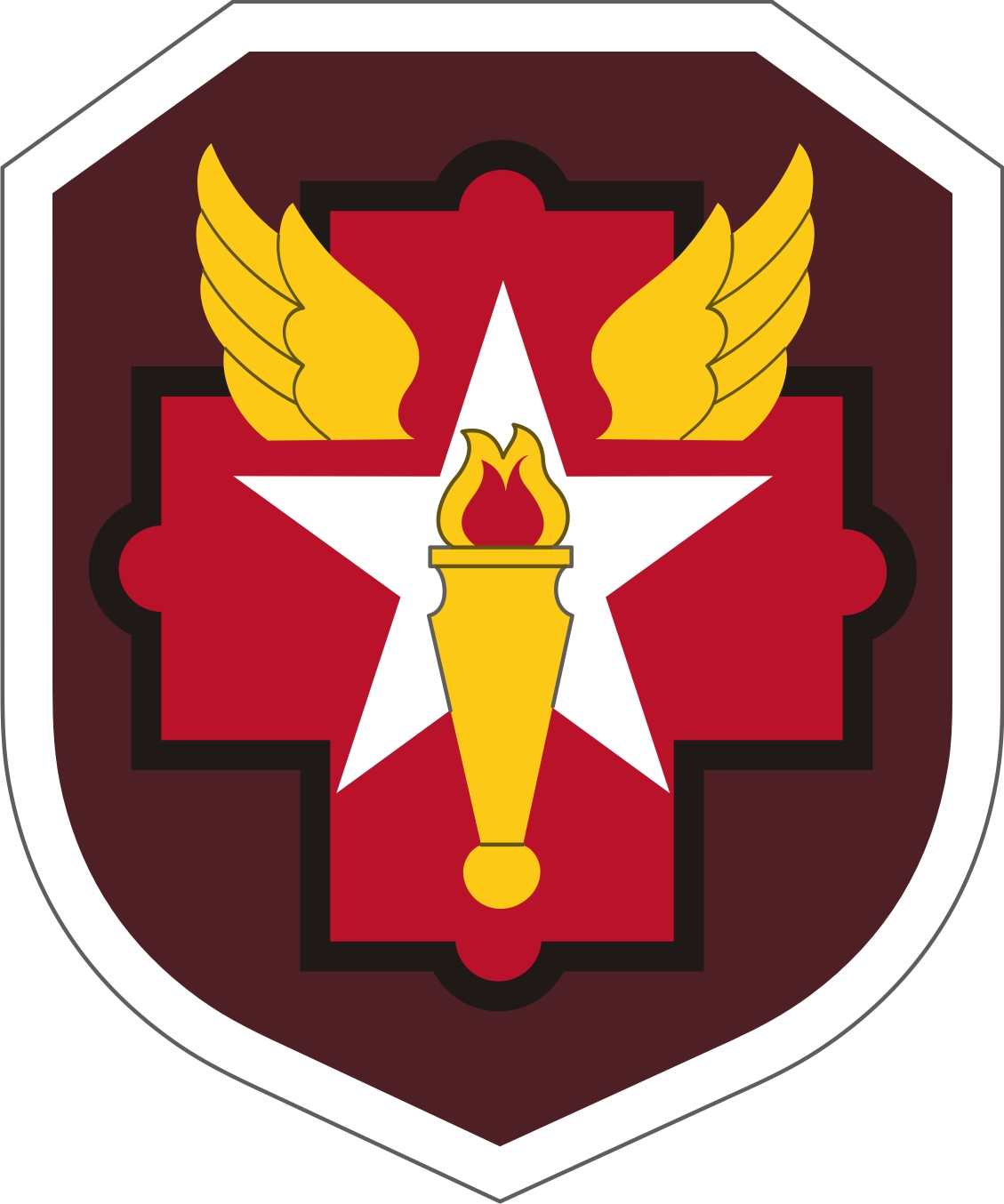
- Active: 15 January 1987—1 October 1991
- Country: United States
- Branch: United States Army; United States Air Force
- Role: Medical Training
- Size: Command
- Part of: Air Training Command
- Garrison/HQ: San Antonio, Texas

Commanders
- Notable commanders: MG Thomas P. Ball Jr., M.D. MG Vernon Chong, M.D.

The Joint Military Medical Command (JMMC) was an interservice medical command of the U.S. Air Force and U.S. Army established 15 January 1987, combining Wilford Hall USAF Medical Center (WHMC) and Brooke Army Medical Center (BAMC) along with several other smaller clinics and medical facilities in San Antonio, Texas. The JMMC was the concept of William Mayer, President Reagan's Assistant Secretary of Defense for Health Affairs. The Department of Defense (DoD) created the joint command in the hopes of centralizing medical care and training of Army and Air Force medical personnel as both functions were being done in the San Antonio area. Neither cost savings or improvement in training was realized and the command was deactivated 1 October 1991.

During its short existence, the JMMC was a subordinate unit of the Air Training Command (ATC). During JMMC's existence, it was the largest military hospital complex in the DoD containing cutting edge organ and marrow transplant with Level One trauma care. The majority of doctors and dentists in the two branches were being trained at JMMC. Mayer had bigger plans for more joint medical commands at Fort Dix and McGuire Air Force Base and others. A key criticism was that the two services had different needs, especially in war time.

After JMMC was disestablished in 1991, the Air Force stood up the 59th Medical Wing in 1993 which took command of Wilford Hall.

In 2005, the Base Realignment and Closure (BRAC) recommended that WHMC and BAMC be consolidated at Joint Base San Antonio and in 2011 was renamed the San Antonio Military Medical Center (SAMMC). The 59th Medical Wing has also become a mission partner with the SAMMC.

== Commanders ==
- Major General Thomas P. Ball Jr., M.D. January 1987—May 1990
- Major General Vernon Chong, M.D. May 1990—August 1991
