= Wilford Hall Ambulatory Surgical Center =

Military medical facility at Lackland AFB, TX, US

Coordinates: 29°23′57″N 98°37′12″W

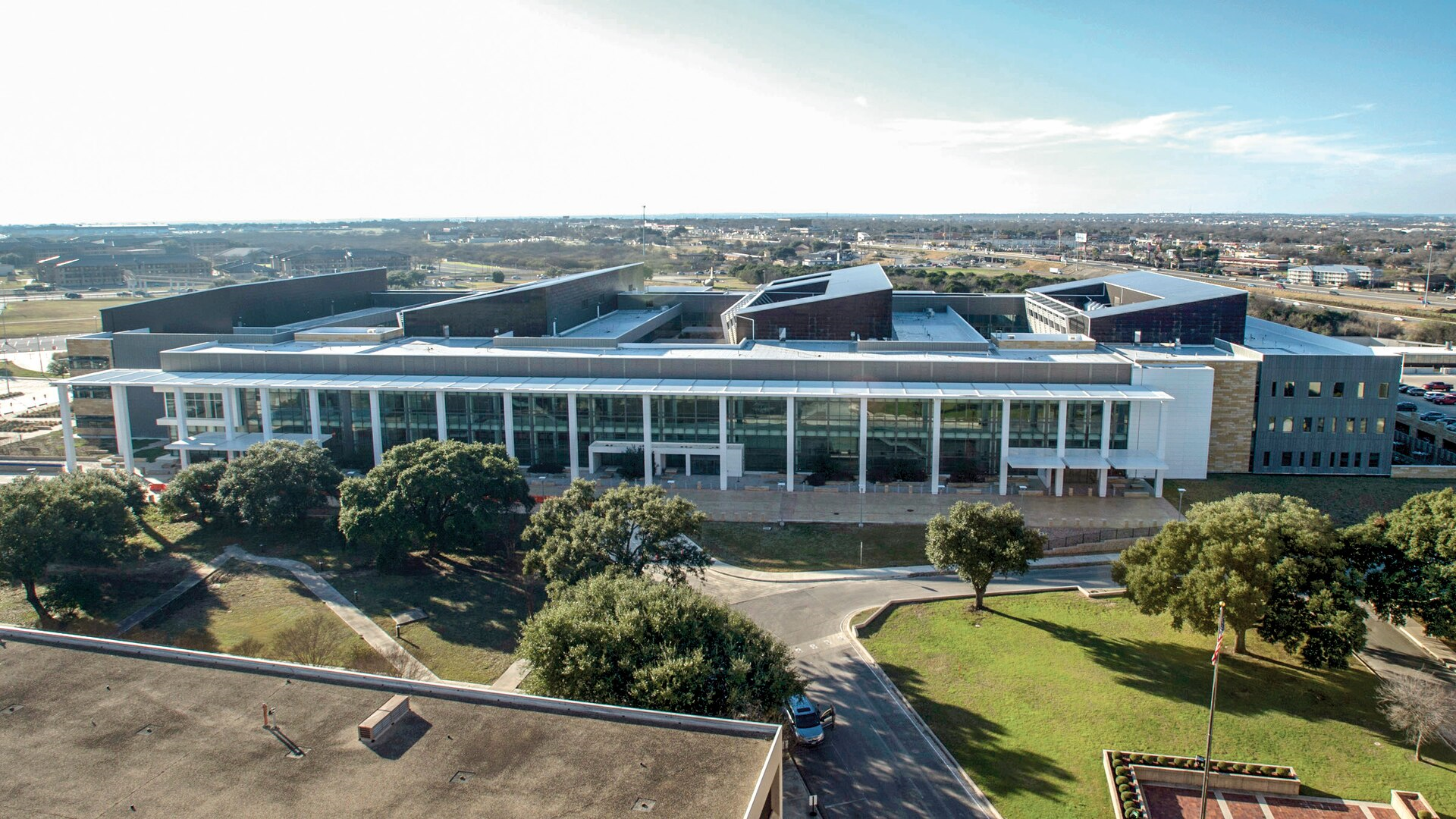
Current WHASC as seen from the top of the old WHASC

Wilford Hall Ambulatory Surgical Center (WHASC), formerly known as Wilford Hall Medical Center, is a U.S. Air Force medical treatment facility located on the grounds of San Antonio's Lackland Air Force Base. Operated by the 59th Medical Wing, Wilford Hall is the Defense Department's largest outpatient ambulatory surgical center, providing the full spectrum of primary care, specialty care, and outpatient surgery. The medical facility is named after former Air Force physician, Maj. Gen. Wilford F. Hall, a visionary pioneer whose contributions were instrumental in the development of aeromedical evacuation.

In US Air Force lineage terms, the Wilford Hall Medical Center was consolidated with the 59th Tactical Fighter Wing on 1 July 1993 and became the 59th Medical Wing.

On 15 Sept. 2011, Wilford Hall Medical Center was renamed Wilford Hall Ambulatory Surgical Center as part of the 2005 Base Realignment and Closure Commission actions. As part of the realignment, a replacement building, also named Wilford Hall started construction in the area directly west of the existing building. The building cost $418 million and was 682,000 sq ft in size.

Between May 30 and July 14, 2017, services were systematically moved from the old building into the new one. The first patient was seen on June 7, 2017, in the new Wilford Hall building.

The contract for demolishing the old building was awarded in 2018, but demolition did not start until late 2023, finishing in 2024. Once the site is leveled, it is to be restored to provide additional parking and more than 25 acres of green space with a track.

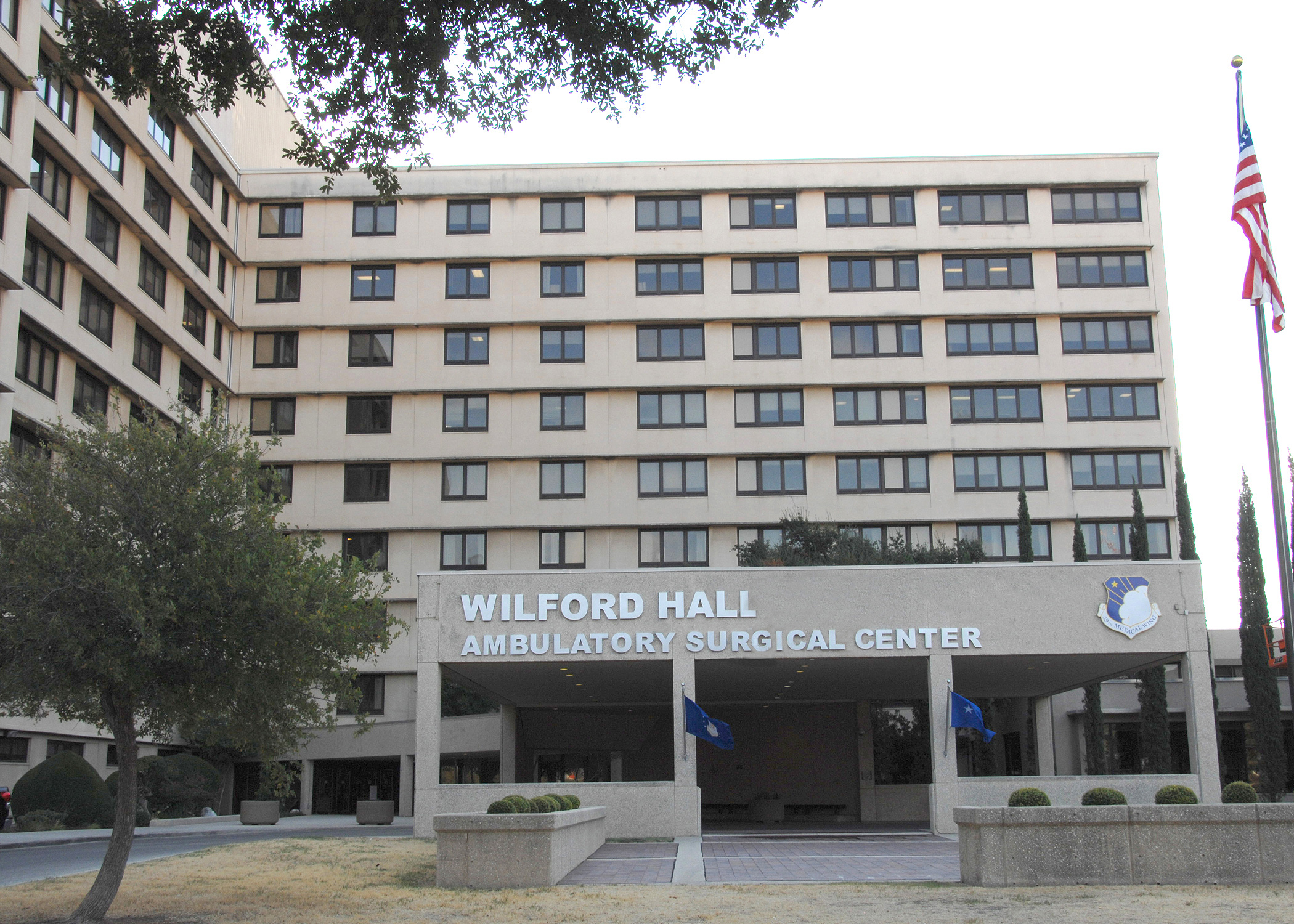
Old WHASC main entrance

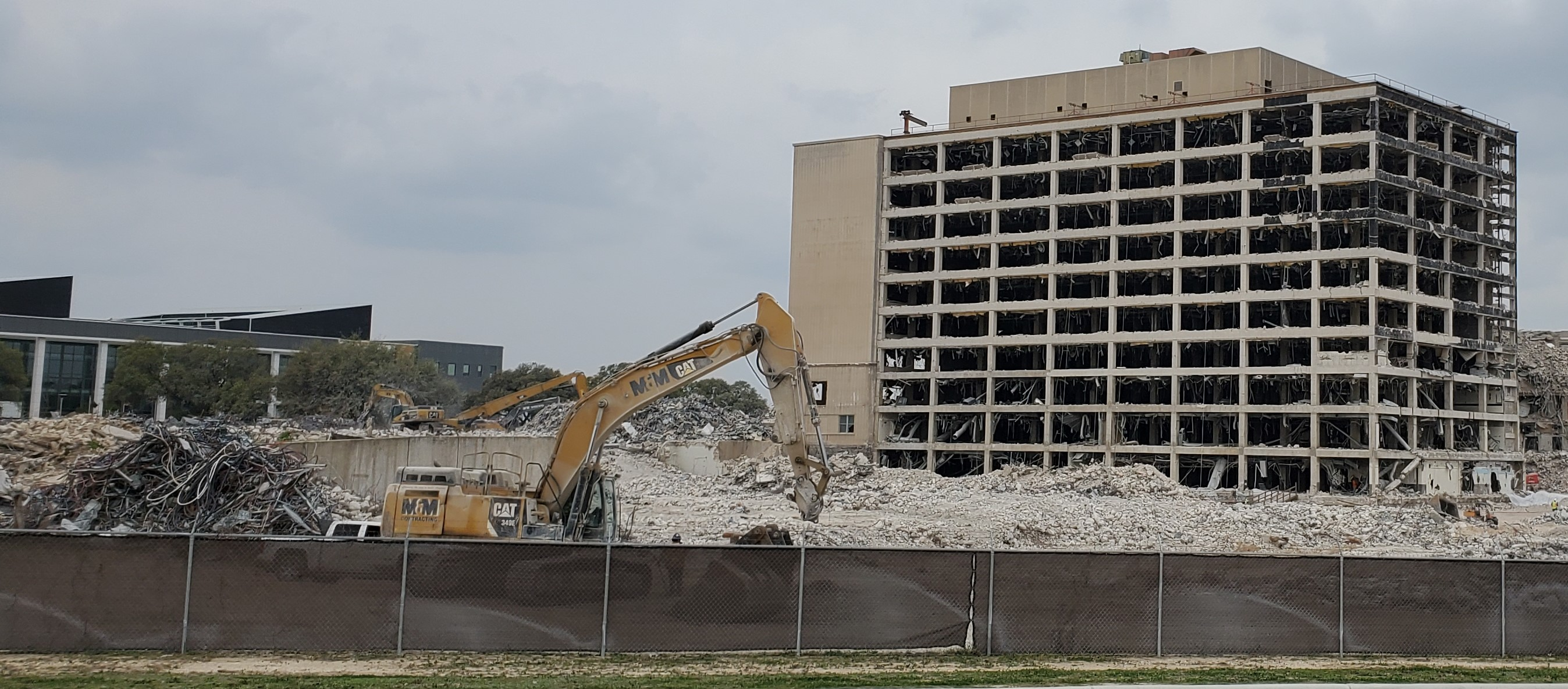
Old WHASC undergoing demolition in March 2024 with the current WHASC on the left
