= Louis M. Rousselot =

American surgeon

Louis M. Rousselot (died March 28, 1974) was an American surgeon who served as Assistant Secretary of Defense for Health and Environment from 1970 to 1971.

== Biography ==
Rousselot received his B.A. from Columbia College in 1923. He received his M.D. from Columbia University College of Physicians & Surgeons in 1927, before earning a M.S. and a Doctor of Medical Science in surgery. He then joined Columbia-Presbyterian Medical Center as a faculty and staff member.

During World War II, Rousselot served in the U.S. Army Medical Corps in Europe, becoming chief of surgery and commanding officer of the 108th General Hospital in Paris.

From 1948 to 1967, he taught at New York University Medical School. He was also director of surgery of Saint Vincent's Catholic Medical Centers before retiring from his medical career to join The Pentagon, where he served as Deputy Assistant Secretary of Defense for Health Affairs for 2 1/2 years before becoming Assistant Secretary of Defense for Health and Environment in 1970, a new position created under the Nixon administration.

As Assistant Secretary, Rousselot was the Chief Medical Officer of The Pentagon. He was responsible for program and policies of the United States Department of Defense regarding medical facilities, treatment, and health, as well as environmental quality standards for the Armed Forces and dependents. He was also a liaison between the Secretary of Defense, and national and international health agencies such as the National Institutes of Health, the Red Cross and the medical sections of all North Atlantic Treaty Organization countries.

In 1971, he left the Department of Defense to join National Institutes of Health as a special assistant, holding the post until 1973.

== Personal life ==
Rousselot died on March 27, 1974, of an aneurysm while vacationing in Puerto Rico. He was 70 years old.

He married Evelyn Anita Hastrup, daughter of the Danish Consul in Puerto Rico, in 1935. The couple had one son.
