= Stephen C. Joseph =

American politician (born 1937)

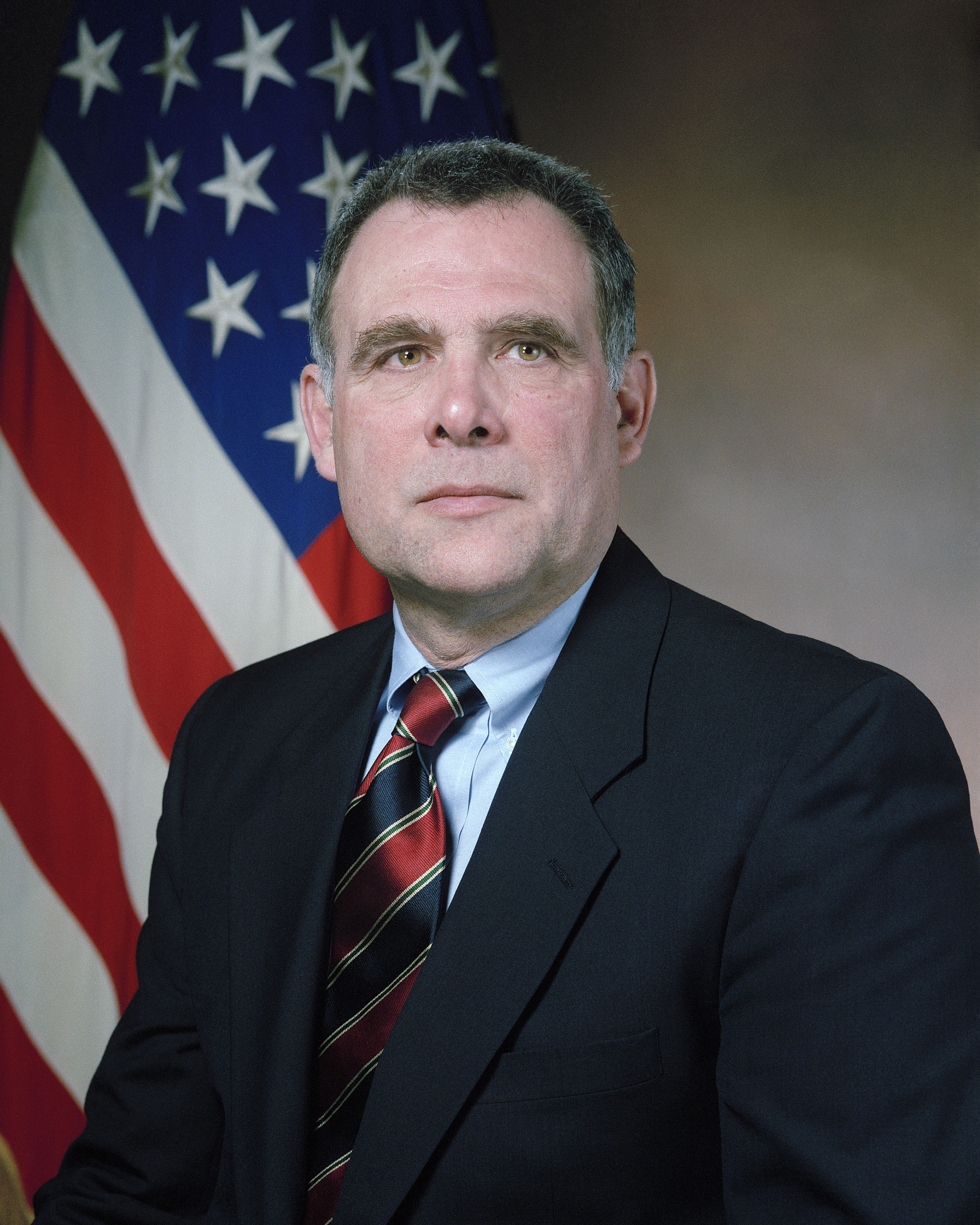
- Official portrait, 1994

United States Assistant Secretary of Defense for Health Affairs
- In office March 23, 1994 – March 31, 1997
- President: Bill Clinton
- Preceded by: Edward D. Martin (acting)
- Succeeded by: Edward D. Martin (acting)

35th New York City Health Commissioner
- In office March 11, 1986 – March 30, 1990
- Mayor: Ed Koch; David Dinkins
- Preceded by: David Sencer
- Succeeded by: Woody Myers

Personal details
- Born: Stephen Carl Joseph; November 25, 1937 Brooklyn, New York, U.S.
- Spouse: Elizabeth Ann Preble
- Children: 2
- Education: Harvard College (BS); Yale School of Medicine (MD); Johns Hopkins School of Public Health (MPH)

Stephen Carl Joseph (born November 25, 1937) was the New York City Health Commissioner from 1986 until 1990 after having worked at the United Nations Children's Fund (UNICEF) as Special Coordinator for Child Health and Survival. He went on to become dean of the School of Public Health at the University of Minnesota and Assistant Secretary of Defense for Health Affairs.

== Biography ==
Joseph was born on November 25, 1937, in Brooklyn, New York City. He attended Fieldston School, graduating with his high school diploma in June 1955. He studied at Tufts College for one year before transferring to Harvard College. Joseph earned a bachelor's degree cum laude from Harvard in 1959, a medical degree cum laude from the Yale School of Medicine in 1963 and a master of public health degree from Johns Hopkins University in 1968. He completed his resident internship in pediatrics at the Boston Children's Medical Center.

As New York City Health Commissioner, Joseph was credited with aggressively fighting the AIDS epidemic there.

Joseph married Elizabeth Ann Preble. He has two daughters.

== Publications ==
- Dragon Within the Gates: The Once and Future AIDS Epidemic
- Summer of Fifty-Seven: Coming of Age in Wyoming’s Shining Mountains
- River of Stone, River of Sand: A Story of Medicine and Adventure
