= Enrique Méndez Jr. =

Puerto Rican general (1931–2024)

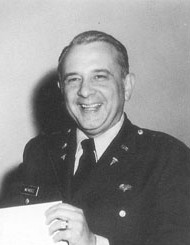

United States Assistant Secretary of Defense for Health Affairs
- In office March 5, 1990 – January 20, 1993
- President: George H. W. Bush
- Secretary: Richard B. Cheney
- Preceded by: William E. Mayer
- Succeeded by: Edward D. Martin

Personal details
- Born: July 15, 1931 Santurce, Puerto Rico
- Died: May 16, 2024 (aged 92) Fredericksburg, Virginia
- Resting place: Quantico National Cemetery
- Education: University of Puerto Rico at Mayagüez (BS); Loyola University (MD)
- Civilian awards: Department of Defense Medal for Distinguished Public Service

Military service
- Branch/service: United States Army
- Years of service: 1954–1983
- Rank: Major General
- Unit: Tripler Army Medical Center
- Commands: Commander, Walter Reed Army Medical Center
- Military awards: Army Distinguished Service Medal; Legion of Merit

Major General Enrique Méndez Jr. Grau (15 July 1931 – May 16, 2024) was a United States Army officer who was also the first Puerto Rican to hold the positions of Army Deputy Surgeon General, Commander of the Walter Reed Army Medical Center and Assistant Secretary of Defense for Health Affairs. He was also the Dean and President of the Ponce School of Medicine in Puerto Rico. Also served as Secretary of Health of Puerto Rico.

== Early years ==
Méndez was born and raised in Santurce, Puerto Rico. His father was a civil engineer and his mother a housewife, he was one of two children born to the couple. He received his primary and secondary education in his native Puerto Rico. During his high school years, Méndez befriended a few physicians who would occasionally invite him to go visit hospitals. He became interested in medicine after witnessing a couple of surgical procedures.

In high school he was one of the founders of Zeta Mu Gamma fraternity in Mayagüez, Puerto Rico. He enrolled at the University of Puerto Rico at Mayagüez, which had a science faculty. He earned his BS in biology in 1951. He enrolled in the medical school of Loyola University in Chicago and earned his MD degree in 1954.

== Military career ==
Méndez joined the Army after completing his internship at Mercy Hospital in Chicago. He entered the Army as a GMO which stands for "general-duty medical officer" and entered active duty at Fort Sam Houston in Texas. His first assignment was to Camp Gordon, near Augusta, Georgia. His first duty at Camp Gordon was in a dispensary which was an ambulatory care facility. After that assignment and attending the Company Officers' Course and he was reassigned to Brooke General Hospital where he underwent his specialty training (residency) in internal medicine.

In 1960, he was sent to Tripler Army Medical Center in Hawaii. During his service there he had the opportunity to teach interns and residents and set up a dialysis program.

In 1963, Méndez was assigned to medical research and development at Edgewood Arsenal in Maryland, where he served for less than a year and was once more sent to Fort Sam Houston. He was assigned to the Medical Field Service School as an instructor. He helped to establish a biological and chemical sciences branch. In 1967, Méndez, who was then a lieutenant colonel, attended the United States Army Command and General Staff College at Fort Leavenworth. Upon completion of the CGSC, he was sent to Frankfurt, Germany, where he became the surgeon of the 3rd Armored Division. He served as such until 1968 when he was sent to Caserma Ederle in Vicenza, Italy where he commanded his first U.S. Army Hospital the 45th Field Hospital.

=== Army Deputy Surgeon General ===
In 1970, Méndez was promoted to colonel and assigned to Washington, D.C., as chief of the Medical Corps Career Activities. In 1972, he was selected to go to the Industrial College of the Armed Forces for a year and then he was reassigned to Fort Sam Houston, Texas, to the Academy of Health Sciences. In 1975, he was assigned as the deputy chief of staff for operations of the Health Services Command and subsequently promoted to brigadier general. Méndez was named deputy surgeon general and remained in that position until 1981, when he was named commander of Walter Reed Army Medical Center. Méndez retired from the United States Army in June 1983 with the rank of major general.

== Ponce School of Medicine ==
In 1983, Méndez was offered the position of Dean of the Ponce School of Medicine in Puerto Rico He accepted and moved to the island with his wife. A year later he was named president of the institution. He served in said position for four years after which he accepted the position of Director of Damas Hospital in Ponce. He was appointed Secretary of Health of the Commonwealth of Puerto Rico in 1989.

== Assistant Secretary of Defense for Health Affairs ==
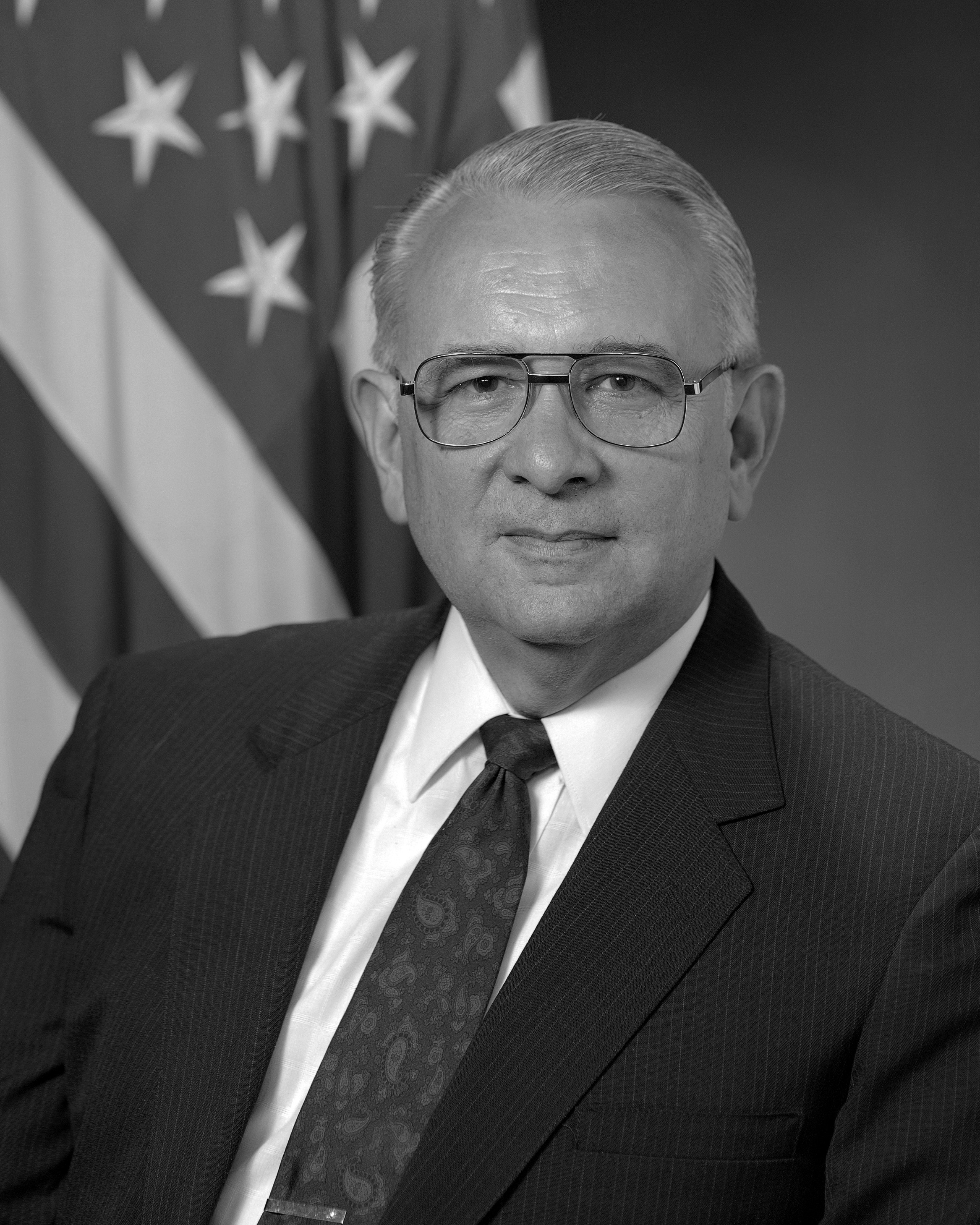
Méndez in 1990

In 1990, Méndez received a phone call from the White House personnel office and was asked whether he would consider the position of Assistant Secretary of Defense for Health Affairs, Department of Defense. On December 5, 1989, President George H. Bush officially announced the nomination of Méndez for the position of Assistant Secretary of Defense for Health Affairs. Among his responsibilities was to give health advice to the Secretary of Defense which at the time was Richard Bruce "Dick" Cheney. He was responsible for a system of health care that included hospitals, medical clinics, and dental clinics scattered worldwide. Méndez served in said position from March 1990 until January 1993.

Méndez joined the firm of Martin, Blanck & Associates, a federal health services consulting firm based in Falls Church, Virginia as a Partner. Dr. Méndez and his wife, the former Olga M. Munoz, have four children and six grandchildren.

== Death ==
Méndez died on May 16, 2024, at Mary Washington Hospital in Fredericksburg, Virginia at age 92. He was buried at Quantico National Cemetery.

== Recognitions ==
Among his numerous awards and honors are the following:

- The Department of Defense Medal for Distinguished Public Service
- The Alumni Award for Loyola University
- The Laureate Award from the American College of Physicians
- The Distinguished Service Award from the Federal Health Care Executives Institute Alumni Association
- The Knight rank from the Order of the Holy Sepulchre
- The Lifetime Achievement Award of the National Puerto Rican Coalition
- The Puerto Rico Veterans Hall of Fame (2022)

Honorary degrees

- Doctor of Science from the Universidad Central del Caribe in Puerto Rico
- Doctor, Honoris Causa, from the Military Medical Academy of Poland
- Doctor of Public Service, Honoris Causa, from the University of North Texas-Texas College of Osteopathic Medicine
- Doctor of Education, Honoris Causa, from Caribbean University in Puerto Rico

== Military awards and recognitions ==
Among MG Méndez's military awards are the following:

Expert Field Medical Badge

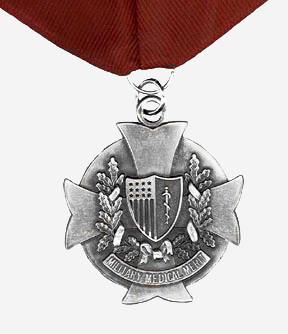
Army Distinguished Service Medal
Legion of Merit with one oak leaf cluster
Meritorious Service Medal
Army Commendation Medal
National Defense Service Medal
Army Service Ribbon
Overseas Service Ribbon
Order of Military Medical Merit

== See also ==
- List of Puerto Ricans
- List of Puerto Rican military personnel

Military offices
Preceded by Maj. Gen. Bernhard T. Mittemeyer	Commanding General of Walter Reed Army Medical Center; October 1981 – June 1983	Succeeded by Maj. Gen. Louis A. Malogne
