= Berry Plan =

United States policy

The Berry Plan was a Vietnam War-era program in the United States that allowed physicians to defer obligatory military service until they had completed medical school and residency training. More than 42,000 physicians and surgeons were affected by the Berry Plan, named after Dr. Frank B. Berry, who served as the Assistant Secretary of Defense for Health and Medical Affairs from 1954–1961.

The Plan, enacted in 1954, arose out of a proposed "Doctor's Draft," originally met with objections from the American Medical Association, The Association of American Medical Colleges, and the American Hospital Association, who felt the draft would deprive them of a pool of young men who would staff their hospitals. The Berry Plan offered draftees three choices: entry into the Armed Forces after completing a medical internship, after completing one year of residency and returning to their residencies after completion of service, and after completion of a full residency program. The plan did not promise the branch of service or the length of deferral, rather the applicant was relegated to partial or full deferment. The applicant was also told which branch of the military he or she would be allocated. The applicants were not advised that if they signed before age 25 they would be subjected to two years of active reserve duty after they fulfilled the active military commitment. The applicants were titled "obligated volunteers". The Berry Plan ended in 1973, with the last four physicians to complete their education and training entering the armed forces in 1980.

== See also ==
- Conscription in the United States
- Selective Service System
