= Assistant Secretary of Defense for Health Affairs =

United States government official

- Flag of an assistant secretary of defense

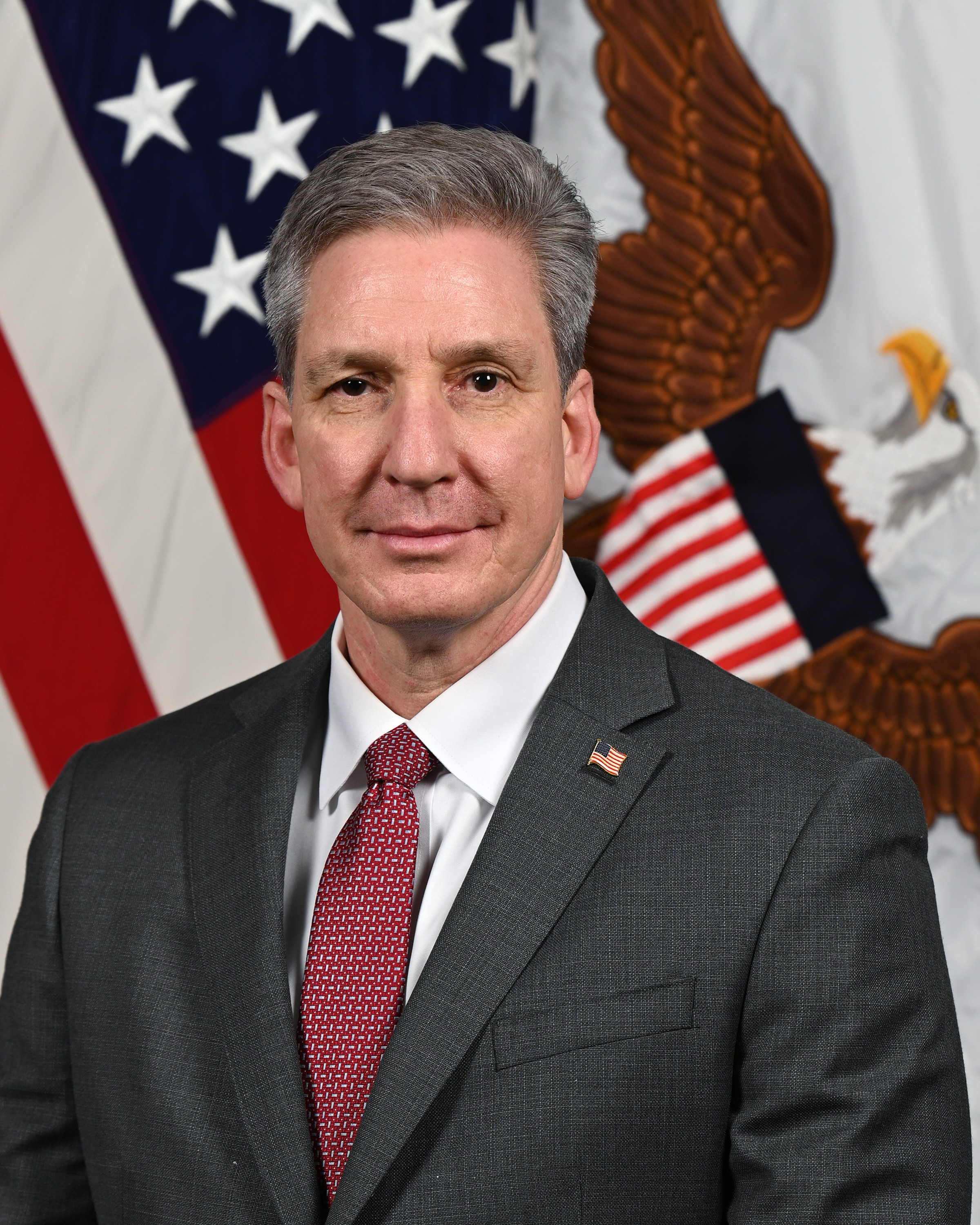
- Incumbent; Keith Bass since January 12, 2026
- Department of Defense
- Abbreviation: ASD (HA)
- Member of: Office of the Secretary of Defense
- Reports to: Secretary of Defense
- Appointer: The president with Senate advice and consent
- Term length: At the pleasure of the president
- First holder: Dr. Louis M. Rousselot
- Salary: $165,300
- Website: Official website

The assistant secretary of defense for health affairs (ASD(HA)) is chartered under United States Department of Defense Directive (DoDD) 5136.1 in 1994. This DoDD states that the ASD(HA) is the principal advisor to the secretary of defense on all "DoD health policies, programs and activities". In addition to exercising oversight of all DoD health resources, ASD(HA) serves as director of the Tricare Management Activity.

The ASD(HA) reports to the undersecretary of defense (personnel and readiness), or USD(P&R). A political appointee responsible for the United States Department of Defense's Military Health System, the ASD(HA) is an Executive Service Level IV official. The assistant secretary is nominated by the president of the United States, and confirmed by the United States Senate.

== History ==
This position was originally established in 1949 as Chairman, Armed Forces Medical Policy Council. Reorganization Plan No. 6 (1953) abolished the council and transferred its functions to a new position, Assistant Secretary of Defense (Health Affairs). In August 1953, some functions of this position were transferred to Assistant Secretary of Defense (Manpower), and the title was changed to Assistant Secretary of Defense (Health and Medical).

The position was abolished completely on January 31, 1961, and for the remainder of the decade, all of its functions were vested in Assistant Secretary of Defense (Manpower). However, Congress authorized a permanent assistant secretary position for health affairs in November 1969 (P.L. 91-121). The post was then re-established as Assistant Secretary of Defense (Health and Environment) in June 1970 by Defense Directive 5136.1. In January 1976, the position was re-designated Assistant Secretary of Defense (Health Affairs), a title that has endured to the present day.

== Responsibilities ==
The ASD(HA) is responsible for a number of organizations which directly affect the health care of service members and their dependents. These responsibilities are executed through several Senior Executive Service managers, including the principal deputy assistant secretary of defense (health affairs) and the following deputy assistant secretaries:

- Force Health Protection & Readiness (FHP&R)
- Clinical and Program Policy
- Health Budgets and Financial Policy.

Other special activities within Health Affairs' jurisdiction include the TRICARE Management Activity, an extensive network of private physicians and hospitals providing health maintenance to service members. With a $40 billion budget (as of 2005), the Military Health System (MHS) provides care for roughly 9.2 million (as of 2005) people through TRICARE and through more than 70 military hospitals worldwide. MHS comprises over 133,000 military and civilian doctors, nurses, medical educators, researchers, health care providers, allied health professionals, and health administration personnel worldwide.

The ASD (HA) oversees the Uniformed Services University of Health Sciences (USUHS), which educates uniform physicians and other health professionals for the Army, Navy, Air Force and Public Health Service. The ASD(HA) also directly tasks the International Health Division of FHP&R, while FHP&R provides administrative oversight and resources.

== Office holders ==
The table below includes both the various titles of this post over time, as well as all the holders of those offices.

Assistant secretaries of defense (health affairs)
Name	Tenure	SecDef(s) served under	President(s) served under
Chairman, Armed Forces Medical Policy Council
Dr. Raymond B. Allen	July 5, 1949 – September 30, 1949	Louis A. Johnson	Harry Truman
Dr. Richard L. Meiling	October 1, 1949 - January 2, 1951	Louis A. Johnson; George C. Marshall	Harry Truman
Dr. W. Randolph Lovelace	July 1, 1951 - March 31, 1952	George C. Marshall; Robert A. Lovett	Harry Truman
Dr. Melvin A. Casberg	April 1, 1952 - March 31, 1953	Robert A. Lovett; Charles E. Wilson	Harry Truman; Dwight Eisenhower
Assistant to the Secretary of Defense (Health Affairs)
Dr. Melvin A. Casberg	April 1, 1953 - August 2, 1953	Charles E. Wilson	Dwight Eisenhower
Assistant Secretary of Defense (Health and Medical)
Dr. Melvin A. Casberg	August 3, 1953 - January 27, 1954	Charles E. Wilson	Dwight Eisenhower
Dr. Frank B. Berry Further information: Berry Plan	January 28, 1954 - January 31, 1961	Charles E. Wilson; Neil H. McElroy; Thomas S. Gates	Dwight Eisenhower; John Kennedy
Assistant Secretary of Defense (Health and Environment)
Dr. Louis M. Rousselot	July 22, 1970 - July 1, 1971	Melvin R. Laird	Richard Nixon
Dr. Richard Sloan Wilbur	July 27, 1971 - September 1, 1973	Melvin R. Laird; Elliot L. Richardson; James R. Schlesinger	Richard Nixon
Dr. James R. Cowan	February 19, 1974 - March 1, 1976	James R. Schlesinger; Donald H. Rumsfeld	Richard Nixon; Gerald Ford
Vernon McKenzie (Acting)	March 2, 1976 - March 8, 1976	Donald H. Rumsfeld	Gerald Ford
Assistant Secretary of Defense (Health Affairs)
Dr. Robert N. Smith	August 30, 1976 - January 7, 1978	Donald H. Rumsfeld; Harold Brown	Gerald Ford; Jimmy Carter
Vernon McKenzie (Acting)	January 8, 1978 - August 14, 1979	Harold Brown	Jimmy Carter
Dr. John Moxley III	September 14, 1979 - August 9, 1981	Harold Brown; Caspar W. Weinberger	Jimmy Carter; Ronald Reagan
Dr. John Beary (Acting)	August 10, 1981 - September 24, 1983	Caspar W. Weinberger	Ronald Reagan
Vernon McKenzie (Acting)	September 25, 1983 - November 17, 1983	Caspar W. Weinberger	Ronald Reagan
Dr. William E. Mayer	November 18, 1983 - April 21, 1989	Caspar W. Weinberger; Frank C. Carlucci III; William Howard Taft IV (Acting); Richard B. Cheney	Ronald Reagan; George H. W. Bush
Dr. Enrique Méndez Jr.	March 5, 1990 - January 20, 1993	Richard B. Cheney	George H. W. Bush
Dr. Edward D. Martin (Acting)	January 20, 1993 - March 23, 1994	Leslie Aspin, Jr. William J. Perry	William Clinton
Dr. Stephen C. Joseph	March 23, 1994 - March 31, 1997	William J. Perry; William S. Cohen	William Clinton
Dr. Edward D. Martin (Acting)	April 1, 1997 - February 28, 1998	William S. Cohen	William Clinton
Gary Christopherson (Acting)	March 1, 1998 - May 25, 1998	William S. Cohen	William Clinton
Dr. Sue Bailey	May 26, 1998 - August 10, 2000	William S. Cohen	William Clinton
Dr. J. Jarrett Clinton	August 14, 2000 - October 29, 2001	William S. Cohen; Donald H. Rumsfeld	William Clinton; George W. Bush
Dr. William Winkenwerder, Jr.	October 29, 2001 - April 12, 2007	Donald H. Rumsfeld	George W. Bush
Dr. S. Ward Casscells	April 12, 2007 - April 28, 2009	Robert M. Gates	George W. Bush; Barack Obama
Ellen Embrey (Acting*)	April 29, 2009 - January 31, 2010	Robert M. Gates	Barack Obama
Allen W. Middleton (Acting*)	February 1, 2010 - February 28, 2010	Robert M. Gates	Barack Obama
Dr. Charles L. Rice (Acting*)	March 1, 2010 - September 6, 2010	Robert M. Gates	Barack Obama
Dr. George P. Taylor, Jr. (Acting*)	September 7, 2010 - December 22, 2010	Robert M. Gates	Barack Obama
Dr. Jonathan Woodson	December 22, 2010 - May 1, 2016	Robert M. Gates; Leon Panetta; Chuck Hagel; Ashton Carter	Barack Obama
Dr. Karen S. Guice (Acting*)	May 2, 2016 - January 20, 2017	Ashton Carter	Barack Obama
Dr. David J. Smith (Acting*)	January 20, 2017 - August 23, 2017	James Mattis	Donald Trump
Thomas P. McCaffery (Acting)	August 23, 2017 - August 5, 2019	James Mattis; Mark Esper	Donald Trump
Honorable Thomas P. McCaffery	August 5, 2019 - January 20, 2021	Mark Esper	Donald Trump
Dr. Terry A. Adirim (Acting)	January 20, 2021 – March 1, 2023	Lloyd Austin	Joe Biden
Lester Martínez López	March 1, 2023 – October 31, 2024	Lloyd Austin	Joe Biden
Seileen Mullen (Acting)	October 31, 2024 - January 20, 2025	Lloyd Austin	Joe Biden
Dr. Steve Ferrara (Acting)	January 20, 2025 - January 12, 2026	Pete Hegseth	Donald Trump
Keith Bass	January 12, 2026 – Present	Pete Hegseth	Donald Trump

Persons marked with a * are interim officials described in military documents as "Performing the Duties of the ASD/HA," rather than as "Acting"
