= 59th Medical Wing =

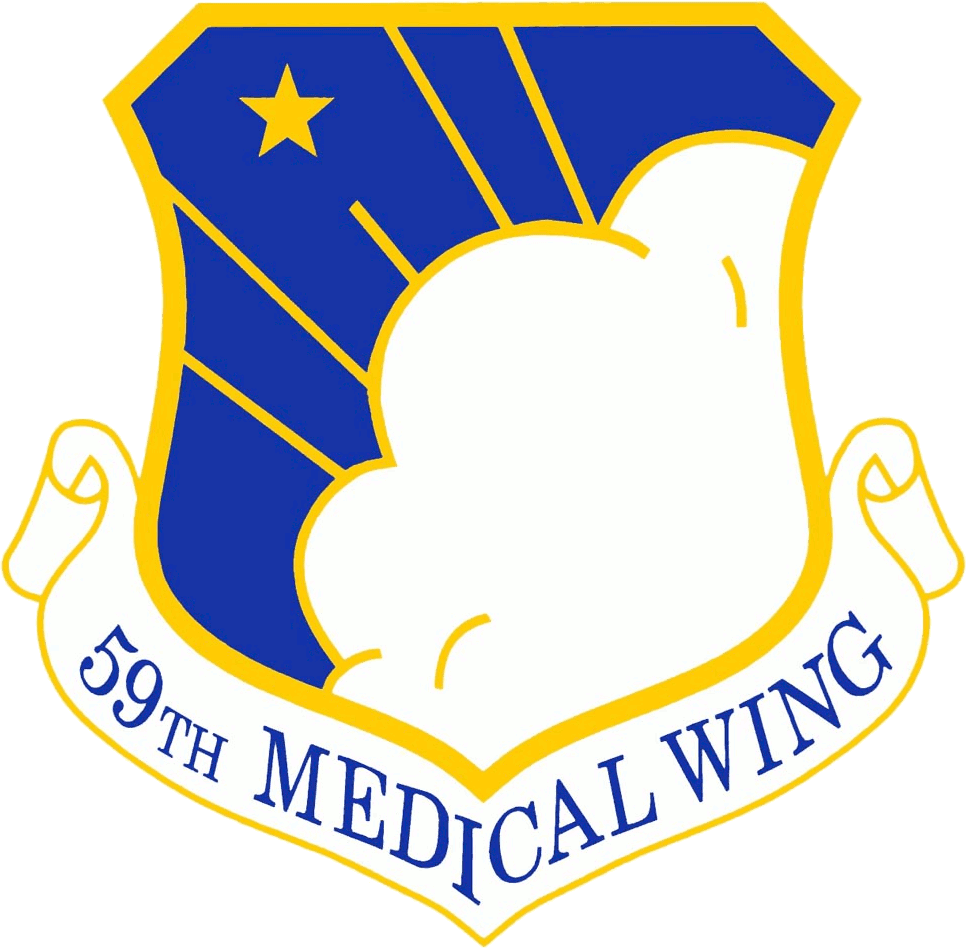
- Emblem of the 59th Medical Wing
- Active: 1941–1942; 1943–1944; 1948–present
- Country: United States
- Branch: United States Air Force
- Type: Wing
- Role: Military Medical
- Size: 8,000 personnel
- Part of: Air Force Medical Command
- Garrison/HQ: JBSA-Lackland, Texas
- Engagements: World War II (American Theater); Anti-Submarine Warfare 1941-1945

- Decorations: Air Force Outstanding Unit Award (17x)

Commanders
- Current commander: Col (Dr.) Tracy K. Bozung
- Vice Commander: Colonel Sean A Marshall
- Command Chief: Chief Master Sergeant Harvey McReynolds

The 59th Medical Wing (MDW) is the U.S. Air Force's largest medical wing and is the Air Force functional medical command for Joint Base San Antonio (JBSA). It's composed of seven medical groups across San Antonio. Three are located at the Wilford Hall Ambulatory Surgical Center (WHASC); the 959th Medical Group is located at San Antonio Military Medical Center (SAMMC), JBSA-Fort Sam Houston; the 59th Training Group - the wing's newest group, activated on 4 January 2016, is also located at JBSA-Fort Sam Houston. The 359th and 559th Medical Groups are located at and support the missions of JBSA-Randolph and JBSA-Lackland, respectively.

The 59th MDW operates with a $271 million budget, and a staff of 8,000 military, civilian, and contract personnel. The 59th MDW is home to the Critical Care Air Transport Team Pilot Unit (CCATT), which has executive management over 118 active-duty, Guard and Reserve teams. The wing also has the Defense Department's largest Blood Donor Center, a Warfighter Refractive Surgery Center, and Extracorporeal Life Support (ECLS) capability. The ECLS offers the only global transport option in the world, providing partial heart-lung bypass to eligible adults, infants, and children suffering from severe cardiopulmonary failure. The medical wing also has the largest dental facility in the DOD and the only dental group in the Air Force. The 59th Dental Group examines approximately 36,000 basic military trainees and 28,000 technical training students a year. It has the only stereolithography and modeling lab in the Air Force, which produces dimensionally-accurate medical models and craniofacial prostheses. This capability provides rehabilitative support to patients with acquired or congenital defects of the head and neck region.

== Healthcare ==
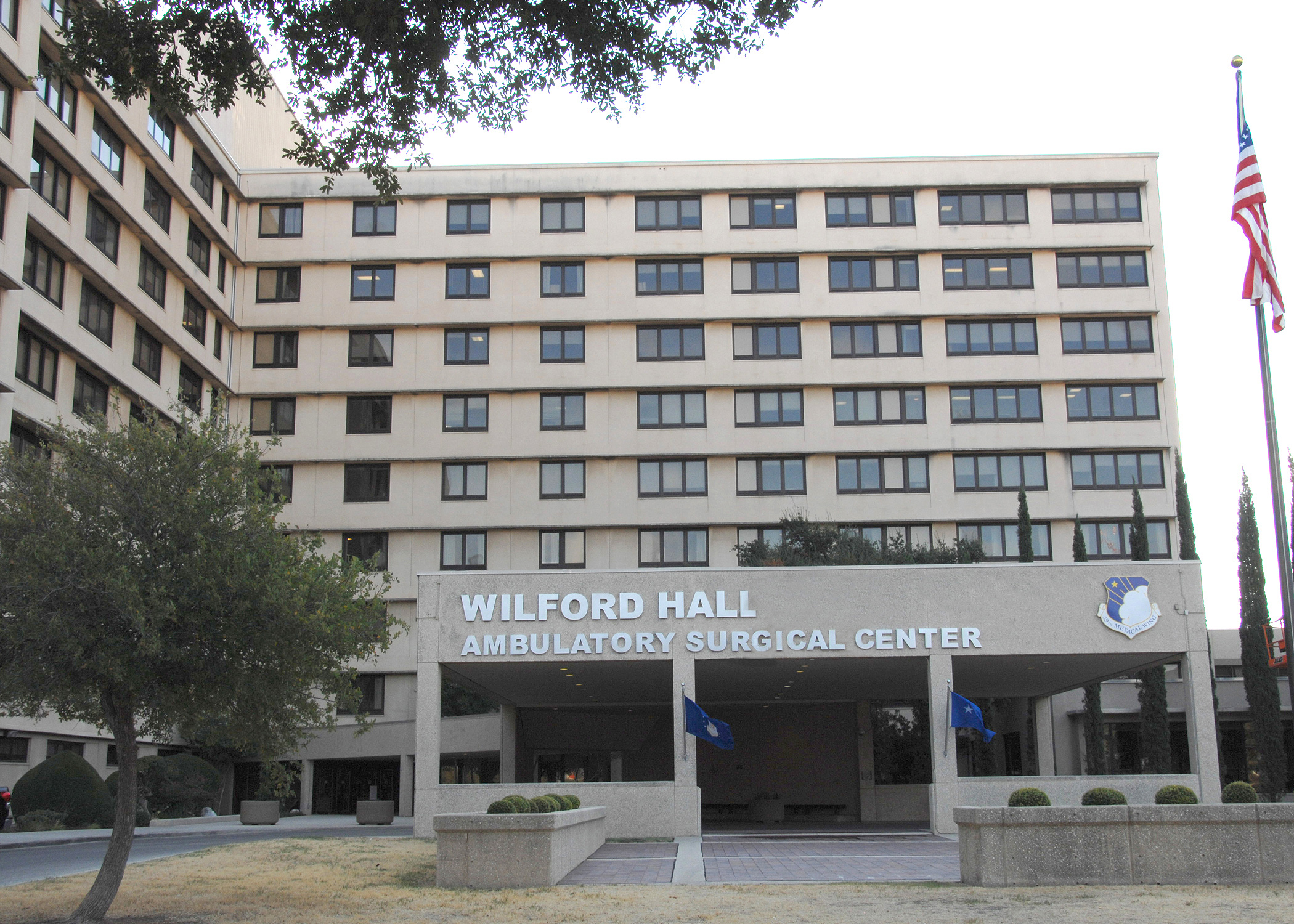
Wilford Hall

The 59th MDW provides medical care at various facilities in San Antonio. Wilford Hall Ambulatory Surgical Center is the Air Force's largest outpatient facility, providing a full range of primary care, specialty care, and outpatient surgery. At SAMMC, the DOD's largest inpatient medical facility, nearly 2,000 59th MDW personnel work with Army medics in areas such as the bone marrow transplant center, the burn unit, and other rare and complex treatment environments. The wing's highly specialized trauma surgeons, along with their Army counterparts, staff the Defense Department's only Joint Level 1 Trauma Center in the United States.

== Overseas deployments ==
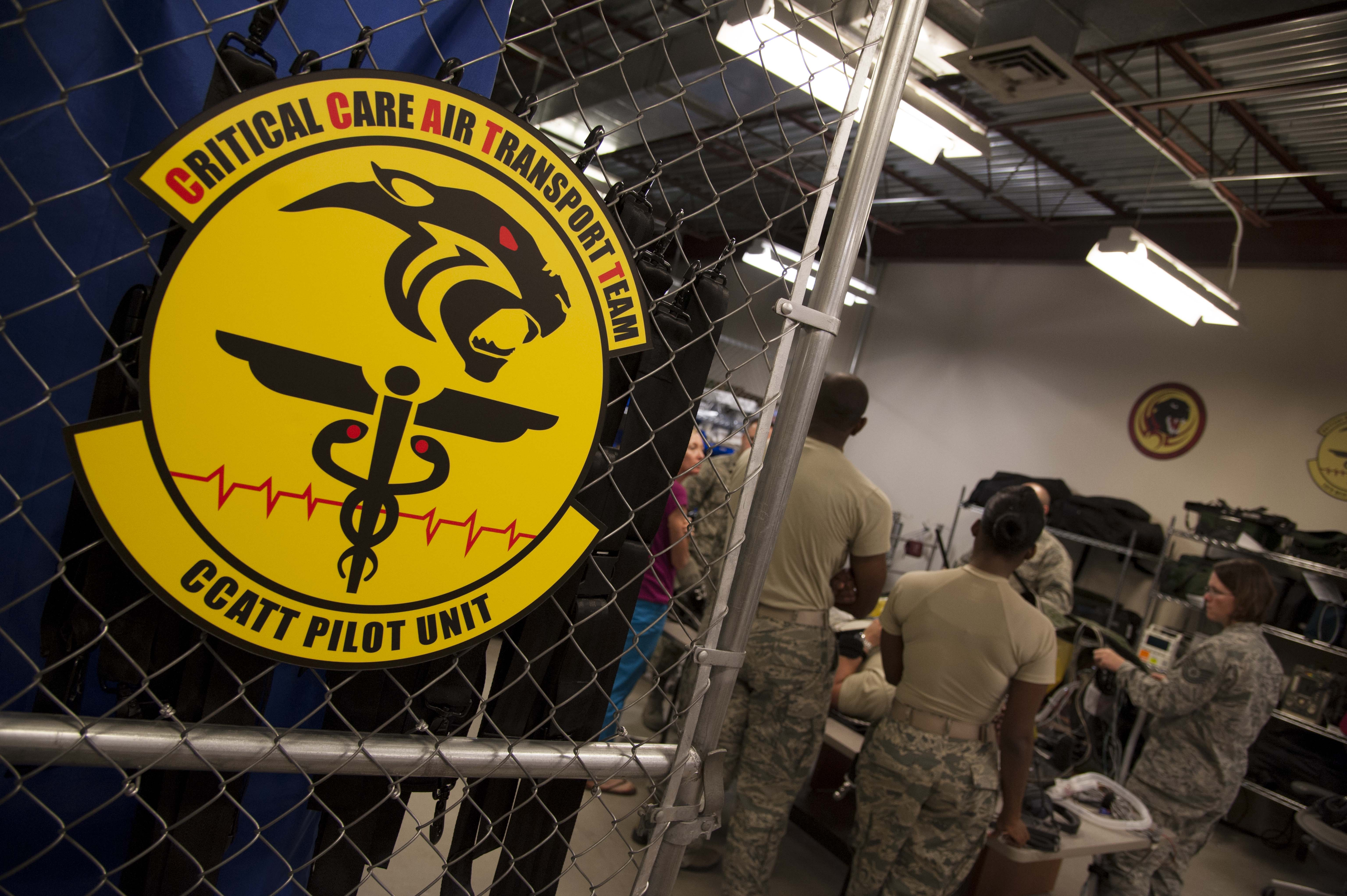
CCATTs operate an intensive care unit in an aircraft cabin during flight adding critical care capability to the Air Force Aeromedical Evacuation System.

Most of the wing's military personnel are assigned to one of several teams, which act as building blocks to form Expeditionary Medical Support hospitals and a number of specialized units, to include Critical Care Air Transport Teams. The wing has the largest medical mobility commitment in the U.S. Air Force and maintains approximately 2,950 mobility positions. At any one time, there are about 200 medics deployed worldwide, executing a joint U.S. mission in support of global operations. Additionally, the 59th Medical Wing oversees deployments for all Air Force medical assets assigned within JBSA. Outreach teams are regularly dispatched all over the globe to respond to emergencies, assist in Department of Defense contingency missions, and reinforce readiness training through real-world civil and humanitarian assistance missions.

== Education ==
The wing's postgraduate medical education function is merged with that of Brooke Army Medical Center under the San Antonio Uniformed Services Health Education Consortium (SAUSHEC). The two facilities, in close cooperation with the University of Texas Health Science Center at San Antonio (UTHSCSA), provide a wide array of training programs ranging from general surgery to emergency medical services administration. At any given time, SAUSHEC has roughly 600 residents enrolled in 37 graduate medical education (GME) programs, of which 60 percent are Air Force. There are an additional 22 programs for our Allied Health members, including: Psychology Internship; Health Psychology Fellow; Dietetic; Pharmacy Clinical; Pastoral Education; General Surgery Physician Assistant (PA); Emergency Medicine PA; Otolaryngology PA and Audiology.

The wing's training group supports military medical service and medical readiness training at the Medical Education and Training Campus on JBSA-Fort Sam Houston for 12,100 students annually, and at two operating locations, one detachment and 17 sites around the world. The 59th Training Group's partnership with METC affords training for the five uniformed services and international students. The group awards 24 Air Force specialty codes and 93,037 Community College of the Air Force credit hours annually while maintaining 14 national accreditations.

== Training ==
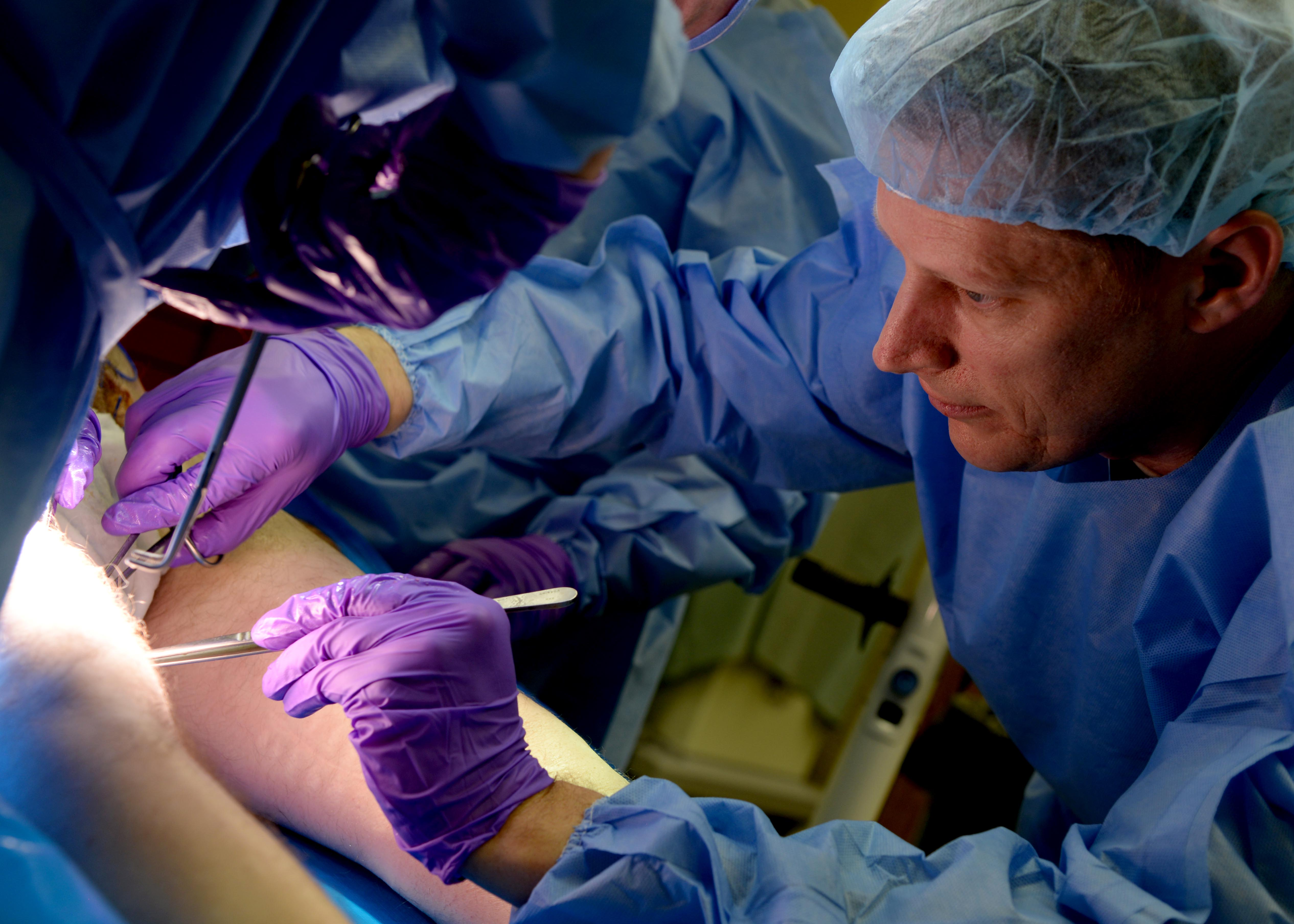
Training gives surgeons the skills necessary to treat patients down range.

In addition to the GME program, the 59th MDW is the largest of 15 clinical training sites in the Air Force, graduating an average of 500 officer and enlisted students in various dental and allied health programs each year. Additional training includes the Sustainment Training to Advance Readiness Skills (STARS) program, refresher trauma training and courses for specialized surgical and critical care teams. The 59th MDW has the largest DOD dental education mission, providing 85 percent of the Air Force's total dental training capacity.

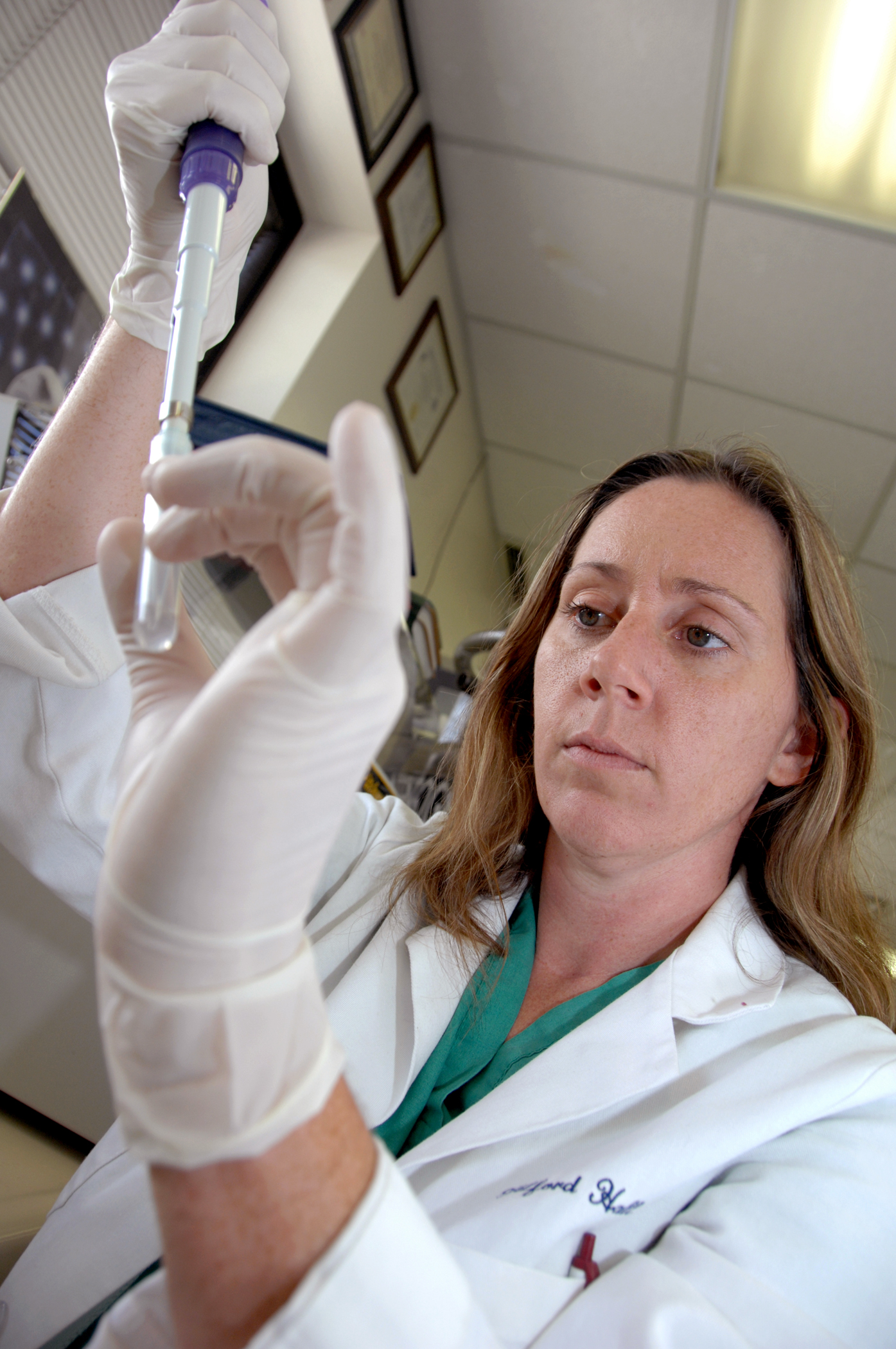
The 59th Clinical Investigations & Research Support is the largest biomedical research facility in the Air Force.

== Collaboration ==
As members of a strong inter-service team, the 59th Medical Wing is also dedicated to building partnerships with community organizations such as the Veterans Affairs Audie Murphy Hospital, University of Texas Health Science Center, Humana Military Healthcare Services, University Health System, and the Mayor's Fitness Council.

== Subordinate units ==
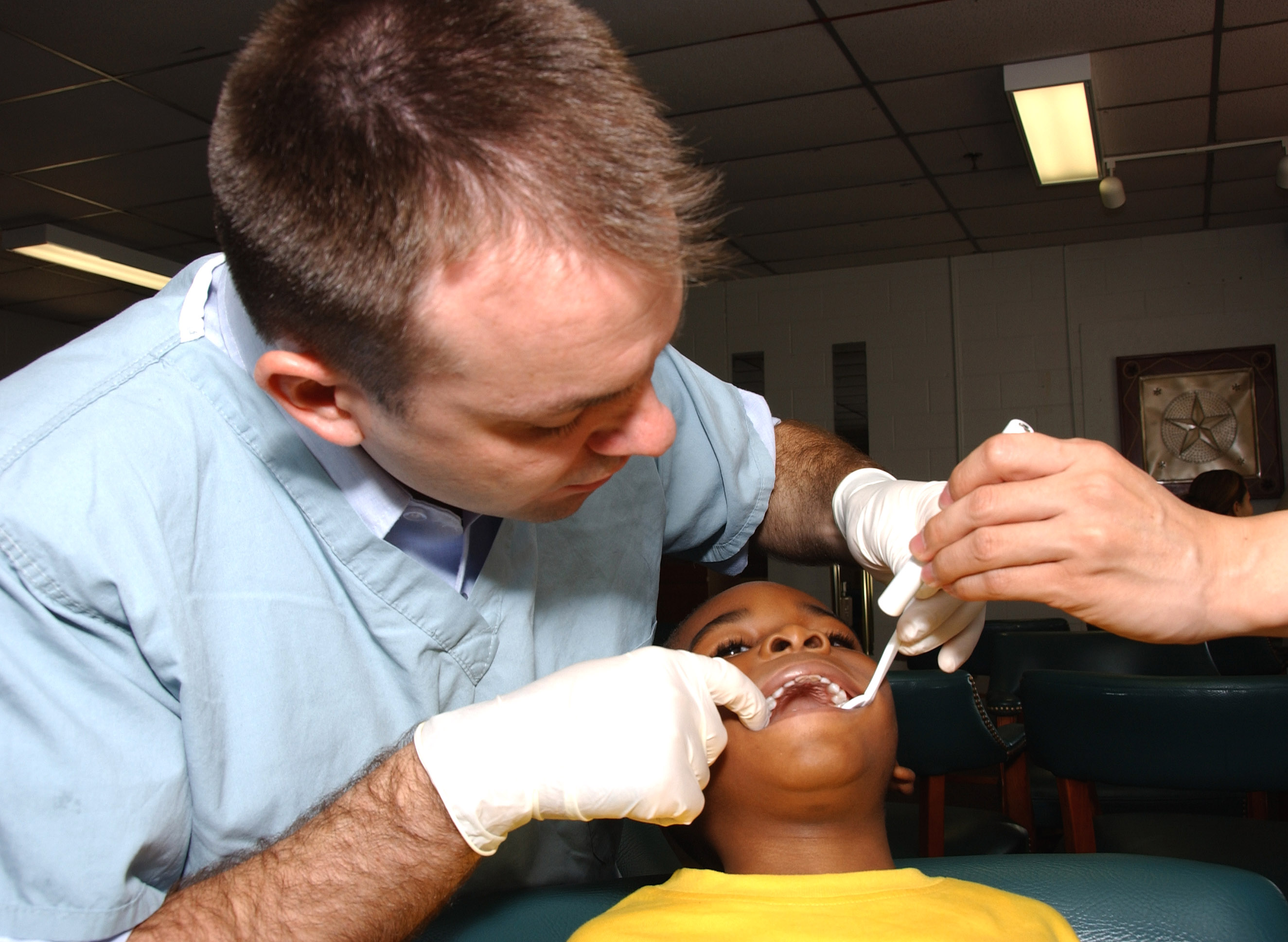
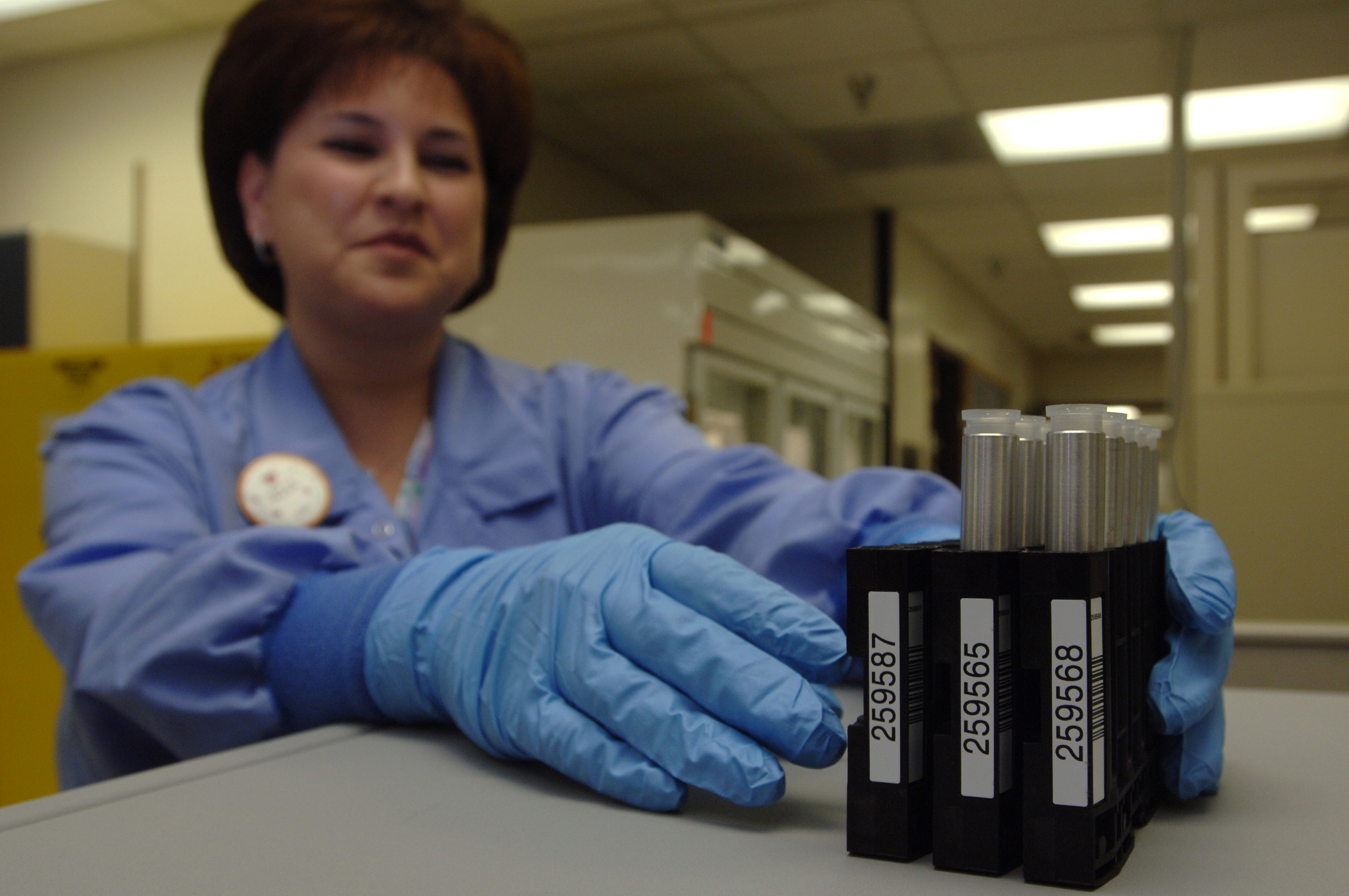
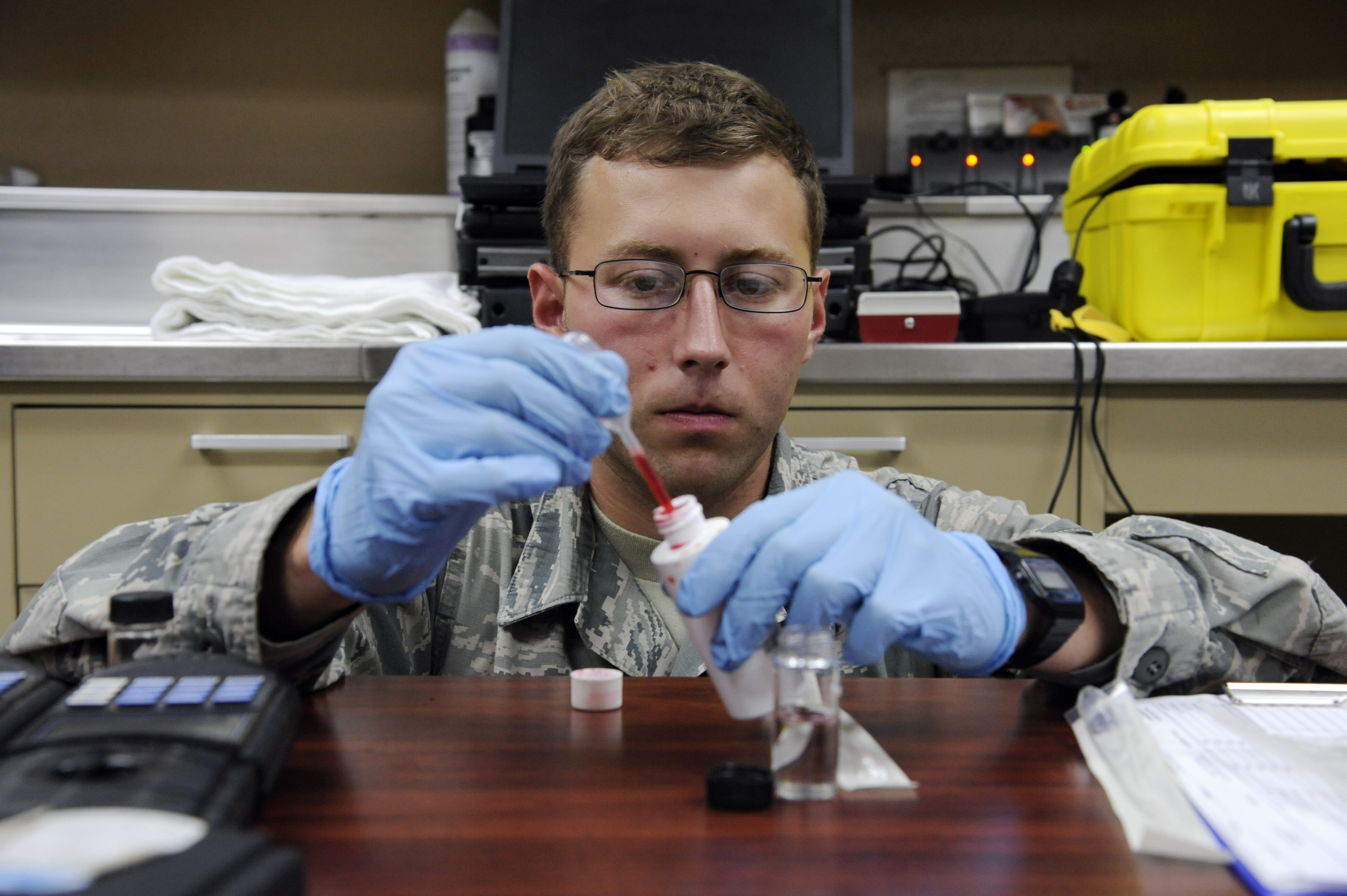
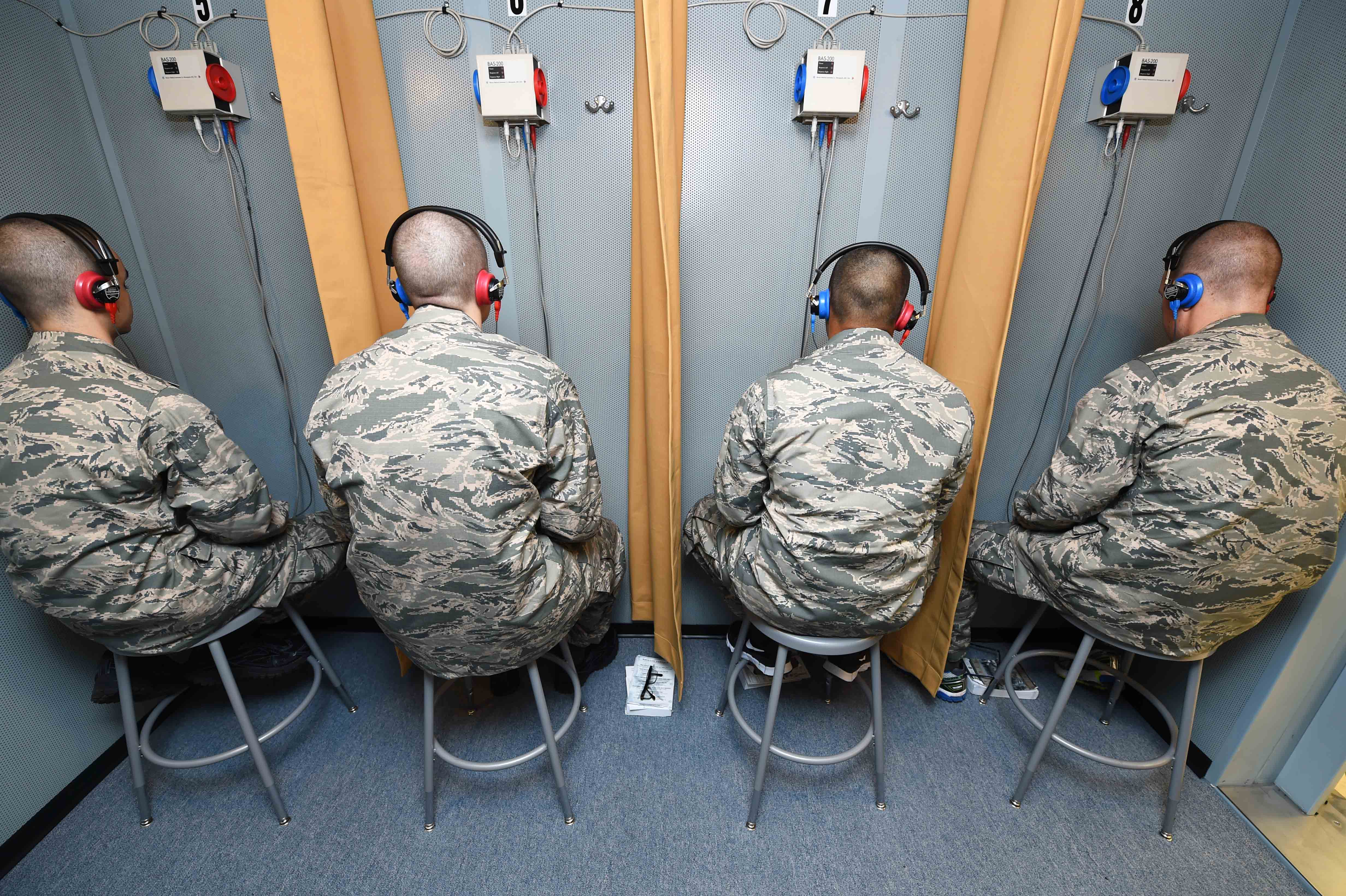

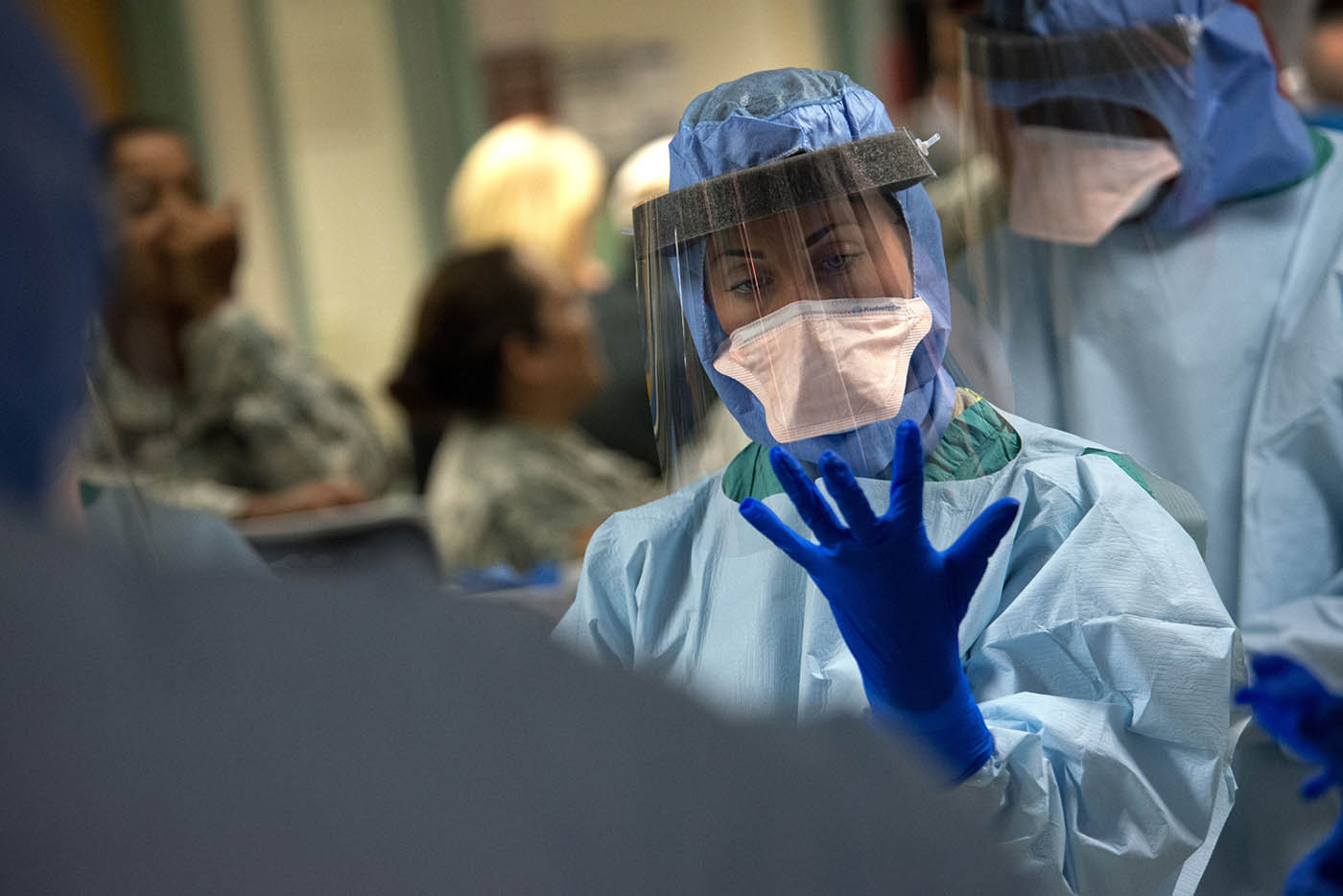
The 59th MDW is the Air Force's largest medical wing.

59th Dental Group

- 59th Dental Squadron
- 59th Dental Support Squadron
- 59th Dental Training Squadron

59th Medical Operations Group

- 59th Medical Support Squadron
- 59th Medical Operations Squadron
- 59th Surgical Operations Squadron
- 59th Mental Health Squadron
- 59th Radiology Squadron
- 59th Surgical Specialty Squadron
- 59th Diagnostics and Therapeutics Squadron
- 59th Laboratory Squadron
- 59th Pharmacy Squadron

59th Medical Support Group

- 59th Medical Support Squadron
- 59th Medical Logistics and Readiness Squadron

359th Medical Group (former 12th) at JBSA-Randolph

- 359th Aerospace Medicine Squadron
- 359th Dental Squadron
- 359th Medical Operations Squadron
- 359th Medical Support Squadron

559th Medical Group (former 37th) at JBSA-Lackland

- 559th Aerospace Medicine Squadron
- 559th Medical Operations Squadron

959th Medical Group (former 59th Inpatient Operations Group) at JBSA-Fort Sam Houston

- 959th Medical Operations Squadron
- 959th Inpatient Operations Squadron
- 959th Clinical Support Squadron

59th Training Group

- 381st Training Squadron
- 382nd Training Squadron
- 383rd Training Squadron
- 59th Training Support Squadron

Clinical Departments

- Anesthesiology
- Audiology
- Cardiology
- Otorhinolaryngology
- General Surgery
- Neurosurgery
- Ophthalmology
- Refractive Surgery
- Pediatrics
- Plastic Surgery
- Speech Pathology
- Urology
- Vascular Surgery
- Emergency Medicine
- Orthopedics
- Podiatry
- Occupational Therapy
- Physical Medicine
- Allergy-Immunology
- Cardiothoracic Surgery
- Dermatology
- Endocrinology
- Gastroenterology
- Hematology-Oncology
- Infectious Disease
- Internal Medicine
- Nephrology
- Neurology
- Pulmonary
- Rheumatology
- Mental Health
- Psychiatry
- Psychology
- Neonatology
- Obstetrics
- Gynecology
- Radiology
- Pathology
- Pharmacy
- Hyperbaric Medicine
- Nutritional Medicine
- General Dentistry
- Endodontic
- Oral-Maxillofacial
- Orthodontics
- Periodontics
- Prosthodontics
- Aerospace Medicine
- Preventative Medicine
- Trainee Health

Non-Clinical Departments

- Family Advocacy
- Health and Wellness Center (HAWC)
- Joint Commission on Accreditation of Healthcare Organizations (JCAHO)
- Team HELP
- Office of the Chief Scientist. The Chief Scientist collaborates with Service, Department of Defense, local, national and international government, academia and industry, research, development, test, evaluation and acquisition organizations. The Chief Scientist oversees and manages organizational needs, while developing solutions for medical care with an emphasis on mission aligned research in several different fields. These solutions enables researchers to exploit new knowledge while developing, evaluating, and integrating technologies to provide patient-centered care in the pre-hospital, in- and -out-patient environment, maintaining and restoring health, and training medical students to address mission challenges. The ST office supports clinical researchers at over 70 sites worldwide. The Wing Chief Scientist is also the official charged with the responsibility for the protection of human research subjects participating in research. Research Directorates under the Chief Scientist include:
  - Trauma & Clinical Care Research Program (TCCR)
  - Diagnostics & Therapeutics Program (D&T)
  - Clinical Investigations & Research Support (CIRS)
  - Nursing Research – Center for Clinical Inquiry (C2I)
  - Health Services Research
  - Technology Transition & Transfer/Office of Research and Technology Applications (ORTA)

The Chief Scientist's office also works with liaisons in the 59th Medical Wing to include for supporting Graduate Dental Education and Dental research at the Air Force Post-Graduate Dental School and Clinic, and the Dental Research and Consultative Service.

== History ==
=== World War II ===
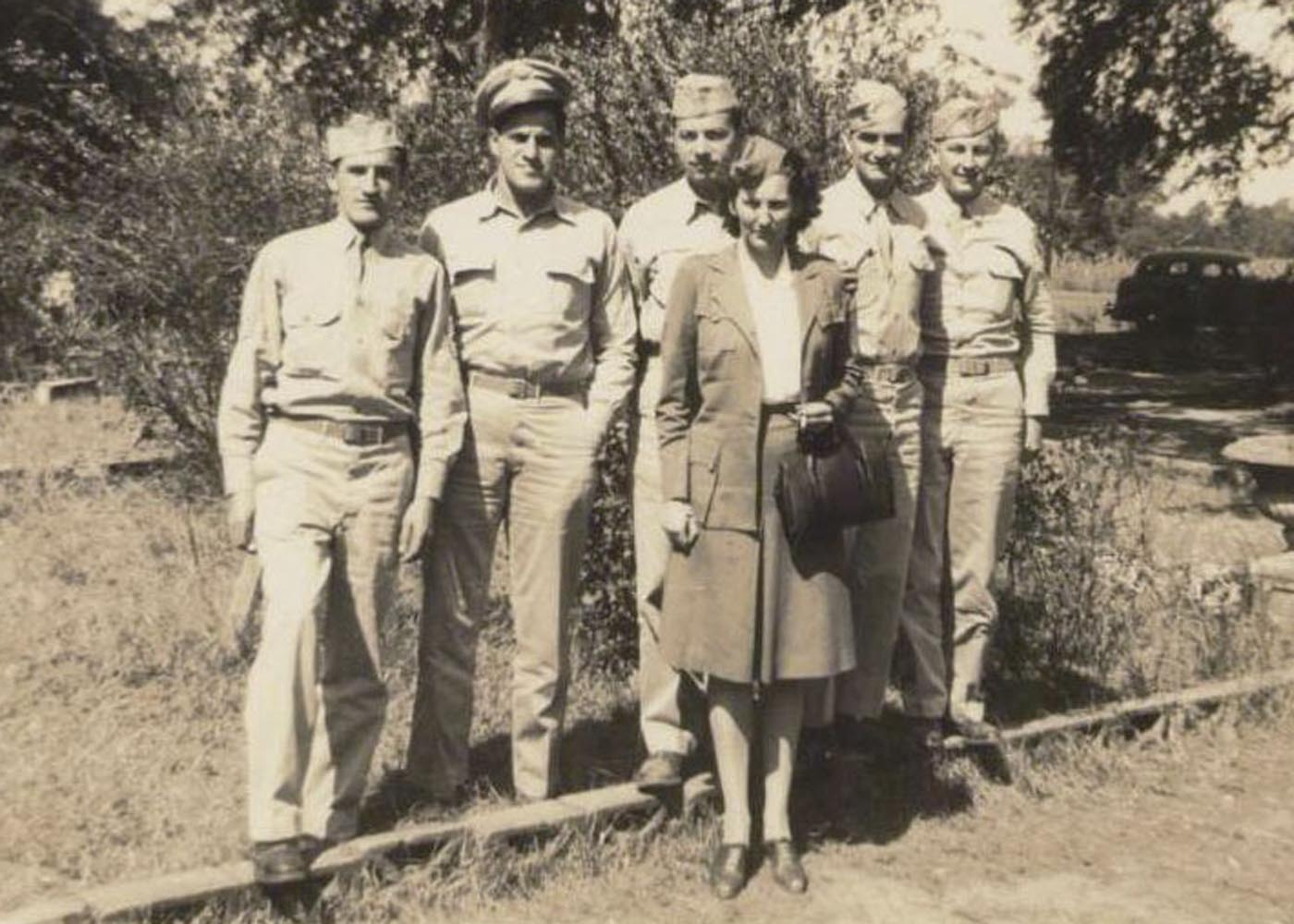
59th Fighter Group Army Air Corpsmen take a group photo at Thomasville Army Airfield, Ga.

The 59th Observation Group was established at Newark Airport, New Jersey, in 1941. It moved to Fort Dix Army Air Base, New Jersey, later in the year. Following the US entry into World War II the Group engaged in antisubmarine patrols along the East coast of the United States from December 1941 – October 1943. Initially during 1941–42 the Group operated a wide range of aircraft, including the BC-1A, L-59, O-46, O-47, O-49 Vigilant, and O-52 Owl During 1943 and 1944 the group trained pilots using P-39 Airacobra aircraft and later, in 1944, the Curtiss P-40 Warhawk as well. The unit was redesignated the 59th Reconnaissance Group on 2 April 1943, and again as the 59th Fighter Group on 11 August 1943. The 59th was disbanded on 1 May 1944. On 31 July 1985, the unit was redesignated the 59th Tactical Fighter Wing, but remained inactive. Finally, it was reactivated and consolidated with the Wilford Hall U.S. Air Force Hospital on 1 July 1993.

=== Lackland Air Force Base medical unit ===
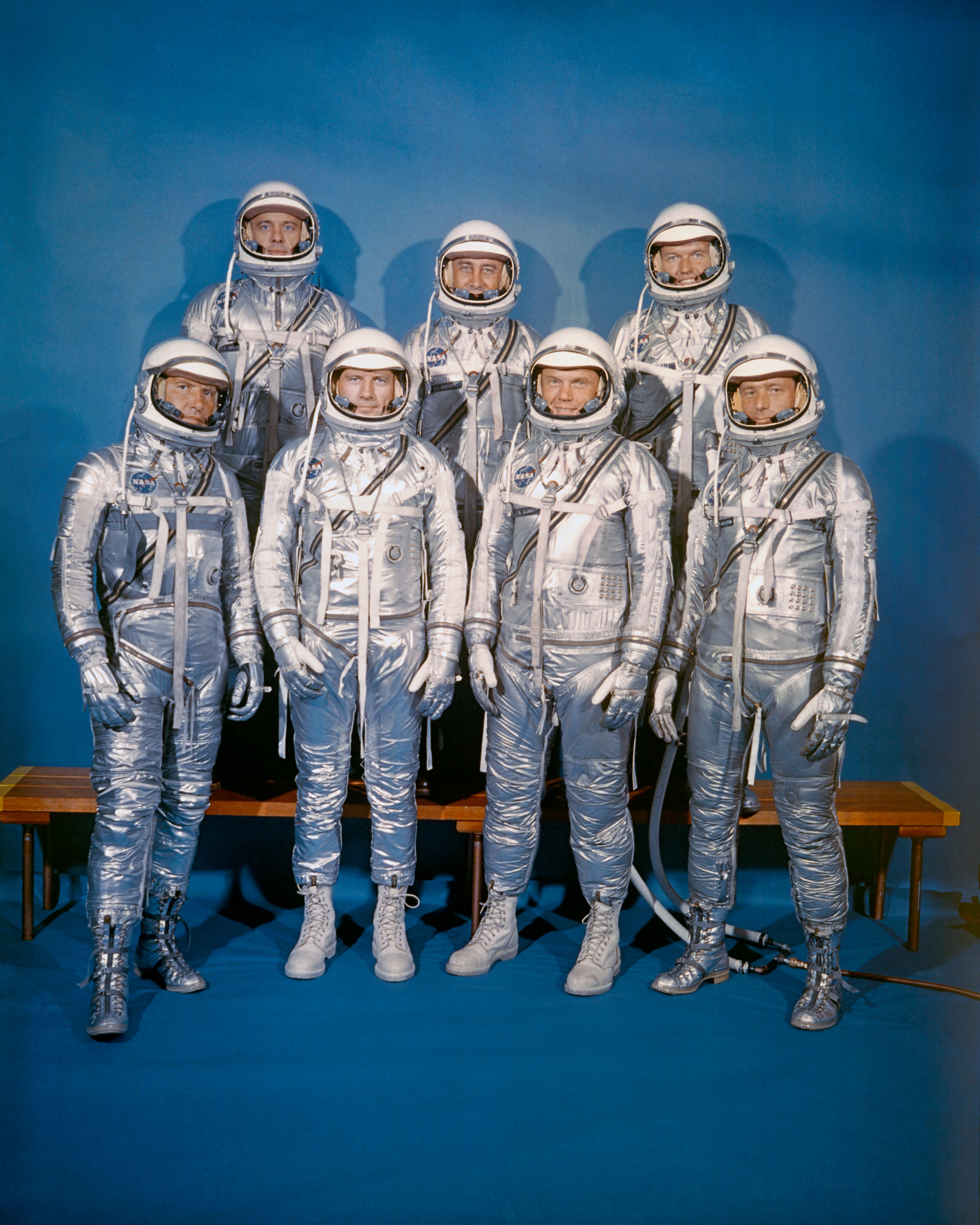
The Mercury Seven in 1960.

During the Korean War, the 3700th Medical Squadron developed a program to train basic trainees as medical corpsmen to ease shortage of medical personnel. Wilford Hall Medical Center as most people know it today came about during this time. With many Soldiers, Sailors, Airmen and Marines returning from the conflict needing medical attention, plans were drawn up to construct a new and larger medical facility which opened in 1957. It was in this first facility, most of which remains today, that the hospital participated in the first of what would become a long list of highlights of medicine, providing medical support to NASA's project Mercury.

From 1983, Wilford Hall offered centralized outpatient care, a clinical investigation facility, the Air Force's largest dispensary system, and the only eye bank and organ transplant centers. The hospital accomplished important research work in neonatal medicine, surgical transplants, orthopedic surgery, rheumatology, immunology, and maxillofacial surgery. Clinical investigations research kept the wing at the forefront of development of high-frequency ventilation and extra-corporeal membrane oxygenation; new techniques for the care of premature infants; improved cancer treatments; bone banking and transplantation; laser photocoagulation; and acquired immune deficiency syndrome (AIDS). In December 1989, it provided medical support to casualties returning from operations in Panama. From 4 January to 21 March 1991 Wilford Hall deployed over 900 personnel to RAF Little Rissington, England, to establish a 1500-bed hospital in support of expected casualties from the Gulf War. In 1993 the Medical Center was redesignated the 59th Medical Wing, taking the lineage of the never-active 59th Tactical Fighter Wing.

=== Closure and realignment ===
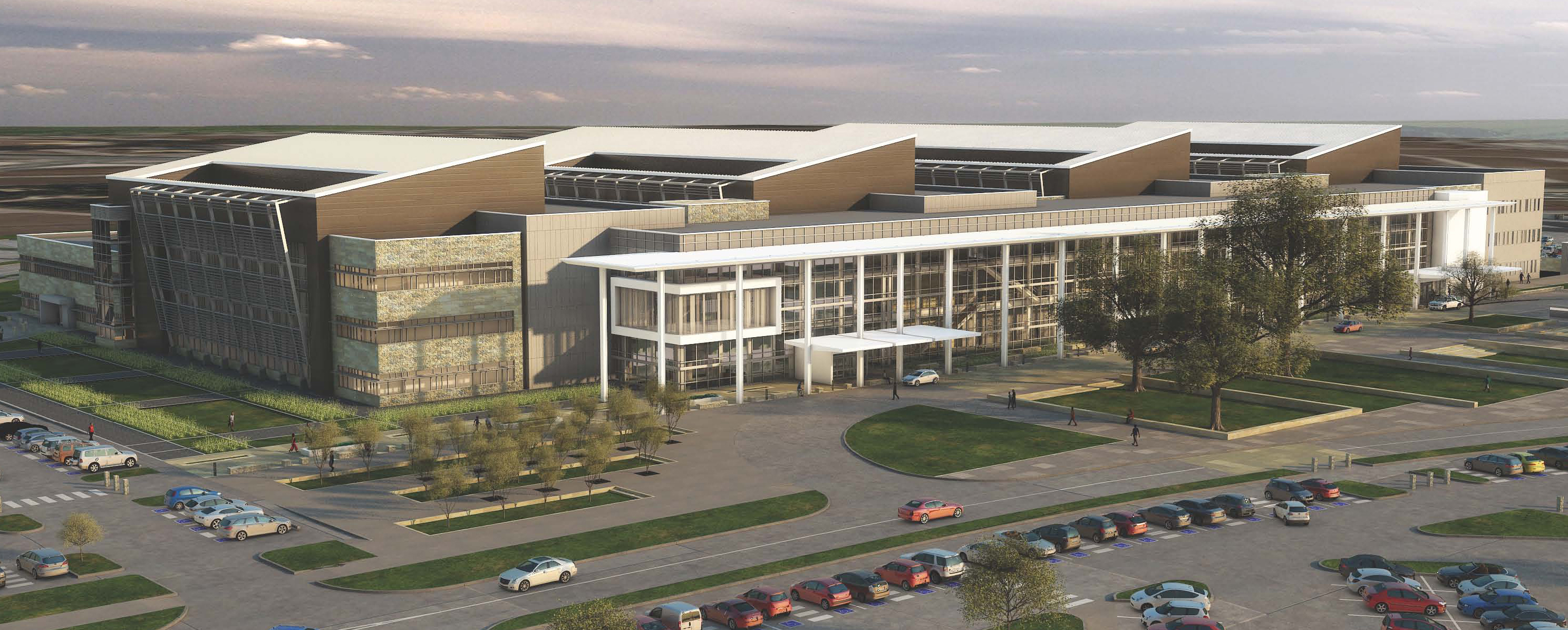
The new Wilford Hall Ambulatory Surgical Center is a $418 million, 682,000 square foot, state-of-the-art facility that will replace the existing building at Joint Base San Antonio-Lackland.

On 15 September 2011, the Wilford Hall Medical Center was officially renamed to the Wilford Hall Ambulatory Surgical Center, becoming the largest outpatient surgical center in the Air Force. Inpatient services are no longer provided at JBSA-Lackland, formerly Lackland Air Force Base, but are centralized at nearby San Antonio Military Medical Center – formerly known as Brooke Army Medical Center, or BAMC, at JBSA-Fort Sam Houston, Texas. Both facilities and all other military treatment facilities in the San Antonio area fall under the San Antonio Military Healthcare System (SAMHS). Construction is underway on a new 680,000 square-foot facility, which will be located adjacent to the existing building.

== Lineage ==
59th Tactical Fighter Wing

- Established as the 59th Observation Group on 21 August 1941

Activated on 1 September 1941
Inactivated on 18 October 1942

- Activated on 1 March 1943

Redesignated as 59th Reconnaissance Group on 2 April 1943
Redesignated as 59th Fighter Group on 11 August 1943
Disestablished on 1 May 1944

- Redesignated 59th Tactical Fighter Wing on 31 July 1985, but remained inactive
- Consolidated with Wilford Hall USAF Medical Center on 1 July 1993

59th Medical Wing

- Designated as the 3700th Medical Squadron on 25 August 1948

Organized on 26 August 1948
Redesignated 3700th Station Medical Squadron on 1 November 1948
Redesignated 3700th Medical Group on 27 June 1950
Redesignated 3700th USAF Hospital on 16 October 1953
Redesignated USAF Hospital, Lackland on 1 July 1958
Redesignated Wilford Hall USAF Hospital on 2 March 1963
Redesignated Wilford Hall USAF Medical Center on 1 July 1969

- Consolidated with the 59th Tactical Fighter Wing as 59th Medical Wing on 1 July 1993

=== Assignments ===
- I Air Support Command (later, I Ground Air Support Command), 1 September 1941
- First Air Force, 21 August – 18 October 1942
- Third Air Force, 1 March 1943
- III Fighter Command, by September 1943-1 May 1944
- 3700th Basic Training Wing, 26 August 1948
- Indoctrination Division, Air Training Command, 22 April 1949
- 3700th AF Indoctrination Wing (later, 3700th Military Training Wing; Lackland Military Training Center), 28 October 1948
- USAF Aerospace Medical Center, 1 October 1959 (attached to Aerospace Medical Division after 1 November 1961)
- Aerospace Medical Division, 15 April 1962
- Air Training Command, 15 January 1987
- Joint Military Medical Command, 16 February 1987
- Air Training Command (later, Air Education and Training Command), 1 October 1991
- Air Force Medical Command, 9 September 2025

=== Components ===
- 9th Observation Squadron (later 9th Reconnaissance Squadron, 488th Fighter Squadron): 29 March 1942 – 18 October 1942; 1 March 1943 – 1 May 1944
- 103d Observation Squadron: 1 September 1941 – 18 October 1942
- 104th Observation Squadron (later 104th Reconnaissance Squadron, 489th Fighter Squadron): 1 September 1941 – 18 October 1942; 1 March 1943 – 1 May 1944
- 119th Observation Squadron (later 119th Reconnaissance Squadron, 490th Fighter Squadron): attached December 1941; assigned 1 March 1943 – 1 May 1944
- 126th Observation Squadron(later, 126th Reconnaissance Squadron; 34th Photographic Reconnaissance Squadron): 1 September 1941 – 18 October 1942; 1 March – 11 August 1943.
- 447th Fighter Squadron: 20 November 1943 – 1 May 1944.

=== Stations ===
- Newark Airport, New Jersey, 1 September 1941
- Fort Dix Army Air Base, New Jersey, 14 November 1941 – 18 October 1942
- Fort Myers Army Air Field, Florida, 1 March 1943
- Thomasville Army Air Field, Georgia, c. 30 March 1943 – 1 May 1944
- Joint Base San Antonio-Lackland, Texas, 26 August 1948 – present

=== Aircraft ===
- BC-1A, 1941–1942
- O-59, 1941–1942
- O-46, 1941–1942
- O-47, 1941–1942
- O-49, 1941–1942
- O-52, 1941–1942
- P-39, 1943–1944
- P-40, 1944.
