= Edward D. Martin =

American doctor

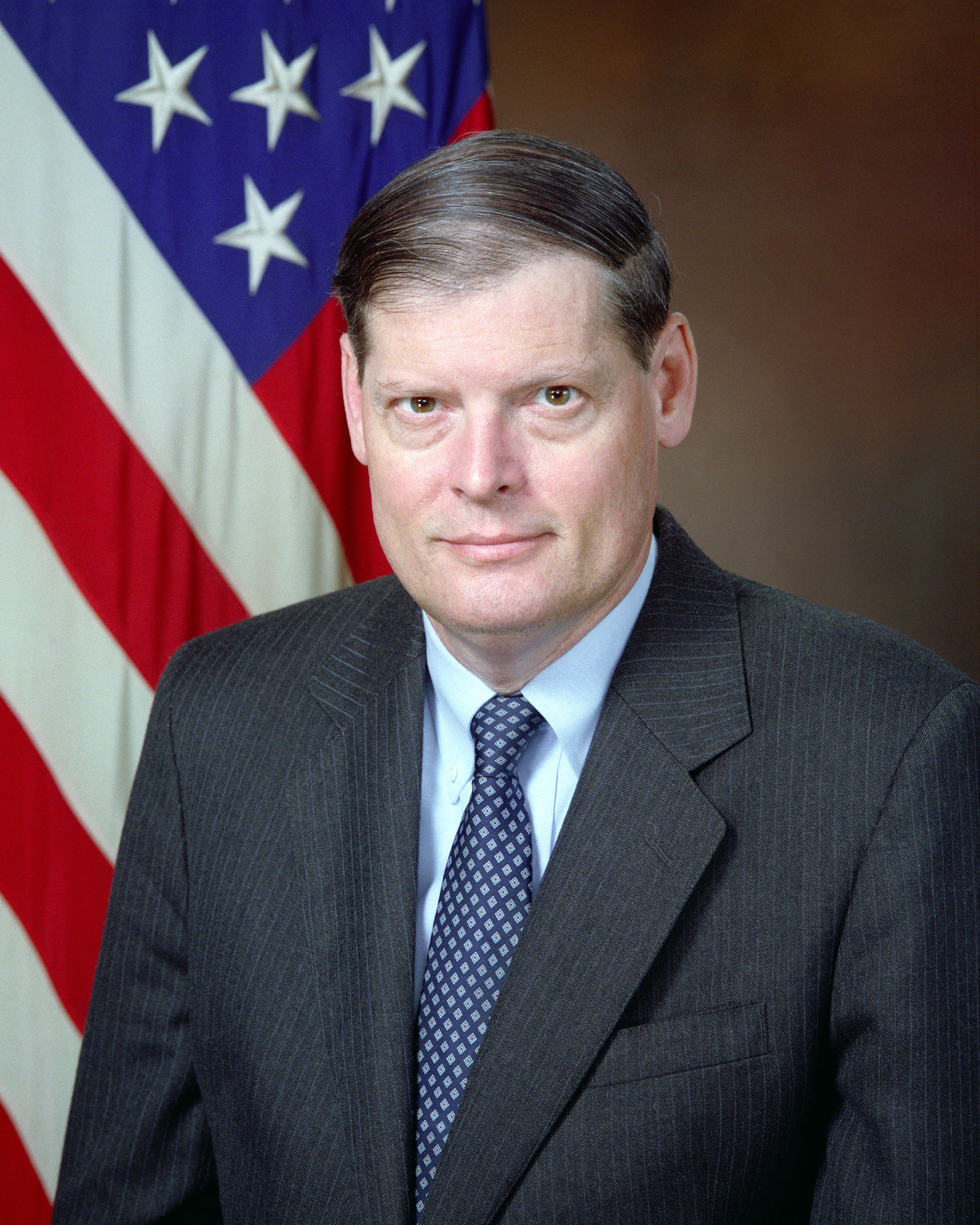
- Official portrait, 1993

United States Assistant Secretary of Defense for Health Affairs
- Acting; April 1, 1997 – February 28, 1998
- President: Bill Clinton
- Preceded by: Stephen C. Joseph
- Succeeded by: Gary Christopherson (acting)
- Acting; January 20, 1993 – March 23, 1994
- President: Bill Clinton
- Preceded by: Enrique Méndez Jr.
- Succeeded by: Stephen C. Joseph

Personal details
- Born: Edward Dana Martin Topeka, Kansas, U.S.
- Spouse: Kathi
- Education: University of Kansas
- Uniformed service
- Branch: U.S. Public Health Service Commissioned Corps
- Service years: 1975–1998
- Rank: Rear admiral (upper half)

Edward Dana Martin is an American doctor who is the former Acting Assistant Secretary of Defense (Health Affairs). He was appointed to two terms, originally in 1993 and again in 1997. Martin served as the Secretary's principal advisor on matters related to the military health system, health.mil. The Military Health System's (MHS) mission is to provide optimal health services in support of the United States' military mission.

== Background ==
A native of Topeka, Kansas, Martin served as a hospital corpsman in the U.S. Navy for five years after completing high school. He graduated from the University of Kansas in 1966 and the University of Kansas School of Medicine in 1970. Martin completed his residency in pediatrics at the Montefiore Hospital and Medical Center in the Bronx in 1973.

Martin arrived at the Pentagon in 1989 after 15 years of executive leadership positions with the Public Health Service. He served as Chief of Staff for C. Everett Koop, M.D., Surgeon General; Director, Bureau of Health Care Delivery and Assistance; Acting Deputy Administrator, Health Resources and Services Administration; and Director, Bureau of Community Health Services. Martin was commissioned in the Public Health Service in May 1975 and held the rank of Rear Admiral upon his retirement in April 1998.

After his retirement, Martin joined Science Applications International Corporation as a Senior Vice-President and Chief Medical Officer. He is currently the co-founder and chairman of Martin, Blanck & Associates, a company which he founded along with former Army Surgeon General Ronald R. Blanck.

== Personal life ==
Martin's previous marriages ended in divorce. Martin and his current wife, Kathi, have two sons.
