= Lester Martínez López =

American army general & government official (born 1955)

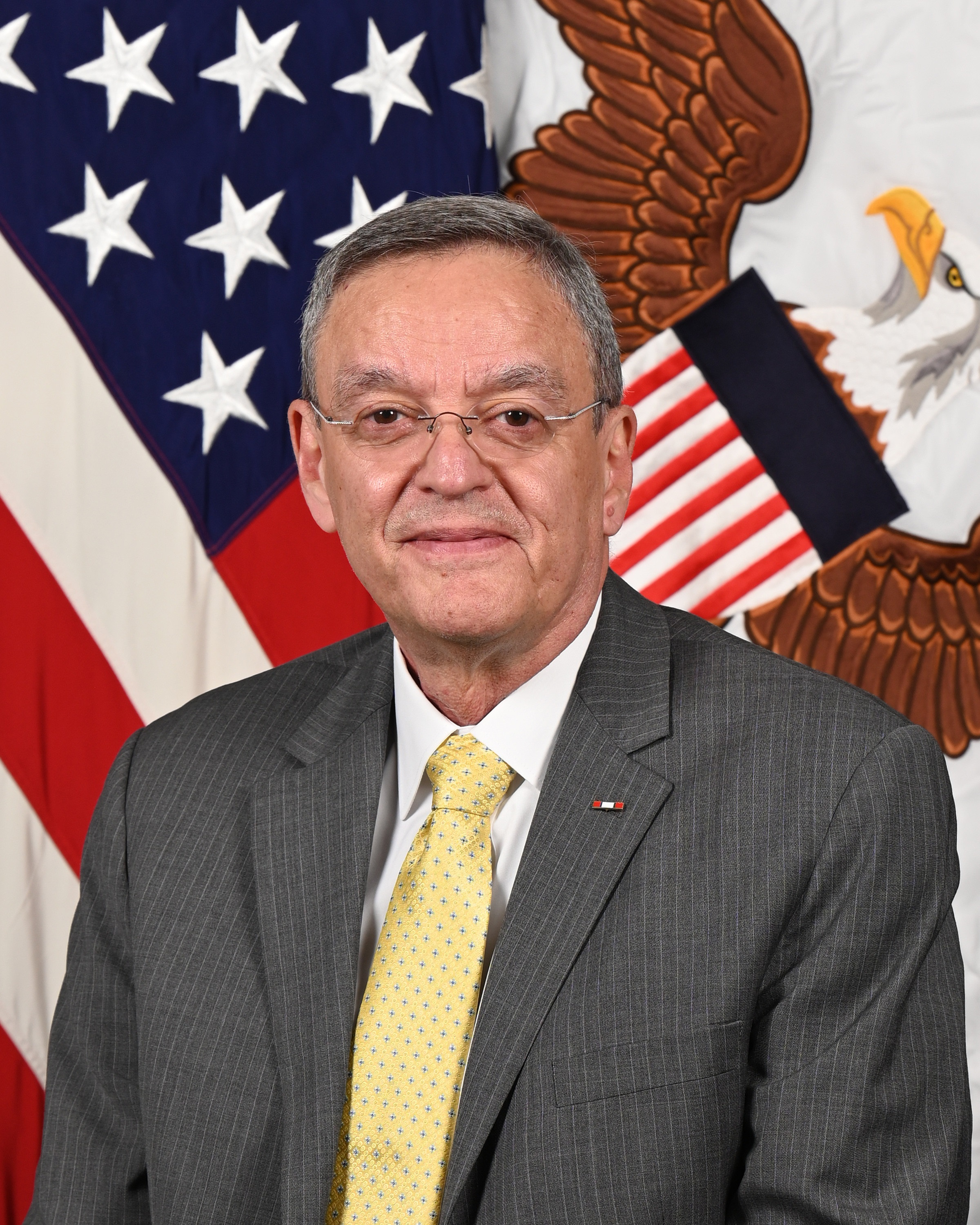
- Official portrait, 2023

Assistant Secretary of Defense for Health Affairs
- In office March 1, 2023 – October 31, 2024
- President: Joe Biden
- Secretary: Lloyd Austin
- Preceded by: Thomas P. McCaffery
- Succeeded by: Keith Bass

Personal details
- Born: 1955 (age 70–71) Mayagüez, Puerto Rico
- Education: Johns Hopkins Bloomberg School of Public Health (MPH); University of Puerto Rico School of Medicine (MD)

Military service
- Allegiance: United States
- Branch/service: United States Army
- Years of service: 1978–2005
- Rank: Major General
- Commands: Army Medical Research and Materiel Command
- Awards: Legion of Merit (3); Defense Meritorious Service Medal
- Martínez López's voice Martínez López at a Senate Appropriations Defense subcommittee hearing on military health programs Recorded March 7, 2023

Lester Martínez López (born 1955) is an American government official and former Army general who served as the Assistant Secretary of Defense for Health Affairs from March 2023 to October 2024. While in the United States Army, Martínez López was the first Hispanic to head the Army Medical and Research Command at Fort Detrick, Maryland. His responsibilities included overseeing the Army Medical Research Institute of Infectious Disease, which develops antidotes and vaccines for diseases soldiers might face on the battlefield.

== Early years ==
Martínez López was born in the city of Mayagüez, located on the western coast of Puerto Rico, but was raised and educated in the town of Maricao. In 1978, he graduated from the School of Medicine in the University of Puerto Rico School of Medicine.

== Military career ==
In 1978, Martínez López joined the United States Army and was sent to Fort Bragg in North Carolina, where he received his specialty training in family practice and commissioned as a Captain upon the completion of his training. He was part of a multinational force in the Sinai following the 1978 Camp David Accord. In 1983, he completed his MPH (Master of Public Health) degree at the Johns Hopkins Bloomberg School of Public Health with a focus in environmental health sciences. In 1995, Martínez López served as chief medical officer when U.S. forces were sent to Haiti, and three years later, in 1998, he oversaw military relief operations for 8,500 victims of Hurricane Mitch in Central America.

== U.S. Army Medical Research and Materiel Command ==
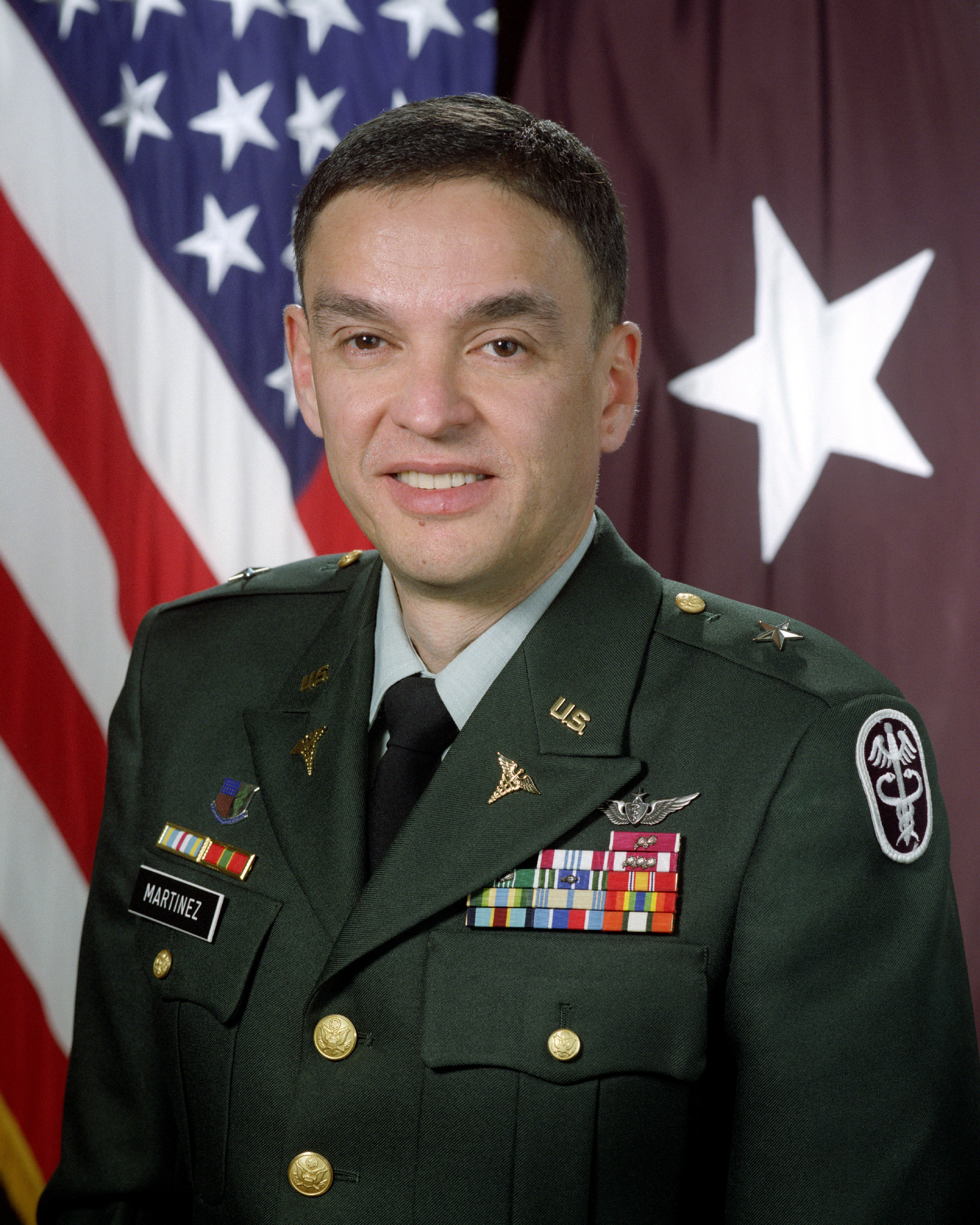
Lester Martínez López as a brigadier general

On March 22, 2002, Martínez López assumed the command of the U.S. Army Medical Research and Materiel Command. The command's research includes vaccines for dengue fever, anthrax and hepatitis; anti-virals for smallpox and countermeasures for environmental, biological and chemical hazards.

As commander of USAMRMC, Martínez López managed more than 4,600 civilian, military and contract facilities at the Army's six medical research laboratories across the country, which include the U.S. Army Medical Research Institute of Infectious Diseases, the Walter Reed Army Institute of Research, the U.S. Army Medical Research Institute of Chemical Defense, the U.S. Army Aeromedical Research Laboratory, the U.S. Army Institute of Surgical Research and the U.S. Army Research Institute of Environmental Medicine. Also under his command were more than half a dozen support centers through contracting, medical logistics management, health care facility planning and information technology management, included the Telemedicine and Advanced Technology Research Center (TATRC), the U.S. Army Medical Research Acquisition Activity and the U.S. Army Medical Materiel Agency.

=== USAMRMC Accomplishments ===
Among the major accomplishments of the USAMRMC while under his command are the following:

- The establishment of the Biodefense campus [the National Interagency Biodefense Campus] projects. The project provided all the drugs and equipment for the medics worldwide.
- The USAMRMC became the information management for the Army Medical Department. USAMRMC became one of the leaders in the country, if not the world, in telemedicine.

Martínez López wrote the keynote for "Biomaterials for Military Medical Needs. On May 19, 2004, Martínez López was the recipient of the 2004 "Woodrow Wilson Award for Distinguished Government Service" from the Johns Hopkins University Alumni Association at the Johns Hopkins Bloomberg School of Public Health. At the Delta Omega Honor Society induction ceremony, he was the keynote speaker. Martínez López has been featured on the cover of "U.S. Medicine" magazine and on the cover of the December 26, 2002 issue of "Military Medical Technology" magazine.

== Career after the U.S. Army ==
Martínez López retired from the U.S. Army in 2005 and was named the Senior Vice President & Administrator of Lyndon B. Johnson General Hospital Harris County Hospital District in Houston, Texas. He also served as the Chief Medical Officer at the Brandon Regional Hospital in Brandon, Florida. Martínez López belongs to various professional organizations, among them the American Board of Family Medicine and the American Board of Preventive Medicine. He is also a fellow of the American Academy of Family Physicians.

In 2019 Lester Martínez López was inducted to the Puerto Rico Veterans Hall of Fame.

== Nomination for Assistant Secretary of Defense for Health Affairs ==
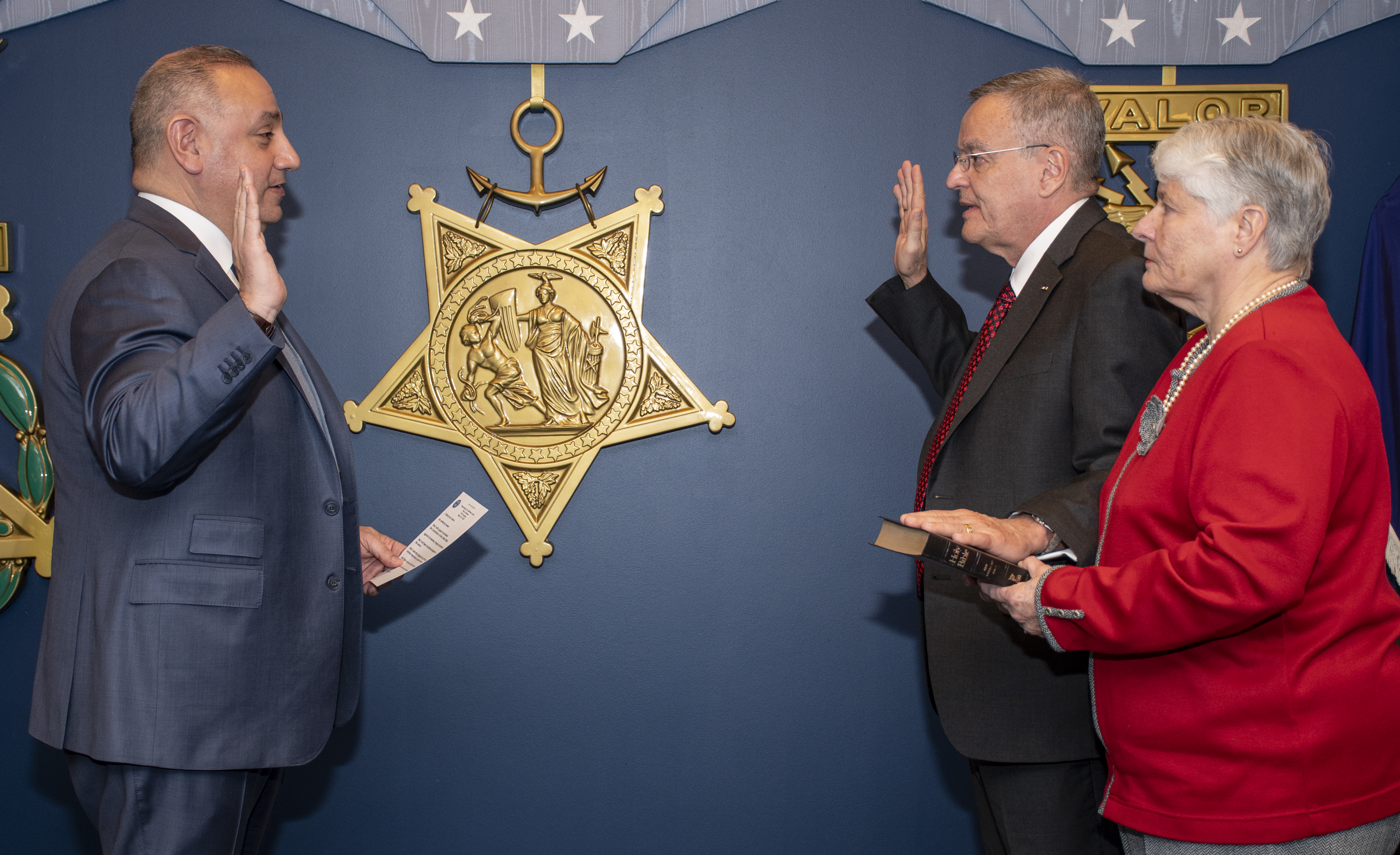
Martínez López is ceremonially sworn in as the assistant secretary of defense for health affairs by under secretary of defense for personnel and readiness Gil Cisneros on March 21, 2023.

On November 17, 2021, the White House announced that President Biden intends to nominate Lester Martínez López for the position of Assistant Secretary of Defense for Health Affairs. On January 10, 2022, the White House submitted the nomination to the U.S. Senate, where it was referred to the Committee on Armed Services. The committee held a hearing on the nomination on February 15, 2022, and favorably reported the nomination to the full Senate on March 8, 2022. However, that nomination was stalled and returned to the President on January 3, 2023. He was renominated that same day and was submitted to the Senate. On February 2, 2023, his nomination was advanced to the Senate floor. On February 15, 2023, the United States Senate invoked cloture on his nomination by a 64–33 vote. On February 16, 2023, his nomination was confirmed by a 61–34 vote.

== Military awards and recognitions ==
Among Major General Martínez López's military awards and recognition's are the following:

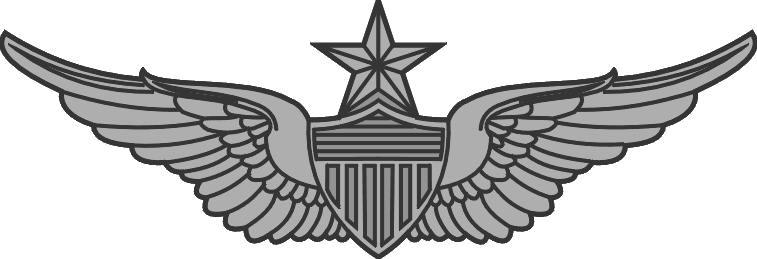
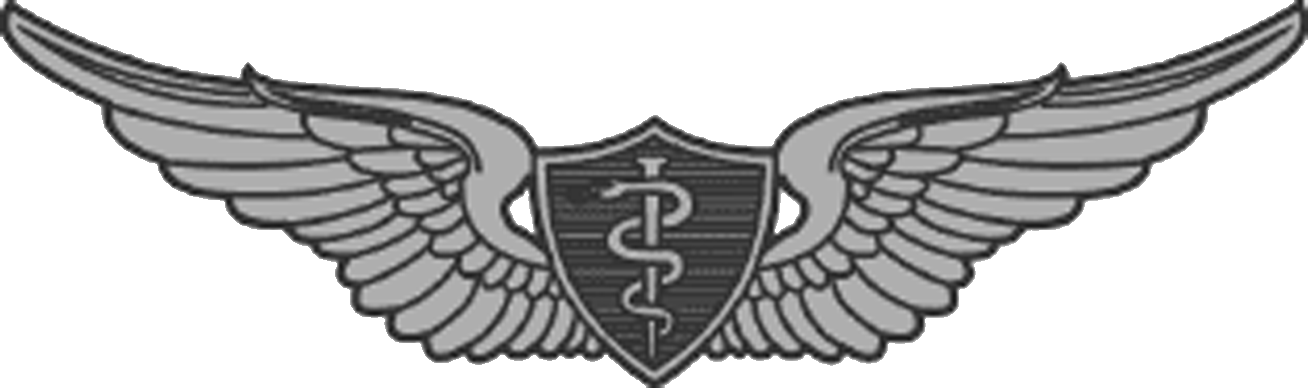
Senior Flight Surgeon Badge

Legion of Merit with two oak leaf clusters
Defense Meritorious Service Medal
Meritorious Service Medal with three oak leaf clusters
Army Commendation Medal with one oak leaf cluster
Army Achievement Medal with one oak leaf cluster
Joint Meritorious Unit Award
Army Superior Unit Award
National Defense Service Medal with one bronze service star
Armed Forces Service Medal
Armed Forces Reserve Medal
Army Service Ribbon
Army Overseas Service Ribbon
Multinational Force and Observers Medal

== See also ==
- List of Puerto Ricans
- List of Puerto Rican military personnel
