= William E. Mayer =

U.S. Government official

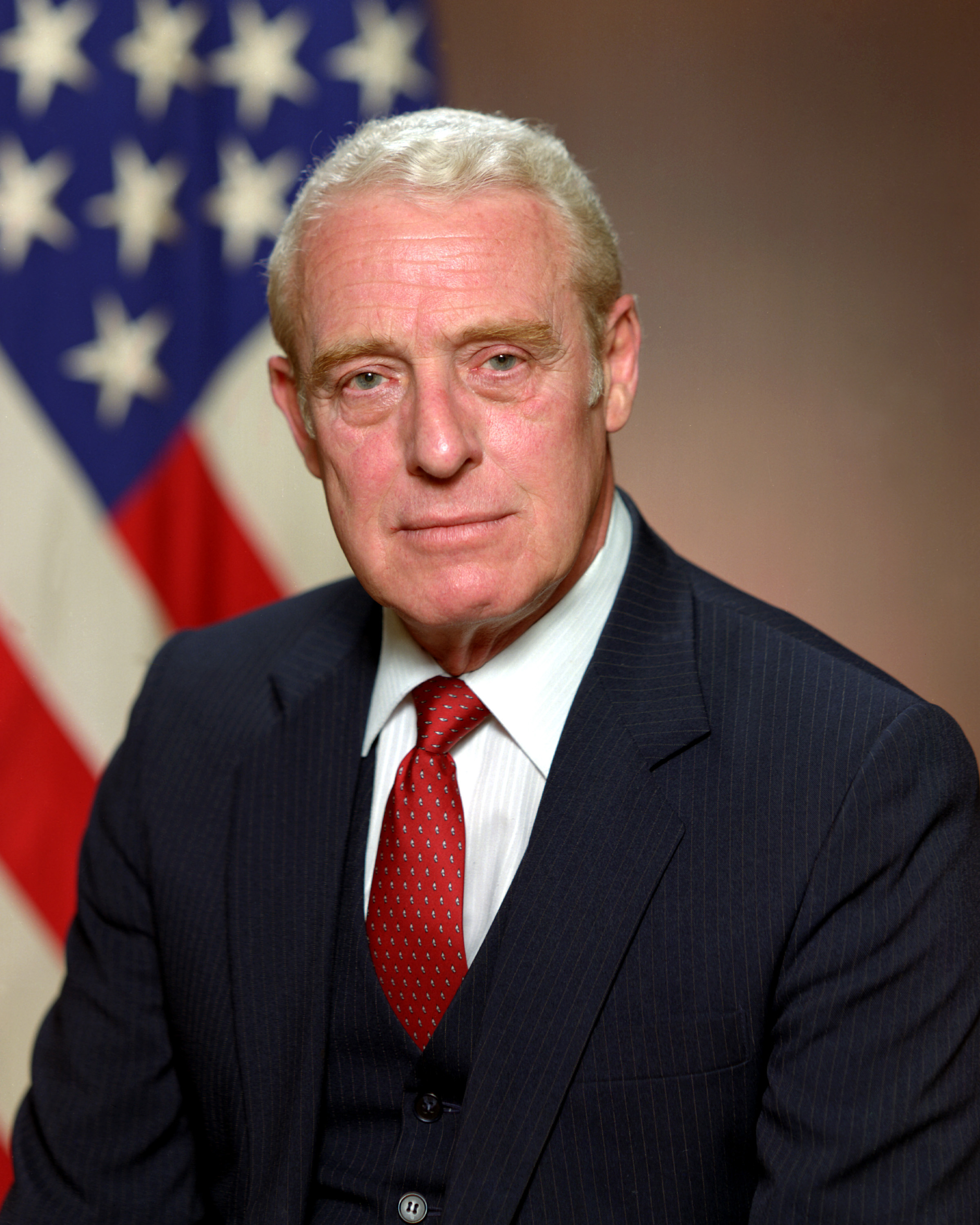

Assistant Secretary of Health and Human Services for Mental Health and Substance Use
- In office 1981–1983
- President: Ronald Reagan

Assistant Secretary of Defense for Health Affairs
- In office 1983–1989
- President: Ronald Reagan

Director of the California Department of Health
- In office 1973–1975

Director of the California Department of Mental Health
- In office 1971–1973

Personal details
- Born: September 24, 1923 Chicago, Illinois
- Died: February 10, 2010 (aged 86) Tacoma, Washington
- Party: Republican
- Education: University of Washington (B.S., 1943); Northwestern University (M.D., 1947)

William Erwin Mayer (September 24, 1923 – February 10, 2010) was an American government official who served as the Alcohol, Drug Use and Mental Health Administrator from 1981 to 1983. He also served as the Assistant Secretary of Defense for Health Affairs from 1983 to 1989.

== Career ==
Mayer was born in 1923 and his parents where dentists. He went to school at University of Washington, Northwestern University Medical School, and the University of California Medical Center in San Francisco. While still in medical school, he joined the United States Navy in 1946. Mayer served in the Navy Medical Corps and was assigned to the 1st Marine Division as a medical officer during the Korean War, receiving a bronze star with valor. He transferred to the U.S. Army Medical Corps in 1952. Mayer was then assigned as a psychiatrist to work with Korea prisoners of war and received a second bronze star. After the war, he became a leading expert on communist brainwashing techniques. Mayer retired from military service in 1958.

Mayer also was Director of Health, Director of the International Forum on AIDS Research at the National Academy of Sciences and was the US Assistant surgeon general of the United States.

Before he was administrator for Alcohol, Drug use and Substance Abuse, he was the chief medical officer at the San Diego health department. Prior to that, he served as the Director of the California Department of Health from 1973 to 1975, as well as the Director of the California Department of Mental Health from 1971 to 1973. Mayer also administered public health to those in Humboldt, Contra Costa and Del Norte counties in California.

As President Reagan's Assistant Secretary of Defense for Health Affairs, Mayer was an advocate for joint commands for military medical training and care. He created the short-lived Joint Military Medical Command between the Air Force and the Army in San Antonio, Texas. His idea failed at the time but was revived in 2005 by the Base Realignment and Closure (BRAC) and became the San Antonio Military Medical Center (SAMMC).
