= A. Cornelius Baker =

American HIV/AIDS activist (1961–2024)

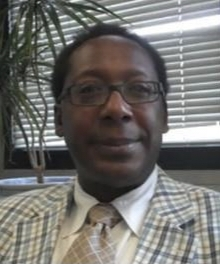
- Baker in 2010

Confidential Assistant to the Assistant Secretary for Health
- In office October 1989 – May 1992
- President: George H. W. Bush
- Assistant Secretary: James O. Mason

Personal details
- Born: Antonio Cornelius Baker; September 30, 1961 Sodus, New York, U.S.
- Died: November 8, 2024 (aged 63) Washington, D.C., U.S.
- Domestic partner: Gregory Nevins (from 2004)
- Education: Eisenhower College
- Occupation: Public health advocate; policy expert; HIV/AIDS activist

Antonio Cornelius Baker (September 30, 1961 – November 8, 2024) was an American public health advocate and policy expert who worked in HIV/AIDS prevention, care, and advocacy. He held leadership roles in organizations such as the National Association of People with AIDS and Whitman-Walker Clinic and contributed to global health initiatives through his work with the U.S. Department of State and the President's Emergency Plan for AIDS Relief (PEPFAR). He served as Confidential Assistant to the Assistant Secretary for Health from 1989 to 1992.

== Early life and education ==
Baker was born on September 30, 1961, in Sodus, New York. He spent part of his early childhood in Apopka, Florida, raised by his maternal grandmother, Fannie Baker, before moving to Syracuse, New York, to live with his mother, Shirley Baker, who worked as a social worker and family services coordinator for New York State Correctional Services. His father was Adel Robinson.

Baker pursued an education in comparative literature with a focus on theater at Eisenhower College. During his studies, he completed internships in cultural institutions, including at the Kennedy Center, and earned a B.A. in 1983.

== Career ==
Baker was an arts editor for Washington City Paper in 1983. Around the same time, he became involved in LGBTQ movements and public health advocacy, raising funds for local gay organizations such as Brother, Help Thyself.

In 1985, Baker worked as an executive assistant to Carol Schwartz, a member of the D.C. City Council, where he developed his skills in public administration and policy. By 1989, he joined the White House Presidential Personnel Office under U.S. president George H. W. Bush and later moved to the U.S. Department of Health and Human Services, contributing to national AIDS programs. Baker served as Confidential Assistant to the Assistant Secretary for Health from 1989 to 1992.

In 1992, Baker became policy director at the National Association of People with AIDS, eventually rising to the position of executive director. His tenure included the establishment of National HIV Testing Day on June 27, an effort to destigmatize testing and integrate it into routine healthcare practices. From 1999 to 2004, he served as executive director of the Whitman-Walker Clinic, addressing both the clinic's financial difficulties and his own health challenges while continuing to expand access to HIV/AIDS care.

Baker's later roles included serving as an adviser to the National Black Gay Men's Advocacy Coalition and holding a position at the U.S. Department of State's Office of the U.S. Global AIDS Coordinator and Health Diplomacy, where he contributed to President's Emergency Plan for AIDS Relief (PEPFAR) initiatives aimed at addressing the global HIV/AIDS epidemic. He also worked with the National Institutes of Health's Office of AIDS Research and participated in the Presidential Advisory Council on HIV/AIDS. Additionally, he held board positions with organizations such as Broadway Cares/Equity Fights AIDS and the Elizabeth Taylor AIDS Foundation.

== Personal life and death ==
Baker, who identified as gay, was diagnosed as HIV-positive during the early years of the AIDS epidemic. His long-term partner was Gregory Nevins, a senior counsel at Lambda Legal, whom he was together with for 20 years.

Baker died from hypertensive atherosclerotic cardiovascular disease at his home in Washington, D.C., on November 8, 2024, at the age of 63.
