= Agwunobi =

Agwunobi is a Nigerian surname. Notable people with the surname include:

- Andrew Agwunobi (born 1965), American physician and administrator
- John O. Agwunobi (fl. 2000), Scottish-born Nigerian-American public health official, pediatrician, and businessperson
