= Public Health Service Response Service Award =

Decoration of the US Public Health Service

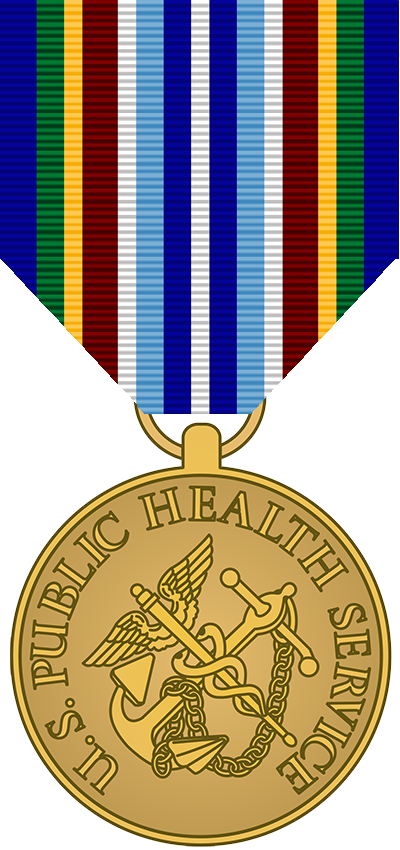
- Type: Service award
- Awarded for: Participation in a deployment for a public health need or National Special Security Event
- Country: United States
- Presented by: United States Public Health Service
- Eligibility: Members of the United States Public Health Service Commissioned Corps
- Ribbon

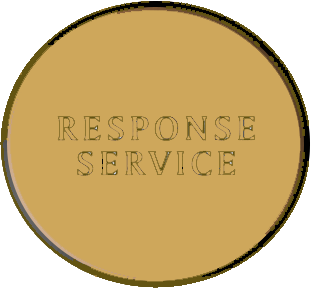
- Reverse

Precedence
- Next (higher): Global Response Service Award
- Next (lower): National Emergency Preparedness Award

The Public Health Service Response Service Award is a decoration of the United States Public Health Service presented to members of the United States Public Health Service Commissioned Corps. It recognizes deployments to meet a public health need or to support a National Special Security Event.

== Criteria ==
The PHS Response Service Award is awarded to officers who participate directly in a USPHS Commissioned Corps deployment to a designated public health need or National Special Security Event. An officer may receive only one award of the Response Service Award for participation in the same response.

To qualify for the award, an officer must participate in a USPHS Commissioned Corps deployment that is classified as one of the following:

- An all-hazards public health emergency as declared by the President of the United States or the United States Secretary of Health and Human Services;
- An urgent public health need as determined by the U.S. Secretary of Health and Human Services or the Assistant Secretary for Health; or
- A National Special Security Event.

To meet the criteria for the Response Service Award the event must:

- Not be designated as a response making the officer eligible for a Public Health Service Crisis Response Service Award or Public Health Service Global Response Service Award; and
- Be designated as a USPHS Commissioned Corps deployment with eligibility for the Response Service Award by the U.S. Secretary of Health and Human Services, the Assistant Secretary for Health, or the Surgeon General of the United States.

To qualify for the award, an officer also must deploy in the designated PHS uniform, unless the Surgeon General exempts him or her from the uniform requirement, and be deployed for at least seven consecutive days.

== See also ==
- Awards and decorations of the Public Health Service
- Awards and decorations of the United States government
