= Robert Windom =

American physician

United States Assistant Secretary for Health and Human Services
- In office 1986–1989
- Preceded by: Edward Brandt, Jr.
- Succeeded by: James O. Mason

Personal details
- Born: Robert Emerson Windom; July 14, 1930 Columbus, Ohio, U.S.
- Died: October 21, 2016 (aged 86) Sarasota, Florida, U.S.

Robert Emerson Windom (July 14, 1930 – October 21, 2016) was an American physician who served as the United States Assistant Secretary for Health and Human Services under President Ronald Reagan from 1986-89.

Windom graduated from Duke University with a B.A. in 1952, and obtained an M.D. in 1956. In 1970, he was appointed Clinical Associate professor of internal medicine at University of South Florida College of Medicine, and has been a Clinical professor of internal medicine at the same university since 1981.

He was married with three children, and lived in Sarasota, Florida at the time of his death. He died on October 21, 2016, aged 86.
