= Philip R. Lee =

American physician (1924–2020)

Philip Randolph Lee
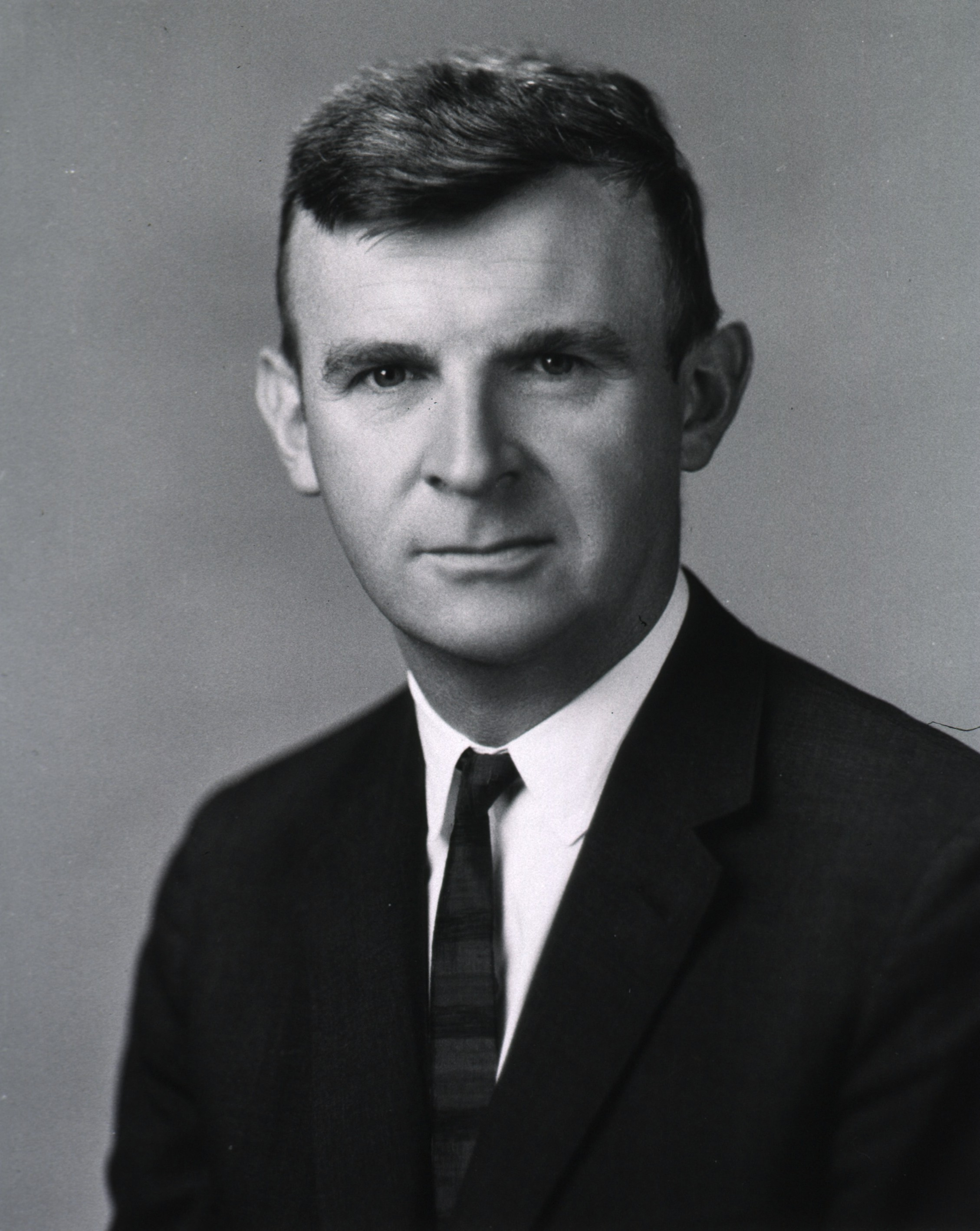

United States Assistant Secretary for Health and Human Services
- In office 1965–1969
- Appointed by: Lyndon Johnson
- Preceded by: Position established
- Succeeded by: Roger O. Egeberg
- In office 1993–1998
- Preceded by: James O. Mason
- Succeeded by: David Satcher

Personal details
- Born: April 17, 1924 San Francisco, California, U.S.
- Died: October 27, 2020 (aged 96) New York City, New York U.S.
- Spouse(s): Catherine Lockridge (m. 1953-1975); Carroll Estes (m. 1980-1996); Roz Lasker (m. 2008)
- Children: Dorothy Lee, Paul Lee, Amy Lee Pinneo, Margaret Lee, Theodore Lee, Duskie Estes (step-daughter)
- Education: Stanford University (A.B., M.D.); University of Minnesota (M.S.)
- Profession: academic, physician

Military service
- Allegiance: United States
- Branch/service: United States Navy
- Years of service: 1949–1951
- Rank: Lieutenant (Junior Grade)

Philip Randolph Lee (April 17, 1924 – October 27, 2020) was an American physician who served as the United States Assistant Secretary for Health and Scientific Affairs under President Lyndon B. Johnson from 1965 to 1969 and President Bill Clinton from 1993 to 1998.

Lee came from a family of doctors. His father, Dr. Russel Van Arsdale Lee, was known for founding the Palo Alto Medical Clinic (now part of the Palo Alto Medical Foundation). Lee's oldest brother, Dr. Richard Stanford Lee, practiced obstetrics and gynecology at the Palo Alto Clinic. The next oldest sibling, Dr. Peter Van Arsdale Lee Sr., became Dean at the University of Southern California Keck School of Medicine. Lee's younger brother, Dr. Hewlett Lee, was a surgeon at the Palo Alto Clinic. The youngest sibling, Dr. Margo Lee Paulsen, worked in family planning. Also, brother-in-law Bill Lutgens was a physician in San Francisco, California.

At the age of 19, Lee joined the V-12 Navy College Training Program at UCLA. Next, he served as a hospital corpsman for 6 months at the Oak Knoll Naval Hospital. He earned his accelerated bachelor degree with just 2 1/2 years of pre-med studies at Stanford University in 1945. Lee continued at Stanford after World War II in the School of Medicine. At that time, the first year of medical school consisted of medical science coursework. The next two years were clinical training at the Stanford Hospital in San Francisco. He earned his medical degree in 1948.

Following service in the Navy, including a tour of duty in the Korean War, he also did postdoctoral education at the Institute of Physical Medicine and Rehabilitation at New York University Medical Center and University of Minnesota at the Mayo Clinic. He returned home to California, and joined the Palo Alto Clinic, where he worked as an internist. In 1963, he decided to go into public service. Prior to his appointment to Assistant Secretary for Health and Scientific Affairs within the US Department of Health, Education and Welfare (HEW) in 1965, he served as director of health services for the U.S. State Department’s Agency for International Development. From 1972 to 1993, he was director of the University of California San Francisco Institute for Health Policy Studies; previously from 1969 to 1971, he had served as chancellor of that university.

Lee returned home again to California. He resumed his scholarly research at the Institute for Health Policy Studies. At the same time he taught graduate seminars in Health Policy at Stanford. After retiring, he and his wife moved to Manhattan. He died in New York City in October 2020 at the age of 96.
