= Public Health Service National Emergency Preparedness Award =

Decoration of the U.S. Public Health Service

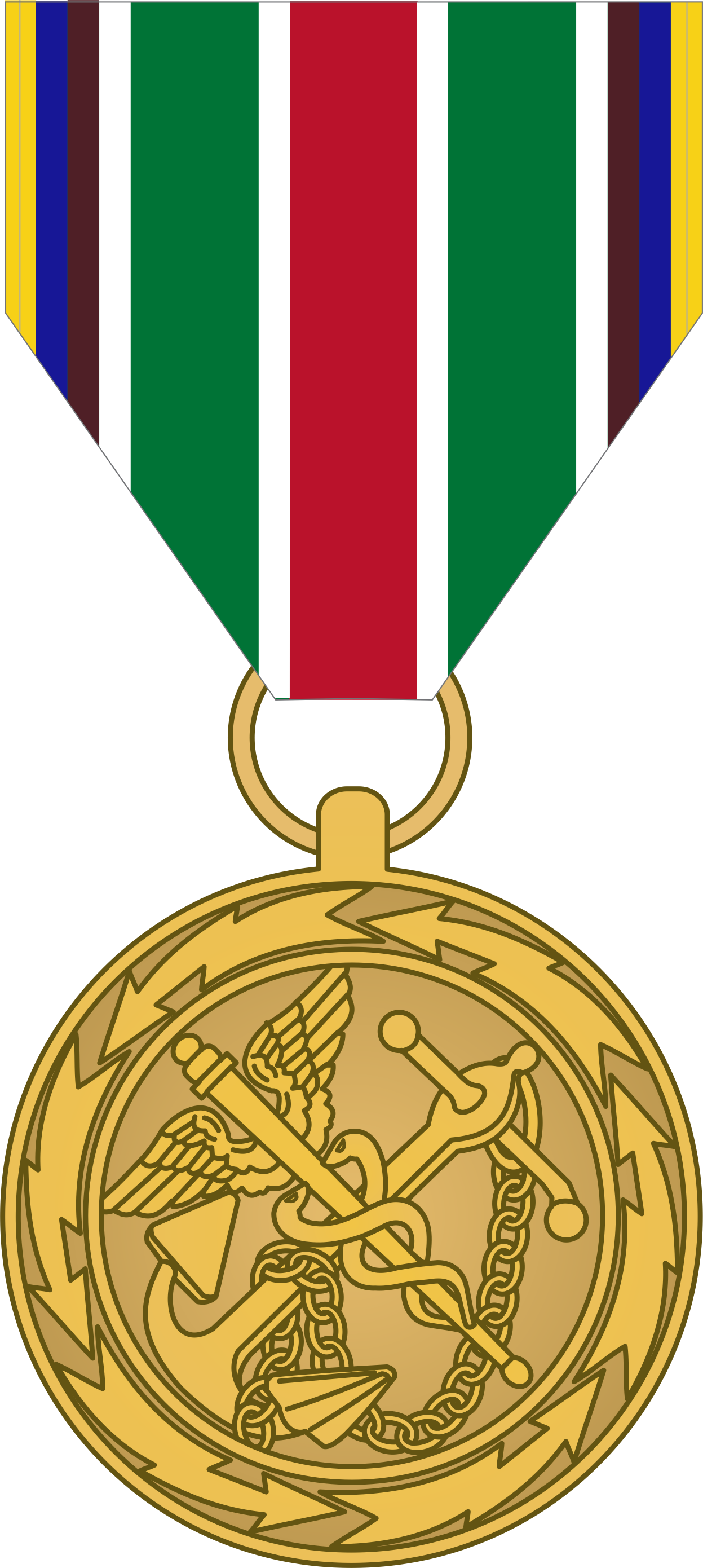
- Type: Service award
- Awarded for: Provision of emergency medical or support services
- Country: United States
- Presented by: United States Public Health Service
- Eligibility: Members of the United States Public Health Service Commissioned Corps
- Ribbon

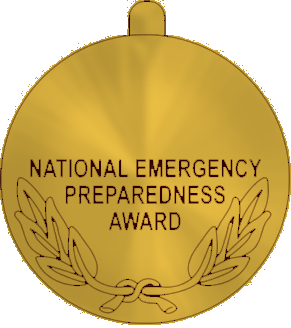
- Reverse

Precedence
- Next (higher): Response Service Award
- Next (lower): Recruitment Service Award

The Public Health Service National Emergency Preparedness Award is a decoration of the United States Public Health Service presented to members of the United States Public Health Service Commissioned Corps. It recognizes service to provide emergency medical or support services between 2006 and 2019.

== Criteria ==
The PHS National Emergency Preparedness Award is awarded to officers who served at any time from 19 December 2006 through 31 December 2019 in an organizational entity whose mission was to provide emergency medical or support services. An officer is eligible for the award if he or she:

- successfully served for at least two consecutive years as an active member of a USPHS Commissioned Corps-managed Rapid Deployment Unit or previously recognized Tier 1 or Tier 2 team and meets the eligibility criteria for the award as defined by the Surgeon General of the United States; or
- was detailed or assigned by personnel orders for one continuous year to the United States Department of Health and Human Services Assistant Secretary for Preparedness and Response or to the USPHS Commissioned Corps Headquarters Readiness and Deployment Branch.

An officer is authorized to receive only one National Emergency Preparedness Award during his or her career.

== See also ==
- Awards and decorations of the Public Health Service
- Awards and decorations of the United States government
