= Cristina Beato =

United States Assistant Secretary for Health

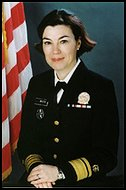
- Beato, c. 2004

Assistant Secretary for Health
- Acting
- In office February 5, 2003 – January 4, 2006
- President: George W. Bush
- Preceded by: Eve Slater
- Succeeded by: Admiral John O. Agwunobi

Personal details
- Born: Cuba
- Citizenship: United States
- Education: University of New Mexico (BS, MD, Residency)

Military service
- Allegiance: United States
- Service: U.S. Public Health Service
- Rank: Rear Admiral

Cristina Beato is a doctor and public health professional. Notably, under George W. Bush's presidency, she oversaw the United States Public Health Service.

== Early life ==
Beato was born in Cuba. As a child, she left Cuba on a Red Cross Humanitarian flight due to health issues. She was taken to Miami, where she was treated and inspired to go into medicine. Following that, her family moved to Panama, where Beato attended a French nun's school. When she was fourteen, Beato moved to New Mexico. Although she was offered several scholarships, Beato chose to go to the University of New Mexico for college to stay near her sick mother. She completed her bachelor's in biology, medical degree and residency at University of New Mexico School of Medicine. During her medical residency Beato instituted the first formal medical community outreach program for abused, neglected, and abandoned children at the All Faiths Receiving Home in Albuquerque.

== Career ==
After graduating, Beato worked at the New Mexico Youth Diagnostic and Development Center and as an emergency room physician at the Veterans' Administration Hospital and became the associate dean for clinical affairs and medical director of the University of New Mexico. She was the first woman to serve in that position.

In 2003, President Bush named Beato as the Assistant Secretary of the United States Public Health Service. Her nomination was followed by controversy based on questions surrounding her resume, which she claimed was due to a language barrier.

After leaving that position, Beato worked as deputy director of the Pan American Health Organization and senior advisor on international nutrition policy at the Food and Drug Administration. She now works with PwC on health related research.

== Personal life ==
Beato has two children who she raised as a single mother.
