= Public Health Service Recruitment Service Award =

Decoration of the U.S. Public Health Service

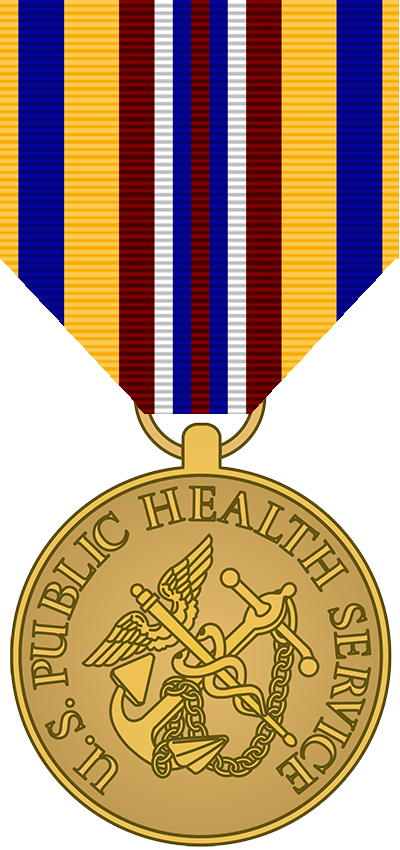
- Type: Service award
- Awarded for: Service to recruitment efforts
- Country: United States
- Presented by: United States Public Health Service
- Eligibility: Members of the United States Public Health Service Commissioned Corps
- Ribbon

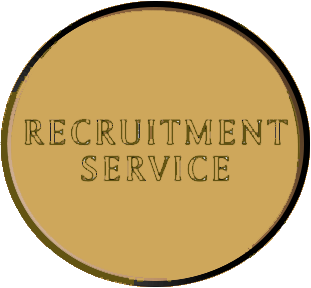
- Reverse

Precedence
- Next (higher): National Emergency Preparedness Award
- Next (lower): Global Health Initiative Service Medal

The Public Health Service Recruitment Service Award is a decoration of the United States Public Health Service presented to members of the United States Public Health Service Commissioned Corps. It recognizes contributions to recruitment efforts.

== Criteria ==
The PHS National Emergency Preparedness Award is awarded to officers who contribute to the ongoing recruitment efforts of the USPHS Commissioned Corps. An officer is eligible for the award upon the completion after 3 April 2006 of three consecutive years:

- in a position in which recruitment is a primary duty and responsibility, including policy development, the establishment of goals and strategies, and coordination of recruitment programs and initiatives; or
- of maintaining a current status in the USPHS Commissioned Corps Associate Recruiter Program.

An officer qualifies for an additional award of the Recruitment Service Award for meeting the above criteria for an additional period of three consecutive years.

== See also ==
- Awards and decorations of the Public Health Service
- Awards and decorations of the United States government
