= Susan Herbst =

American political scientist and academic administrator

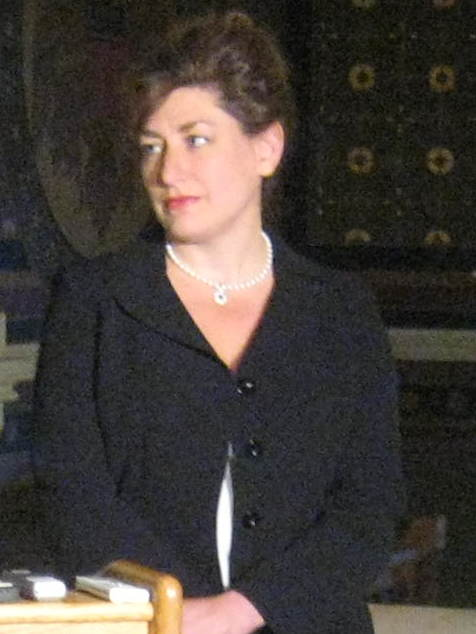

15th President of the University of Connecticut
- In office June 1, 2011 – August 2019
- Preceded by: Michael J. Hogan
- Succeeded by: Thomas C. Katsouleas

Personal details
- Born: New York City, New York, U.S.
- Spouse: Doug Hughes
- Children: 2
- Education: Duke University (BA); University of Southern California (PhD)
- Profession: Academic administrator, Political scientist

Susan Herbst is an American political scientist and academic administrator who served as the 15th president of the University of Connecticut. She was named president on December 20, 2010, and took office on June 1, 2011. She succeeded Michael J. Hogan and was the first woman to be selected as the University of Connecticut's president since the school's founding in 1881. In August 2019, Herbst was succeeded by Thomas C. Katsouleas.

== Early life and education ==
Herbst was born in New York City and raised in Peekskill, New York. Herbst received her B.A. in political science from Duke University in 1984 and her Ph.D. in communication theory and research from the University of Southern California Annenberg School for Communication in Los Angeles in 1989.

Herbst has two brothers: Jeffrey, president of the American Jewish University and Steve, vice president of broadcasting and global media strategy for NASCAR.

== Career ==
Prior to her appointment to the presidency, Herbst served as executive vice chancellor and chief academic officer at the University System of Georgia, where she led 15 university presidents and oversaw the academic missions for all 35 public universities in Georgia.

She also worked closely with the system's Board of Regents on all aspects of finance and higher education policy for the state. At the time, the system had more than 311,000 students, roughly 10,000 faculty members, and a budget of more than $6 billion a year. Herbst also held a faculty appointment as a professor of public policy at Georgia Tech.

Herbst was previously provost and executive vice president for academic affairs at University at Albany, SUNY from 2005 to 2007, and also served as acting president of the school for a year. She also served as the dean of the College of Liberal Arts at Temple University from 2003 to 2005.

Herbst joined Northwestern University as an assistant professor in 1989 and remained there until 2003. She became Professor of Political Science and Communication Studies in 1999, and eventually chaired the Department of Political Science.

Herbst has authored many scholarly journal articles and monographs, including her most recent book, A Troubled Birth: The 1930s and American Public Opinion (University of Chicago Press, November, 2021). A previous work, Rude Democracy: Civility and Incivility in American Politics (Temple University Press), was released in September 2010. Her book-length publications also include Reading Public Opinion: Political Actors View the Democratic Process (University of Chicago Press, 1998), Politics at the Margin: Historical Studies of Public Expression Outside the Mainstream (Cambridge University Press, 1994), and Numbered Voices: How Opinion Polls Have Shaped American Politics (University of Chicago Press, 1995), among others. Along with Benjamin I. Page, Lawrence R. Jacobs and James N. Druckman, she edits the University of Chicago's Chicago Studies in American Politics

On May 21, 2018, Herbst announced that she would step down from her role as president when her contract expired on July 1, 2019, but would remain on the faculty, teaching political science at the Stamford campus.

== Controversies ==
In October 2013, seven current and former students filed a federal complaint against the University of Connecticut for its allegedly inadequate response to sexual assault complaints on campus. Herbst faced criticism by student activist groups such as the IX Network for failing to investigate the sexual assault reports as required of Title IX stipulations. Though Herbst originally called the criticism of the University's response "astonishingly misguided," she began a campus-wide discourse on further actions the administration could take to improve campus culture, inviting students to personally contact her on ways the University could foster positive change.

In 2016, Herbst was criticized by state legislators after giving raises to several senior staff. The move came in the midst of funding cuts and tuition raises. Leaders of both parties from both the House and Senate opposed the raises and encouraged Herbst and the University to rescind them.

Academic offices
Preceded by Michael J. Hogan	15th President of the University of Connecticut; June 1, 2011- 2019	Succeeded by Thomas C. Katsouleas
