= Eve Slater =

American physician (born 1945)

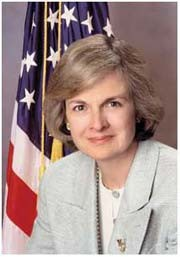

United States Assistant Secretary of Health and Human Services for Health
- In office February 8, 2002 – February 5, 2003
- President: George W. Bush
- Preceded by: Arthur J. Lawrence (acting)
- Succeeded by: Cristina Beato (acting)

Personal details
- Born: March 16, 1945 (age 81) West Orange, New Jersey, U.S.
- Children: 2
- Education: Vassar College (AB); Columbia University (MD)

Eve Elizabeth Slater (born May 16, 1945) is an American physician who served as the United States Assistant Secretary for Health and Human Services under President George W. Bush from 2002 to 2003.

== Early life and career ==
Slater was born in 1945 in West Orange, New Jersey. She received her A.B. (magna cum laude, Phi Beta Kappa) from Vassar College in 1967 and M.D. (Alpha Omega Alpha) from the Columbia University College of Physicians and Surgeons in 1971. She completed residency in internal medicine and fellowship in cardiology at the Massachusetts General Hospital in Boston. In 1976, she was appointed the Chief Resident in Medicine at MGH, the first woman to appointed to this position. She also led the Hypertension Unit while serving as Assistant Professor of Medicine at Harvard Medical School.

She served as Assistant Secretary for Health in the Department of Health and Human Services from 2002 to 2003. She was the first woman to hold this Senate-confirmed position, with special contributions in women’s health, biosecurity, and electronic health record standards.

Slater is currently Professor of Clinical Medicine at Columbia University College of Physicians and Surgeons (P&S), where she has taught for over 35 years. She is board certified in internal medicine and cardiology and a fellow of the American College of Cardiology.

She has also served as Senior Vice President, Worldwide Policy at Pfizer. She spent over 19 years with Merck & Co. as Senior Vice President of Clinical and Regulatory Development, and SVP of External Policy. Many of Merck’s drugs, including statins, vaccines, and HIV/AIDS medicines received worldwide regulatory approval during her tenure. She was also responsible for the Merck Manuals and OTC programs with Johnson & Johnson. She was a member of the U.S. Keystone National Policy Dialogue on HIV, and the NIH Office of AIDS Research Advisory Council.

== Honors and awards ==
She has received the Virginia Kneeland Frantz Distinguished Women in Medicine Award from P&S, the Chairman's Award from Merck, and was selected to the National Library of Medicine's "Changing the Face of Medicine: Celebrating America’s Women Physicians." She currently serves or has served on the Boards of several non-profit and biotech organizations, including Stealth BioTherapeutics, Vassar College, Network for Excellence in Health Innovation, ACRES (Alliance for Clinical Research Excellence and Safety), the Rockefeller University Council, the New England Conservatory of Music President’s Advisory Council, Vertex Pharmaceuticals, Theravance, AnorMed, Idera Pharmaceuticals, Phase Forward and VaxGen.

== Personal life ==
In 1981, Slater married Adam Sanders Solomon (1952–2008), a vice president for corporate finance at Salomon Brothers and the son of Anthony M. Solomon, president of the Federal Reserve Bank of New York. They had two sons, Peter and James.

As an amateur flutist, she appeared as a soloist with Arthur Fiedler and the Boston Pops.

Political offices
Preceded by Arthur J. Lawrence; Acting	United States Assistant Secretary of Health and Human Services for Health; 2002–2003	Succeeded by Cristina Beato; Acting
