= Dorothy Fink =

American endocrinologist

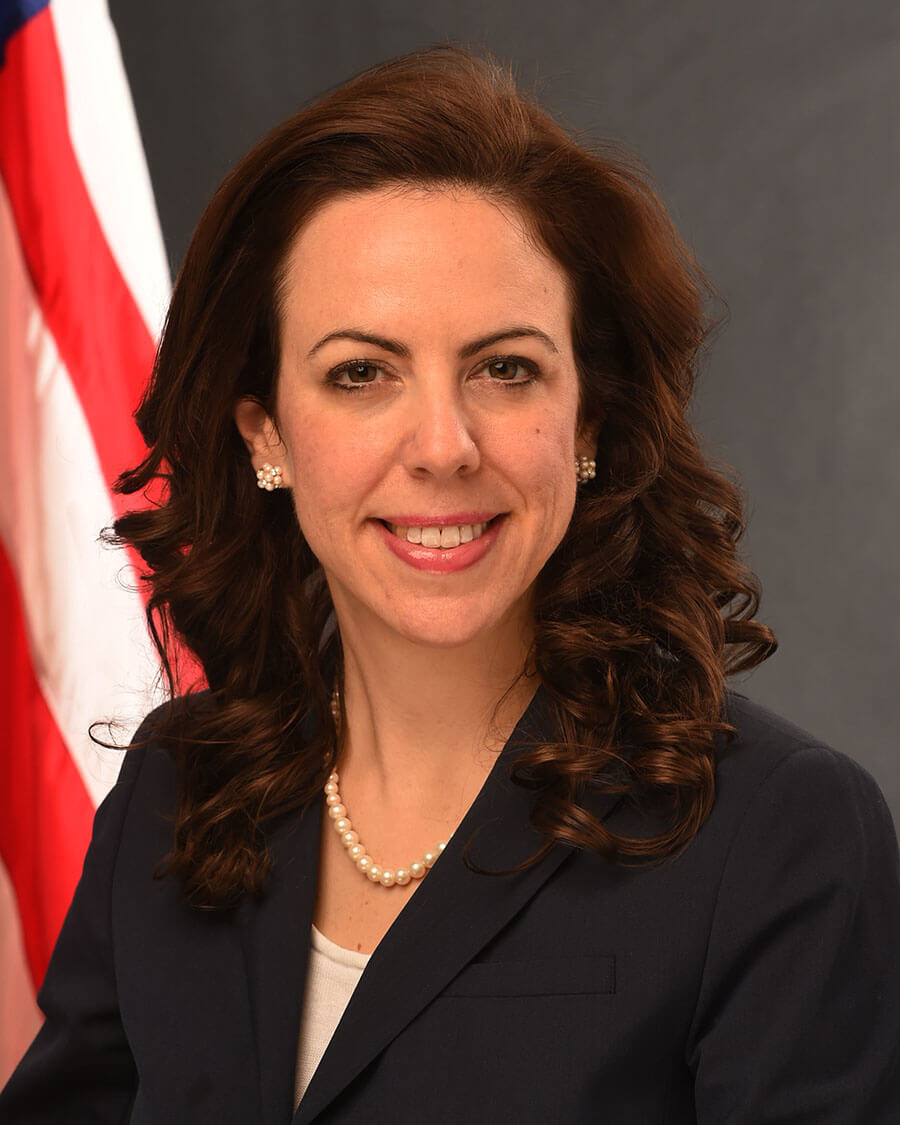
- Official portrait, 2025

Principal Deputy Assistant Secretary for Health
- Incumbent
- Assumed office November 11, 2025
- President: Donald Trump
- Secretary: Robert F. Kennedy Jr.

Assistant Secretary for Health
- Acting; May 26, 2025 – November 10, 2025
- President: Donald Trump
- Secretary: Robert F. Kennedy Jr.
- Preceded by: Leith J. States (acting); Rachel Levine
- Succeeded by: Brian Christine

United States Secretary of Health and Human Services
- Acting; January 20, 2025 – February 13, 2025
- President: Donald Trump
- Preceded by: Xavier Becerra
- Succeeded by: Robert F. Kennedy Jr.

Personal details
- Spouse: Michael Pacold
- Education: Georgetown University (BS, MD)

Dorothy Alanna Fink is an American endocrinologist and government official who serves as the principal deputy assistant secretary for health since November 2025. She previously served as the acting assistant secretary for health from May 2025 to November 2025. She previously served as the acting United States secretary of health and human services from January to February 2025. She is also the director of the Office on Women's Health in the Department of Health and Human Services.

== Early life and education ==
Fink is the daughter of Robert and Karen Fink of Johnstown, Pennsylvania, where she graduated from Westmont Hilltop High School in 1999. She attended Georgetown University where she focused on health studies. She received several awards as a student at Georgetown, including one for outstanding undergraduate research in chemistry, and she was also a USA Today Academic All-American. Fink once featured as a contestant on the Jan 17, 2007 episode of the long-running American television game show The Price Is Right.

Fink received her medical degree from Georgetown University School of Medicine. She completed her combined internal medicine and pediatrics residency at the University of Pittsburgh Medical Center. She then completed a National Institutes of Health post-doctoral fellowship in endocrinology and metabolism at the Columbia University College of Physicians and Surgeons in New York. During her fellowship, Fink was selected as a Women's Health Scholar and worked at the Center for Menopause, Hormonal Disorders and Women's Health. She has authored or co-authored 11 peer-reviewed articles on topics that include thromboembolic disease, diabetes, and osteoporosis. Fink's h-index, a measure of her scholarly productivity and scientific impact, is reported to be 11.

Fink is board certified in endocrinology, internal medicine, and pediatrics, and is recognized as a physician leader on topics such as diabetes, nutrition, and bone health. Previously, her clinical practice focused on women from adolescence through menopause and beyond. She is a nationally certified menopause practitioner and an expert on estrogen. She has presented at several national meetings and has practiced at the Hospital for Special Surgery and the NewYork-Presbyterian Hospital, Cornell University.

== Government official ==
=== First Trump administration ===
In 2018, Fink was appointed by President Donald Trump as the deputy assistant secretary for women's health. In this role, Fink addressed the United Nations as part of the UN Human Rights Council Universal Periodic Review, a process that reviews the human rights records of member states, on the importance of reducing health disparities in minority populations. She also became the director of the Office on Women's Health in the Department of Health and Human Services, lecturing on the importance of enhancing immunization culture, improving vaccine uptake, and combating vaccine misinformation.

=== Second Trump administration ===
==== Acting Secretary of the Department of Health and Human Services ====
On January 20, 2025, Fink was named by President Trump as the acting United States Secretary of Health and Human Services, as his nominee for the position, Robert F. Kennedy Jr., had not yet been approved by the Senate. She immediately issued a January 21 memo titled "Immediate Pause on Issuing Documents and Publication Communications" forbidding U.S. health agency personnel from sending any document intended for publication to the Office of the Federal Register until it has been reviewed and approved by a presidential appointee, publicly issuing any document or communication until it has been approved by a presidential appointee, and participating in public speaking engagements until the event and material have been reviewed and approved by a presidential appointee through February 1, 2025. The memo also required that health agency personnel coordinate with presidential appointees prior to issuing official correspondence to public officials, including that containing interpretations or statements of department regulations or policy. The effect of the action was to bring the work of HHS agencies (most importantly the CDC, NIH, and FDA) to a virtual halt. Despite the February 1, 2025 expiration of the directives included in Fink's January 21 memo, the blocking of submissions to the Federal Register persists as of March 2, 2025, essentially halting all federal biomedical and public health research funding agencies, including the National Institutes of Health (NIH).

On February 7, 2025, under the direction of Fink as acting HHS Secretary, the National Institutes of Health issued new guidance on NIH grants setting new, reduced, rates of support for the indirect costs of institutions performing NIH-sponsored research. Critics of the NIH policy shift included leading scientific and medical associations, with the sudden loss of funding described as "devastating", "apocalyptic", "disastrous" and "catastrophic". In response to the cuts, lawsuits were filed by attorneys general of twenty-two states, the Association of American Medical Colleges, the Association of American Universities, and other organizations representing leading biomedical research institutions, seeking an injunction to prevent the cuts from taking effect.

On February 10, 2025, U.S. District Judge Angel Kelley from the District of Massachusetts granted the plaintiff's motion for a temporary restraining order blocking Fink's policy from taking effect as planned. Fink, a named co-defendant in multiple lawsuits, filed a brief in opposition to the restraining order defending the drastic cuts in NIH funding. After a February 21 hearing, Judge Kelley extended the temporary restraining order pending a final ruling, but major scientific research institutions have already begun to shutter laboratories, pause or rescind graduate student admissions, and freeze hiring and spending in anticipation of what they view to be a potentially catastrophic policy taking effect, as well as other cuts in federal funding related to science and public health made by Executive orders issued by President Donald Trump or at the discretion of the Department of Government Efficiency. On March 5, 2025, Judge Kelley ruled in favor of the plaintiffs, argued that NIH violated federal law and did not "contemplate the risk to human life as research and clinical trials are suspended in response" or "the life, careers, and advancement that will be lost as these budgets are indiscriminately slashed..."

On February 18, 2025, it was reported that Fink and colleagues at HHS employed a new tactic to circumvent court orders enjoining the Trump administration's executive actions freezing Federal funding and cutting Congressionally allocated NIH-sponsored research. A leaked internal email sent to NIH personnel forbids NIH staff from submitting meeting notices to the Federal Register, the official journal of the United States Federal Government. Meetings of study sections and advisory councils staffed by leading scientific expertise, which are responsible for reviewing NIH funding proposals and providing guidance to NIH on funding priorities, are required by law to post meeting plans in the Federal Register 15 days in advance of their scheduled date. Without being able to post meeting schedules in the Federal Register, new NIH grants cannot be reviewed or awarded. As of March 5, 2025, no announcements of advisory council meetings have been posted, an action effectively halting the NIH grant award process.

Political offices
Preceded by Xavier Becerra	United States Secretary of Health and Human Services; Acting; 2025	Succeeded by Robert F. Kennedy Jr.
Government offices
Preceded by Leith J. States (Acting)	Assistant Secretary for Health; Acting; 2025	Succeeded by Brian Christine
