= Office on Women's Health =

Part of the U.S. Department of Health and Human Services

Agency overview
- Formed: 1991; 35 years ago
- Agency executive: Dorothy Fink, Director
- Parent department: United States Department of Health and Human Services (Office of the Assistant Secretary for Health)
- Website: www.womenshealth.gov

The Office on Women's Health (OWH) is part of the U.S. Department of Health and Human Services (DHHS) and functions to improve the health and well-being of U.S. women and girls. The main headquarters, from which the OWH operate, is located in Washington, DC with ten other regional women's health coordinators positioned across the country to implement local health initiatives.

== Background ==
The OWH was introduced in 1991 within the DHHS and is directed by the Deputy Assistant Secretary for [Women's] Health (DASWH.) The OWH typically work alongside federal government agencies; associations of health care professionals; tribal organizations; non-profit charities; consumer groups and state, county and local governments. Through funding and contracts with these organisations, the OWH is able to administer various strategies and programmes to improve women's health in America and increase awareness. The Affordable Care Act codified the establishment of an Office on Women’s Health within the Office of the Secretary of HHS, as well as Offices of Women’s Health within four of its agencies: the Agency for Healthcare Research and Quality (AHRQ), the Centers for Disease Control and Prevention (CDC), the Food and Drug Administration (FDA), and the Health Resources and Services Administration (HRSA).

== Awards and recognition ==
A number of campaigns employed by the OWH have gained recognition for their work:

- 'Best Bones Forever!', a campaign encouraging girls to eat more foods with calcium and vitamin D, received a Public Relations Society of America Silver Anvil Award for Best Government Public Service Campaign.
- 'National Women’s Health Week', a week aimed at increasing awareness about women's health, received a Blue Pencil & Gold Screen Award of Excellence from the National Association of Government Communicators.
- The OWH website, womenshealth.gov, won the Government Customer Support Excellence Award in the Customer Focus Excellence category.
- Womenshealth.gov and girlshealth.gov were ranked as top performers in the American Customer Satisfaction Index (ACSI) Survey.

== Regional Coordinators ==
The role of local coordinators is to comply with national strategy established by the U.S. Department of Health and Human Services and to represent the Deputy Assistant Secretary for Health by initiating campaigns in their communities. Other responsibilities include identifying regional needs in women's health and implementing activities in health care service delivery, research, and education. The regions are split up in the following way:

- Region I – Connecticut, Maine, Massachusetts, New Hampshire, Rhode Island, and Vermont
- Region II – New Jersey, New York, Commonwealth of Puerto Rico, and U.S. Virgin Islands (St. Thomas, St. Croix, and St. John)
- Region III – Delaware, District of Columbia, Maryland, Pennsylvania, Virginia, and West Virginia
- Region IV – Alabama, Florida, Georgia, Kentucky, Mississippi, North Carolina, South Carolina, and Tennessee
- Region V – Illinois, Indiana, Michigan, Minnesota, Ohio, and Wisconsin
- Region VI – Arkansas, Louisiana, New Mexico, Oklahoma, and Texas
- Region VII – Iowa, Kansas, Missouri, and Nebraska
- Region VIII – Colorado, Montana, North Dakota, South Dakota, Utah, and Wyoming
- Region IX – Arizona, California, Hawaii, Nevada, and the United States Pacific Island Jurisdictions: American Samoa, Commonwealth of the Northern Mariana Islands, Federated States of Micronesia, Guam, Republic of the Marshall Islands, and Republic of Palau
- Region X – Alaska, Idaho, Oregon, and Washington
