= Public Health Service Global Health Initiative Service Medal =

Decoration of the U.S. Public Health Service

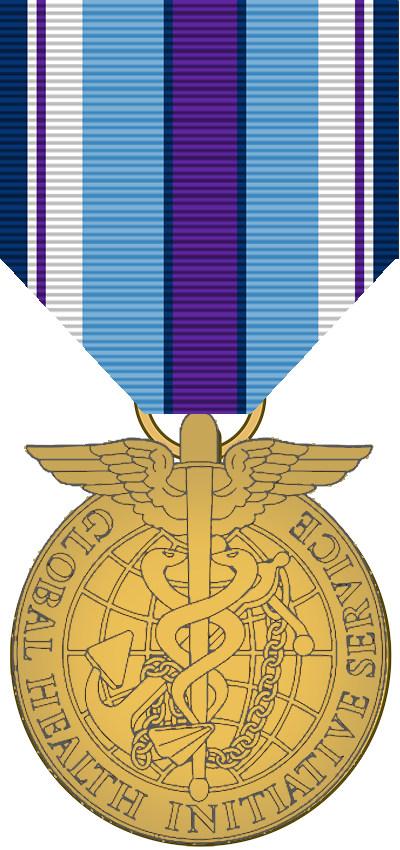
- Type: Service award
- Awarded for: Support of Global Health Initiatives
- Country: United States
- Presented by: United States Public Health Service
- Eligibility: Members of the United States Public Health Service Commissioned Corps
- Ribbon

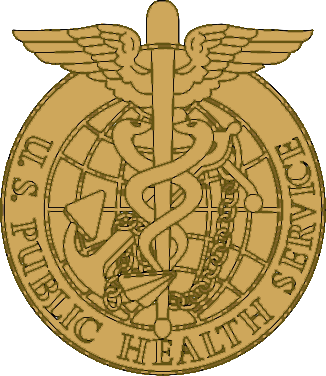
- Reverse

Precedence
- Next (higher): Recruitment Service Award
- Next (lower): Bicentennial Unit Commendation Award

The Public Health Service Global Health Initiative Service Medal, also written Global Health Initiatives Service Medal, is a decoration of the United States Public Health Service presented to members of the United States Public Health Service Commissioned Corps. It recognizes service in support of Global Health Initiatives.

== Criteria ==
The PHS Global Health Initiative Service Medal is awarded to officers who support Global Health Initiatives both within ("CONUS") and outside ("OCONUS") the contiguous United States. The Surgeon General of the United States determines which Global Health Initiatives and missions qualify for the award.

To be eligible for the award, an officer must support a qualifying Global Health Initiative assignment for at least 30 consecutive days or 60 non-consecutive days while on a temporary or permanent assignment after 26 January 2005. Any period of 30 or more consecutive days is not included in the computation of the 60 non-consecutive days. "Support" is defined as deploying or providing direct administrative, logistical, financial, or operational support.

An officer may receive only one award of the Global Health Initiative Service Medal for participation in the same Global Health Initiative or mission. An officer eligible for the Public Health Service Global Health Campaign Medal via his or her support to a Global Health Initiative is not eligible for the Global Health Initiative Service Medal for the same support effort.

== See also ==
- Awards and decorations of the Public Health Service
- Awards and decorations of the United States government
