= Joxel García =

Puerto Rican physician and four-star admiral

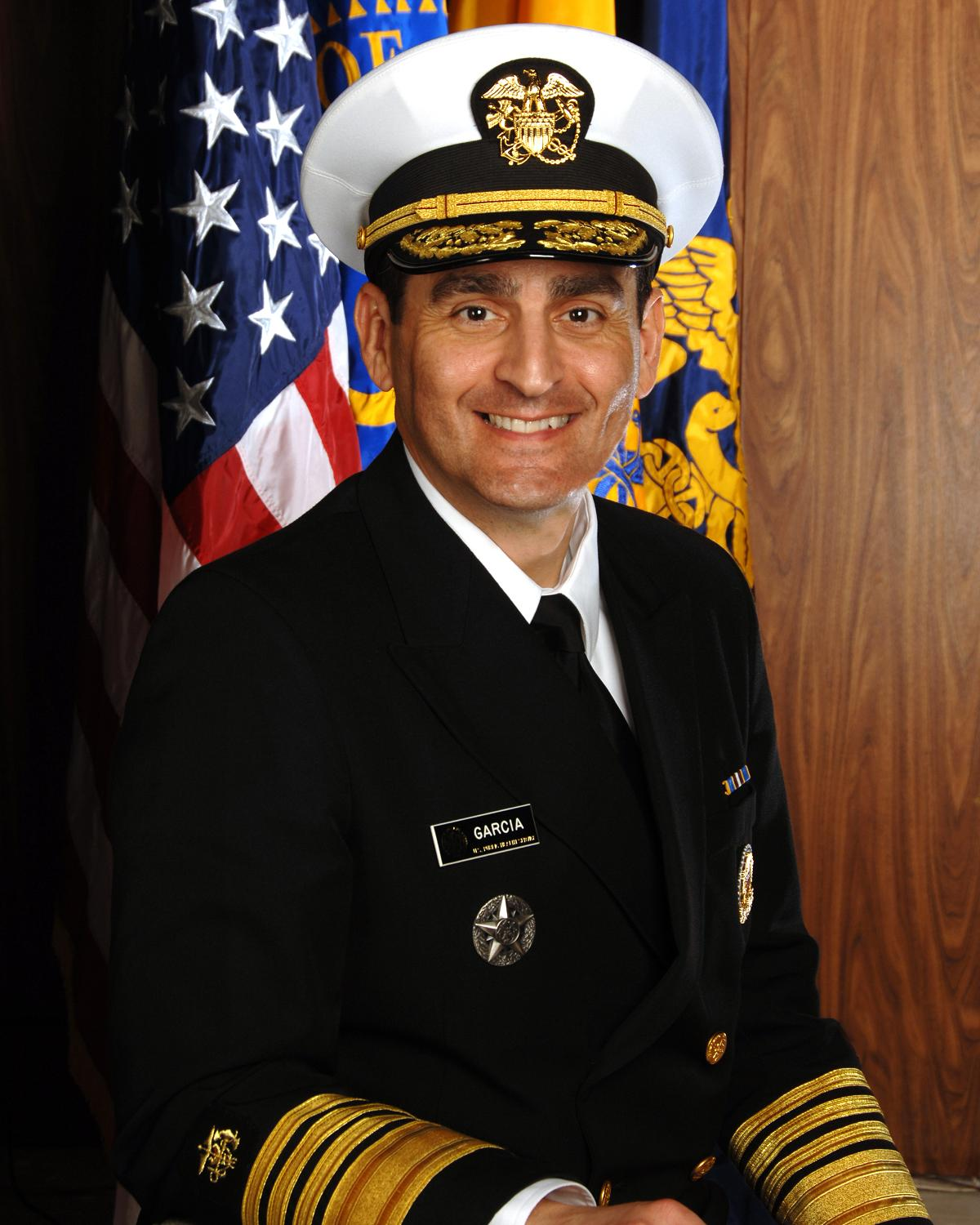
- Official portrait, 2008

Assistant Secretary for Health
- In office March 28, 2008 – January 20, 2009
- President: George W. Bush
- Preceded by: John O. Agwunobi
- Succeeded by: Howard Koh

Personal details
- Born: Arecibo, Puerto Rico
- Education: University of Puerto Rico at Mayagüez (BSc); Ponce Health Sciences University (MD); University of Hartford (MBA)

Military service
- Allegiance: United States
- Branch/service: U.S. Public Health Service
- Years of service: 1999-2003
- Rank: Admiral
- Commands: United States Public Health Service
- Awards: Department of Defense Medal for Distinguished Public Service

Joxel García is a Puerto Rican physician and a former four-star admiral in the U.S. Public Health Service Commissioned Corps. He served as the fourteenth Assistant Secretary for Health (ASH), U.S. Department of Health and Human Services from March 13, 2008, to January 20, 2009. He served as the Director of Health in the District of Columbia. He served as the Executive Director of the MD Anderson Cancer Control and Prevention Platform and Member of the Leadership Team of the MD Anderson Moon Shots program until May 2017 before joining American Express as Vice President and Chief Medical Officer.

== Early years and medical preparation ==
Dr. García was born in Arecibo, Puerto Rico, and raised in Hatillo, Puerto Rico. His father was a prominent dairy farmer and his mother a teacher. He was the oldest boy of five children. He completed his pre-medical studies at the University of Puerto Rico at Mayagüez. He graduated from the Ponce School of Medicine in 1988. He received a Master of Business Administration degree from the University of Hartford. He did his residency in obstetrics and gynecology at Mount Sinai Hospital in Hartford, Connecticut, after being trained as an obstetrician and gynecologist at the Ponce School of Medicine.

== Private practice ==
When he completed his residency, García opened his private practice at Saint Francis Hospital & Medical Center in Hartford, Connecticut. Since then, García served in several appointed positions at Mt. Sinai, St. Francis, and the University of Connecticut Health Center. After obtaining his M.D. degree, García served as the Assistant Director of the Obstetrics and Gynecology Department at the Saint Francis Hospital & Medical Center in Hartford.

== Connecticut's Commissioner of Public Health ==
From 1999 to 2003, García was Commissioner of Public Health for the state of Connecticut. During that time, he instituted a bioterrorism preparedness program, launched the national smallpox preparation and vaccination plans, and led Connecticut's response to the anthrax attack as a model for the United States. He also created health initiatives for disease prevention, and managed improvements in health literacy and economic conditions.

== Global public health exposure ==
From 2003 to 2006, García served as Deputy Director of the Pan American Health Organization (PAHO)/Regional Office Western Hemisphere for the World Health Organization. As Deputy Director, García was responsible for setting the general direction and strategy of the organization alongside the director and for providing leadership and advice on all policy decisions. He was also responsible for maintaining effective relations between the organization and the governments of the United States, Canada and Puerto Rico. When appointed to the PAHO position, Secretary of Health Thomas G. Thompson said, "As a leader in his home state of Connecticut and a proud son of Puerto Rico, Dr. Garcia embodies the multilingual, multiethnic face of our hemisphere."

== Corporate experience ==
Prior to becoming Assistant Secretary of Health, García served as the Senior Vice President and Senior Medical Advisor at MAXIMUS Federal Services Inc. There, García oversaw the work of the MAXIMUS' Center for Global Health and was the principal architect of the strategic partnership plan for the Western Hemisphere. García led several programs at MAXIMUS including emergency preparedness and disaster relief. Dr. Garcia is a founding member of Aegis Health Analytics and serves as a member of the Board of Directors.

Dr. Garcia currently serves as the Founder and CEO, Chairman of the Board of Ambitna involved in accelerating therapies and cures.

Dr. Garcia is a partner with NL Capital Ventures involved in management and acquisitions of home health care agencies, medical staffing, & assisted living facilities.

== U.S. Assistant Secretary for Health ==
García was nominated for appointment by President George W. Bush for the position of Assistant Secretary for Health with the rank of admiral in the Public Health Service Commissioned Corps in late 2007. He was confirmed by the U.S. Senate on March 14, 2008, becoming the first Puerto Rican to serve as Assistant Secretary for Health.

As the Assistant Secretary for Health, García was the primary advisor to the Secretary of Health and Human Services on matters involving the nation's public health system and health science. He also oversaw the U.S. Public Health Service and its Commissioned Corps for the Secretary of Health. In his position, García's responsibilities included disease prevention, health promotion, public health preparedness, women's and minority health, reduction of health disparities, fight against HIV/AIDS, pandemic influenza planning, and vaccine preventable diseases. García's experience in public health encompassed health care delivery, bioterrorism preparedness, health policy, and international health affairs.

== President and Dean of Ponce School of Medicine ==
On April 1, 2009, García was named President and Dean of the Ponce Health Sciences University. On his inaugural speech he said, "All the things I have mentioned here are not dreams but things that I am already working on, things that are happening, and will continue to evolve". He feels that Puerto Rico could be a regional medical training center.

== Washington, D.C. Department of Health Director and Chief Medical Officer ==
On August 1, 2012, Garcia was named Washington, D.C. Department of Health Director and Chief Medical Officer. During his tenure, he led the District's efforts to respond to the Ebola outbreak in coordination with the CDC for the region. Under the Executive Office of the Mayor, Garcia led the launch of a Clinton Global Initiative commitment to action in collaboration with Aegis Health Security and 40 commitment members to prevent preventable infant deaths and health disparities.

== University of Texas MD Anderson Cancer Center Executive Director of the Cancer Control and Prevention Platform ==
On August 31, 2015, Garcia was named Executive Director of the University of Texas MD Anderson Cancer Center Cancer Control and Prevention Platform. Dr. Garcia worked with the University of Texas MD Anderson leadership to create a global platform for research, prevention and treatment to establish centers of excellence.

== New York City Department of Health and Mental Hygiene Deputy Commissioner and Chief Program Officer ==
On June 21, 2024 Dr. Joxel Garcia has been appointed by Health Commissioner Dr. Ashwin Vasan as the Department of Health and Mental Hygiene’s First Deputy Commissioner and Chief Program Officer. His duties include overseeing the Divisions of Disease Control, Environmental Health, Family and Child Health, and Mental Hygiene.

== Extracurricular ==
Dr. García has served on a number of national boards, including the Prevent Cancer Foundation, National Advisory Committee on Violence against Women, National Dialogue on Cancer, the United States Preventive Services Task Force, the Campaign for Tobacco Free Kids, Trinity Health Of New England and as the president-elect of the Association of State and Territorial Health Officials.

Author of the Guimoland books: the Adventures of Guimo Audi

Dr. García is said to have seen his role as Assistant Secretary for Health as an opportunity to enhance the Secretary's efforts to further the mission of the United States Department of Health and Human Services and the health of the nation by building, strengthening and leveraging relationships across the public health community and the US Public Health Service while also improving healthcare for all Americans.

== Awards and Badges ==
- Department of Defense Medal for Distinguished Public Service
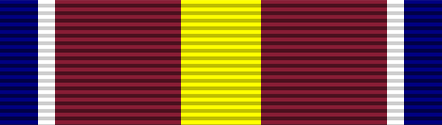
- Public Health Service Distinguished Service Medal
- Public Health Service Regular Corps Ribbon
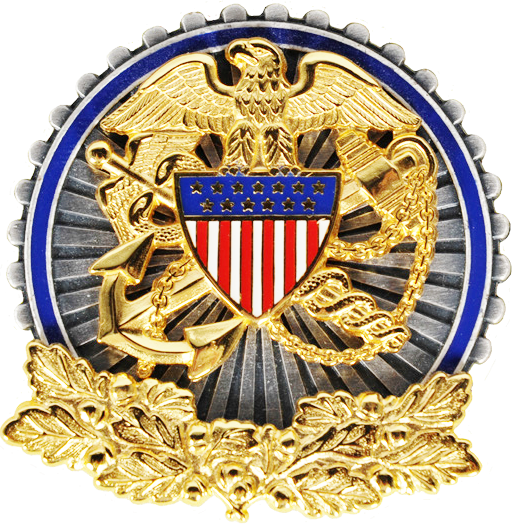
- Badge of the Office of the Secretary of Health and Human Services
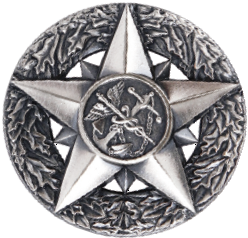
- Officer-in-Charge Badge

== Personal ==
García resides in Washington, D.C. and formerly resided in New York City, Houston, TX and Avon, Connecticut. He has three children.

== See also ==
- List of Puerto Ricans – Military
- University of Puerto Rico at Mayagüez people

Political offices
Preceded by John O. Agwunobi	Assistant Secretary for Health; 2008–2009	Succeeded by Steven Galson; Acting
