= Public Health Service Isolated/Hardship Award =

Decoration of the US Public Health Service

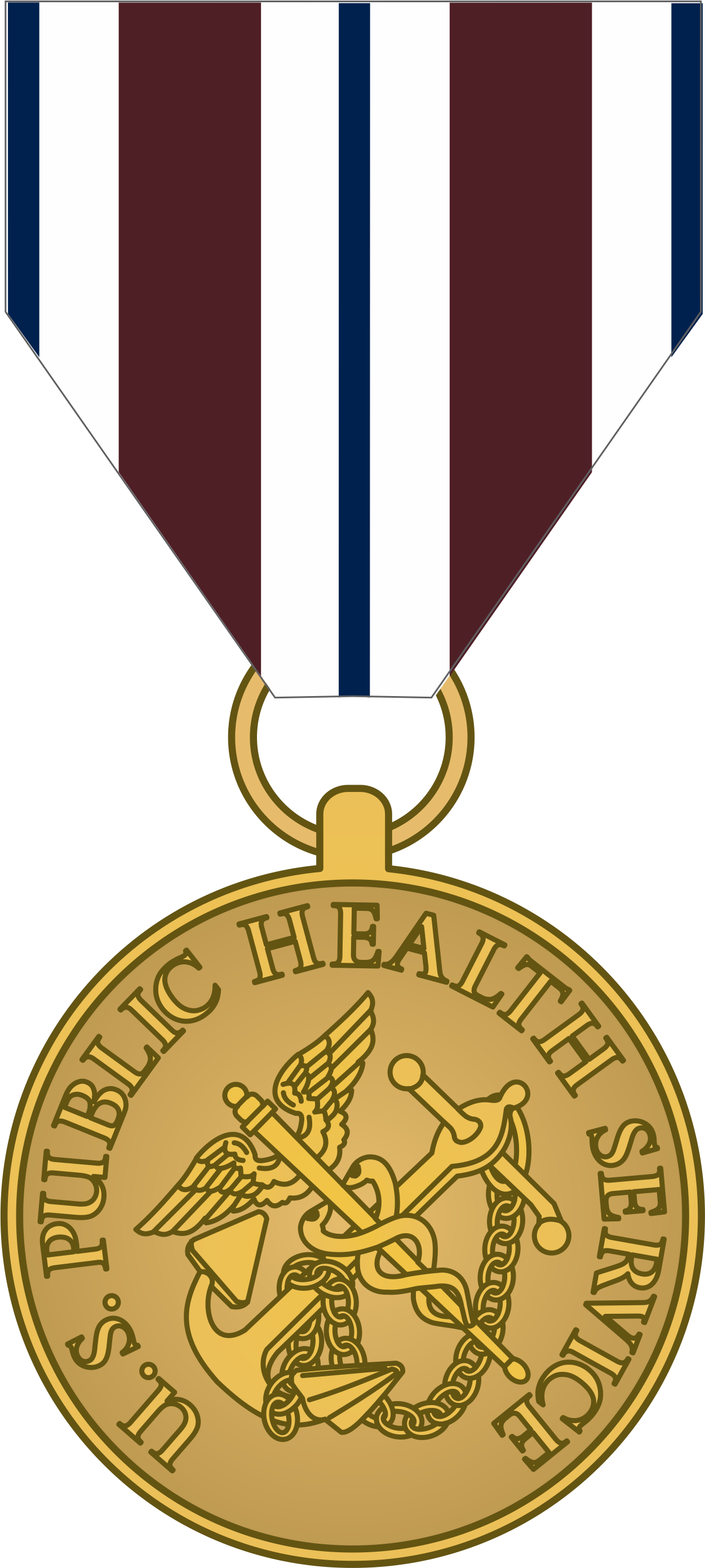
- Type: Service award
- Awarded for: Service in an isolated area or an area which constitutes hardship duty
- Country: United States
- Presented by: United States Public Health Service
- Eligibility: Members of the United States Public Health Service Commissioned Corps
- Ribbon

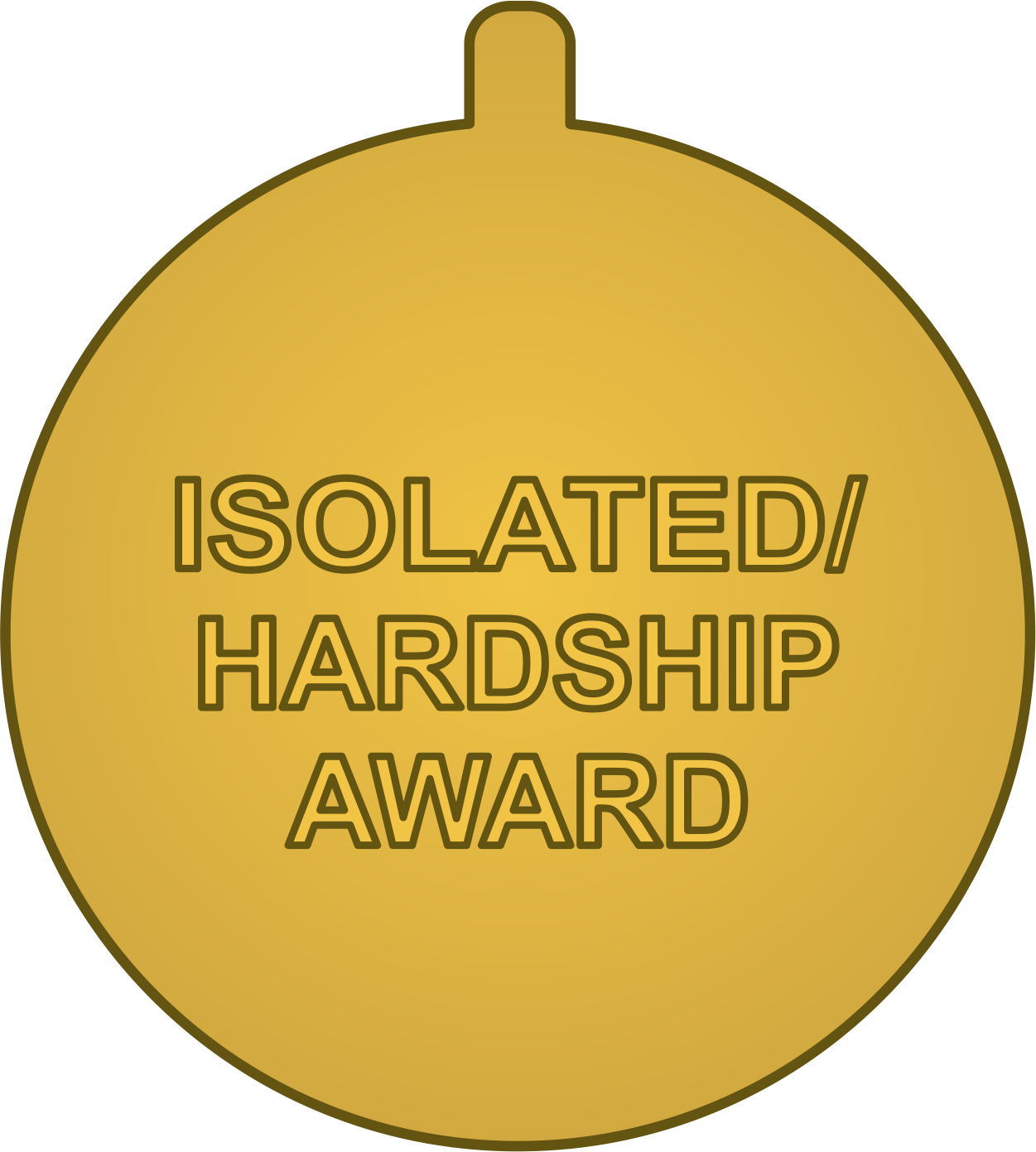
- Reverse

Precedence
- Next (higher): Special Assignment Award
- Next (lower): Crisis Response Service Award

The Public Health Service Isolated/Hardship Award is a decoration of the United States Public Health Service presented to members of the United States Public Health Service Commissioned Corps. It recognizes service in remote areas or locations in which serving on a duty station imposed hardships on the awardee. It often is written as "Isolated Hardship Award," although both isolation and hardship are not necessarily required to qualify for it.

== Criteria ==
The PHS Isolated/Hardship Award is awarded to officers who have served a minimum of 180 consecutive days in an area designated as isolated, remote, insular, or constituting a hardship duty assignment. The USPHS Commissioned Corps maintains a list of duty stations in the United States and its territories the Commissioned Corps specifically identifies as qualifying for the award. An officer qualifies for the award each time he or she serves at one of these designated sites as his or her permanent duty station for at least 180 consecutive days; his or her entire tour of duty must take place at the same site to qualify. The officer must serve at a separate permanent duty station – one not designated as isolated or hardship duty – for at least 180 days before he or she can begin a tour of duty at a site that qualifies him or her for another Isolated/Hardship Award.

An officer also qualifies for the award if he or she receives hardship duty pay for 180 consecutive days while serving outside the contiguous United States ("OCONUS"), or if he or she is assigned to a ship absent from its home port for at least 180 consecutive days, which the USPHS Commissioned Corps classifies as "Unusually Arduous Sea Duty."

An officer may also qualify for the award on a case-by-case basis if the Surgeon General of the United States, or someone to whom he or she delegates the authority, determines that the officer has performed an assignment lasting at least 180 consecutive days which constitutes a hardship. An unaccompanied tour – i.e., one in which the officer's family does not accompany the officer – or one not otherwise qualifying the officer for the award but for which the officer received hardship duty pay are examples of the types of tours that may qualify for the award.

== See also ==
- Awards and decorations of the Public Health Service
- Awards and decorations of the United States government
