= Thomas C. Katsouleas =

American academic administrator

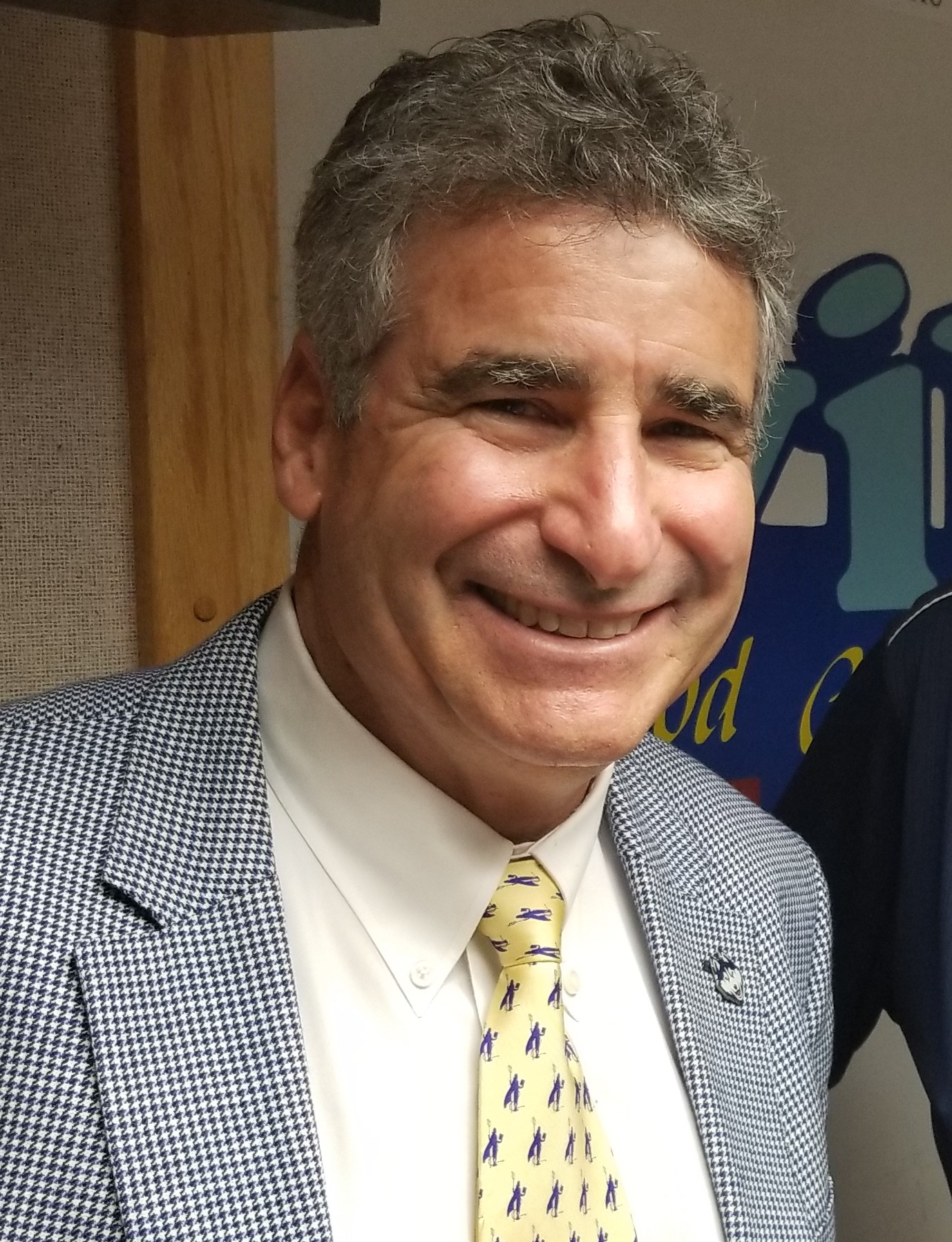

16th President of the University of Connecticut
- In office August 1, 2019 – June 30, 2021
- Preceded by: Susan Herbst
- Succeeded by: Andrew Agwunobi

Personal details
- Education: University of California, Los Angeles (B.A., Ph.D.)

Thomas Christos Katsouleas (known as "TomKat" by students) is an American physicist, engineer, and academic administrator. In February 2019, he was named the 16th president of the University of Connecticut and officially began his term in August. He resigned the presidency in 2021 and returned to the faculty.

== Education ==
Katsouleas began his undergraduate education at Santa Monica Community College and received his bachelor's degree from University of California, Los Angeles in 1979, earning his Ph.D. in physics from UCLA in 1984.

== Career ==
After graduating from UCLA, Katsouleas taught there for seven years before joining the faculty of the University of Southern California in 1991 as an associate professor of physics. In 1997, he was named a full professor. Katsouleas was vice provost for information services at USC and also was an associate dean of the USC Viterbi School of Engineering. Katsouleas subsequently served as the dean of the Duke University Pratt School of Engineering and, beginning in 2015, as provost and executive vice president of the University of Virginia.

On August 1, 2019, Katsouleas became the president of the University of Connecticut; the Greek Orthodox Archbishop Elpidophoros attended the inauguration ceremony. At his inauguration, Katsouleas announced the Connecticut Commitment initiative to cover the cost of tuition for qualified undergraduate and transfer students with household incomes below $50,000. Amid the financial crisis caused by the COVID-19 pandemic, the initiative was paused indefinitely in October 2020. Katsouleas also vowed to double research spending at UConn to $500 million by 2030.

Katsouleas announced key initiatives without consulting the UConn Board of Trustees. A rocky relationship with the trustees ensued. Katsouleas was also frustrated at UConn's high fringe rates and unfunded pension liabilities, which he stated made the university less competitive at winning research grants. Katsouleas resigned as UConn president effective June 30, 2021. He became a tenured professor in UConn's Department of Electrical and Computer Engineering, earning over $330,000 per year. Trustees appointed UConn Health CEO Andrew Agwunobi as interim president.

Katsouleas is an inventor and was awarded the Plasma Science Achievement Award by the Institute of Electrical Engineers in 2001. He is the author or co-author of more than 200 publications. He was elected in 1996 a fellow of the American Physical Society for "original contributions to advanced particle acceleration concepts including the invention of the Surfatron accelerator, and his detailed studies of beam loading and emittance growth in plasma accelerators."

He founded the NAE Grand Challenges Summit in Durham in 2009. In 2010, Katsouleas started Duke's Katsouleas NAE Grand Challenge Scholars Program, which challenges students to use their knowledge to work on challenges posed by the National Academy of Engineering.

Academic offices
| Preceded by Susan Herbst | 16th President of the University of Connecticut; 2019–2021 | Succeeded by Andrew Agwunobi |
