= Radenka Maric =

American scientist and academic administrator

Radenka Marić
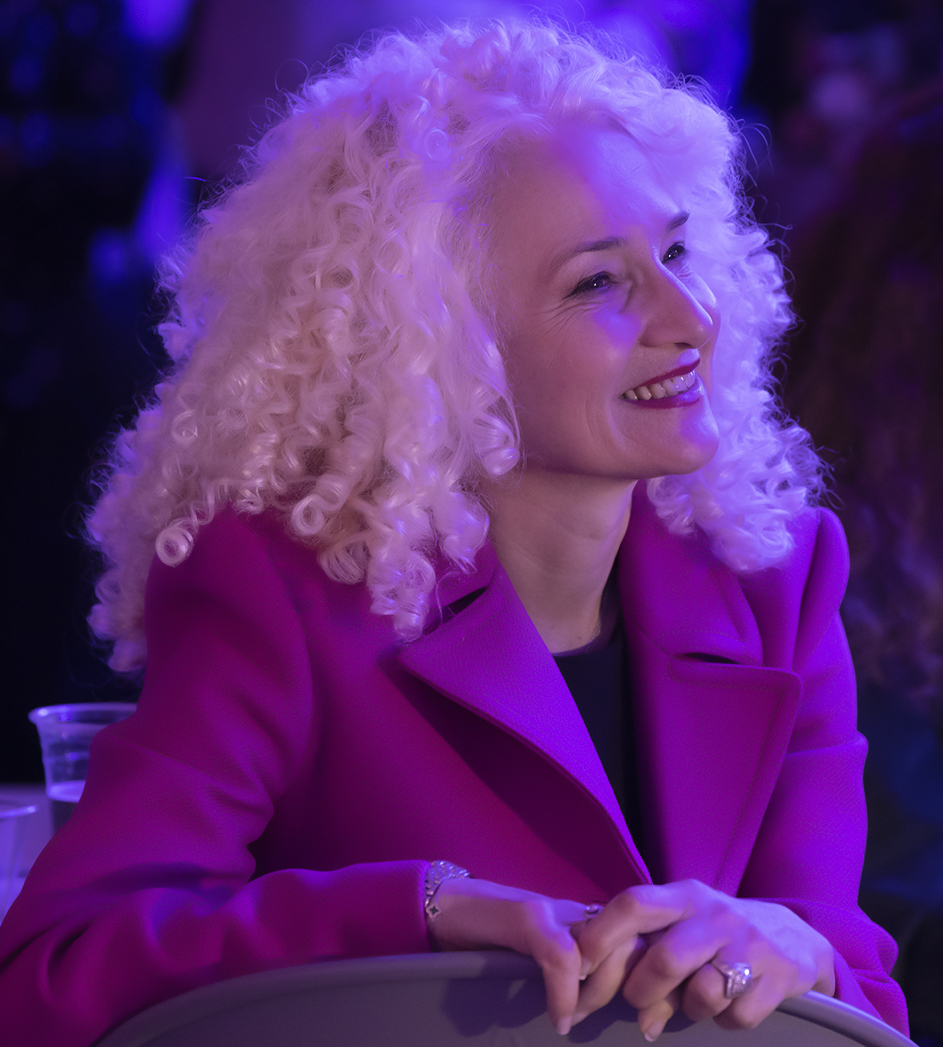
- Marić in 2023

17th President of the University of Connecticut
- Incumbent
- Assumed office February 1, 2022
- Preceded by: Andrew Agwunobi

Personal details
- Born: 1966 or 1967 (age 58–59) Derventa, SR Bosnia and Herzegovina, SFR Yugoslavia (now Bosnia and Herzegovina)
- Education: University of Belgrade (BS); Kyoto University (MS, PhD)

Radenka Marić (née Đekić; born 1966 or 1967) is a Bosnian-American engineer and academic who became the 17th president of the University of Connecticut (UConn) on September 28, 2022. She was the first internal candidate to be named president since Harry J. Hartley in 1990 and is the institution’s second female president. She had been interim president of the University of Connecticut since February 1, 2022, and previously was UConn's vice president for research and innovation.

== Early life and education ==
Born and raised in Derventa, Bosnia and Herzegovina, then part of Yugoslavia, Marić earned her B.S. from the University of Belgrade in Serbia and her M.S. and Ph.D. in materials science and energy from Kyoto University in Japan. Marić is Jewish.

She worked as a researcher for the Serbian Academy of Science and Art from November 1989 to October 1991.

== Academic career ==
After spending 12 years in Japan, she moved to the United States in 2001 to work at a clean-energy startup in Atlanta. Three years later, she began leading the Institute for Fuel Cell Innovation at the National Research Council Canada. She joined UConn in 2010 as a professor of chemical and biomolecular engineering. In 2016, she received a Fulbright U.S. Scholar Award to accept a visiting chair professor appointment at the Polytechnic University of Milan in Italy. Her Fulbright award supported research into High Temperature Proton Exchange Membrane Fuel Cells (PEMFC), a clean energy technology.

A Board of Trustees Distinguished Professor, Marić holds the faculty appointment of Connecticut Clean Energy Fund Professor of Sustainable Energy in UConn's Department of Chemical and Biomolecular Engineering and Department of Materials Science and Engineering. Over the course of her career, she has received more than $40 million in research funding, published more than 300 articles in refereed journals and conference proceedings, and registered six patents.

Marić became vice president for Research, Innovation, and Entrepreneurship in July 2017. In this role, she oversaw the $375 million research enterprise at UConn and UConn Health, including the Technology Incubation Program and the Innovation Partnership Building at UConn Tech Park. She was appointed interim president of UConn on February 1, 2022, succeeding former interim president Andrew Agwunobi, who had resigned to take an executive-level role with Humana.

Marić was named a Fellow of American Association for the Advancement of Science in 2019. She is a member of the Connecticut Academy of Science and Engineering. She is lead author of the book Solid Oxide Fuel Cells: From Fundamental Principles to Complete Systems (Boca Raton: CRC Press, 2020).

== President of the University of Connecticut ==
As President of the University of Connecticut, Marić oversees the university's $3.3 billion budget, which supports seven campuses, including its flagship campus in Storrs and an academic medical center and hospital in Farmington, over 35,000 students, and an extensive network of research and service initiatives. She also has overseen large-scale construction projects and fundraising campaigns.

Marić, with the support of the UConn Board of Trustees, has committed UConn to becoming carbon neutral by 2030 and carbon zero by 2040. In October 2023, UConn hosted a national Sustainable Clean Energy Summit, with former White House National Climate Advisor Gina McCarthy giving the keynote. Marić is applying her scientific background in clean energy technologies to support UConn's transition to clean and renewable energy.

Academic offices
Preceded by Andrew Agwunobi	President of the University of Connecticut; February 1, 2022 –	Succeeded by Incumbent
