= Roger O. Egeberg =

American physician (1902–1997)

Roger Olaf Egeberg
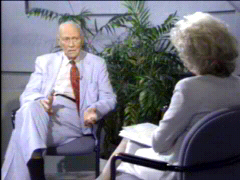
- Dr. Egeberg in an interview
- Born: November 13, 1902; Chicago, Illinois, US
- Died: September 13, 1997 (aged 94); Washington, D.C., US
- Title: Assistant Secretary for Health
- Term: 1969–1971
- Predecessor: Philip R. Lee
- Successor: Charles C. Edwards
- Political party: Democrat
- Spouse: Margaret McEchron Chahoon
- Children: One son, three daughters

Roger Olaf Egeberg, M.D. (13 November 1902 – 13 September 1997 in Washington, D.C.) was an American medical educator, administrator and advocate of public health. He was General Douglas MacArthur's personal physician during World War II in the Pacific theater. His other roles included Assistant Secretary for Health and Scientific Affairs in the Department of Health, Education, and Welfare (now the United States Department of Health and Human Services) during the Nixon administration and Dean of the University of Southern California's medical school.

== Early life and family ==
Egeberg was born in Chicago, Illinois to Hans Olaf Egeberg (1875-1932) and Ulrikka Rostrup Egeberg (1875-1932) (née Nielsen), a Norwegian immigrant family. Egeberg married a Canadian sculptor, Margaret Chahoon (25 August 1904 - 31 March 2011), in 1929. Together, they had a son and three daughters.

== Education and career ==
Egeberg received a bachelor's degree in 1925 from Cornell University where he was a member of the Quill and Dagger society. He earned his medical degree in 1929 at Northwestern University school of medicine. He became an internist and joined the faculty of Western Reserve University School of Medicine.

== Military service ==
During World War II, Egeberg was a member of the 4th General Hospital which was sent to Australia. From there he transferred to Milne Bay, Papua New Guinea (PNG) where he organised field stations and was a malaria control officer. Through determined attempts to control illnesses such as malaria and sexually transmitted diseases in PNG, Egeberg was noticed by MacArthur who made him his personal physician and aide-de-camp. Egeberg rose to the rank of colonel and was awarded the Bronze Star Medal and the Legion of Merit. At the end of the war, Egeberg treated the Prime Minister of Japan, Hideki Tojo who had shot himself. Tojo was later hanged.

== Academic positions ==
After the war, Egeberg was Chief of Medicine at Wadsworth General Hospital, head of County-University of Southern California Medical Center (1959) and Dean, USC School of Medicine (1964). After working for Nixon, Egeberg took a professorial chair at Georgetown University. In his later career, he advocated for the advanced training of doctors in geriatric medicine.

== Nixon administration ==
From 1969 to 1971, Egeberg was the Assistant Secretary for health and scientific affairs in the Department of Health, Education and Welfare. In this role, he was an advocate for expanding public health care and argued for the financing of medical programs (through the Office of Health Care Financing). During this time, Egeberg visited the USSR and developed a professional relationship with Boris Vasilevich Petrovsky, the Soviet minister of health. In the spring of 1970, while requesting $100 million to train more doctors and nurses, Egeberg alleged the Health, Education and Welfare Secretary, Robert H. Finch, and the department's Under Secretary, John C. Veneman, were not considering his advice on health matters and that Nixon's advisers were ignoring him. He said,

"The White House just doesn't appreciate, doesn't know, what is going on in the health field."

also,

"I just can't get through to Ehrlichman," (referring to John D. Ehrlichman, the president's chief aide for domestic matters.)

and,

"I may be fired because of my words and actions, but I won't quit."

Officials of the department, including Finch, expressed dissatisfaction with Egeberg's managerial skills. From 1971 to 1977, Egeberg was the health secretary's special assistant for health policy and special consultant to the president in health affairs. In 1976 and 1977, he was also special assistant for health education.

== Marijuana ==
In 1970, Egeberg introduced an amendment to legislation governing penalties for marijuana offences. The nature of a conviction for possession of marijuana was changed from felony to misdemeanor. The committee reviewing the Controlled Substances Act requested Egeberg's advice on how marijuana should be regulated. After Egeberg wrote to Harley O. Staggers, chairman of the house committee on interstate and foreign commerce, marijuana was temporarily placed in Schedule I, the most tightly-controlled category of drugs. He wrote,

"Dear Mr. Chairman, In a prior communication, comments requested by your committee on the scientific aspects of the drug classification scheme incorporated in H.R. 18583 were provided. This communication is concerned with the proposed classification of marihuana...It is presently classed in schedule I(C) along with its active constituents, the tetrahydrocannibinols and other psychotropic drugs...Some question has been raised whether the use of the plant itself produces "severe psychological or physical dependence" as required by a schedule I or even schedule II criterion. Since there is still a considerable void in our knowledge of the plant and effects of the active drug contained in it, our recommendation is that marihuana be retained within schedule I at least until the completion of certain studies now underway to resolve the issue. If those studies make it appropriate for the Attorney General to change the placement of marihuana to a different schedule, he may do so in accordance with the authority provided under section 201 of the bill."

Egeberg intended for marijuana to remain in Schedule I only until the Shafer Commission completed its report. However, Nixon refused to implement the Commission's recommendation that marijuana be legalized.

== Books ==
- The General: MacArthur and the Man He Called 'Doc.' (1984 Hippocrene Books) ISBN 0882548549, ISBN 978-0882548548
- Reaching for the world: early memories. (2000, Washington Expatriates Press) ISBN 096090624X, ISBN 978-0960906246

== External sources ==
- "Two national officials who advocated drug policy reform pass away" National Drug Strategy Network.
- Gettman, Jon Science and the end of marijuana prohibition
- "Obituary". The New York Times.
- Interview with Roger O. Egeberg 30 July 1991. Accessed 28 June 2012.
