= James O. Mason =

American physician (1930-2019)

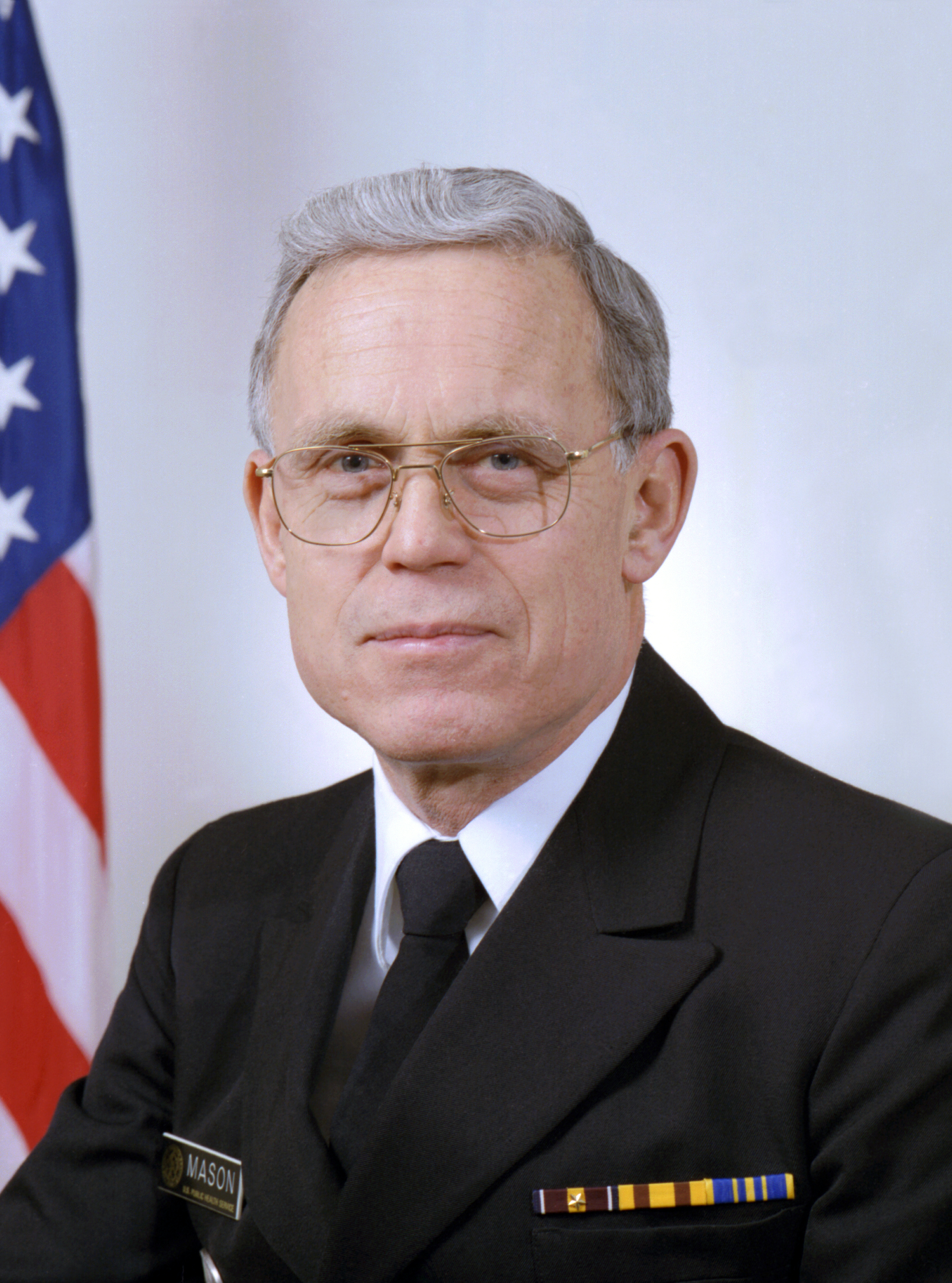

United States Assistant Secretary for Health
- In office 1989–1993
- President: George H. W. Bush
- Confidential Assistant: A. Cornelius Baker
- Preceded by: Robert E. Windom
- Succeeded by: Philip R. Lee

Surgeon General of the United States Acting
- In office October 1, 1989 – March 9, 1990
- President: Ronald Reagan; George H. W. Bush
- Preceded by: C. Everett Koop
- Succeeded by: Antonia Novello

11th Director of the Centers for Disease Control and Prevention
- In office 1983–1989
- President: Ronald Reagan
- Preceded by: William H. Foege
- Succeeded by: William L. Roper

Personal details
- Born: James Ostermann Mason; June 19, 1930 Salt Lake City, Utah, U.S.
- Died: October 9, 2019 (aged 89)
- Education: University of Utah (BA) (MD); Harvard University (PhD)

Military service
- Allegiance: United States
- Branch/service: Public Health Service
- Years of service: 1983–1993
- Rank: Admiral

James Ostermann Mason (June 19, 1930 – October 9, 2019) was an American medical doctor and public health administrator. He was the United States Assistant Secretary for Health (ASH) from 1989 to 1993 and the Acting Surgeon General of the United States from 1989 to 1990. As the ASH he was also a four-star admiral in the United States Public Health Service Commissioned Corps. He was also a director of the Centers for Disease Control and Prevention and a general authority of the Church of Jesus Christ of Latter-day Saints (LDS Church).

== Early life and education ==
Born in Salt Lake City, Utah, Mason earned B.A. and M.D. degrees from the University of Utah. Mason received an MPH degree from Harvard in 1963. In 1967, he completed a DrPH degree in public health from Harvard University.

Mason did residencies at Peter Bent Brigham Hospital and Johns Hopkins Hospital.

== Medical career ==
Mason was the first managing director of the LDS Church's Unified Welfare Services, directing the church's hospital system beginning in 1970 when the church moved general authorities to a position of developing policy and handing over the managing of professional departments to hired professionals. In this position he gave a talk in LDS general conference announcing the health missionary plan in 1971. He continued as head of the church's hospitals until 1975 when the church spun them off as Intermountain Healthcare to allow it to focus health resources more to assist members around the world.

From 1978 to 1979, Mason served as chair of the division of community medicine in the University of Utah's college of medicine.

Mason served as the executive director of the Utah Department of Health from 1979 until 1983, when he was named director of the Centers for Disease Control and Prevention (CDC) in Atlanta, Georgia; Mason held the directorship of the CDC until 1989. In 1993, he was presented with the Gorgas Medal from the Association of Military Surgeons of the United States (AMSUS).

In 1989, the U.S. Senate confirmed Mason as Assistant Secretary for Health, which made him head of the United States Public Health Service, and Acting Surgeon General. He later served as the American delegate to the World Health Organization.

== LDS Church service ==
In 1994, Mason was appointed as a general authority by the LDS Church, serving in the Second Quorum of the Seventy until 2000. From 2000 to 2003, Mason was president of the church's Bountiful Utah Temple.

As a young man, Mason served a church mission to Denmark. Before his appointment as a general authority, Mason served as a bishop, stake president, and regional representative. In 1974, while serving as Church Commissioner for Health Services, Mason wrote a pamphlet for the church titled "Attitudes of The Church of Jesus Christ of Latter-day Saints Toward Certain Medical Problems", which expresses the church's views on abortion, birth control, and homosexuality.

== Family life ==
Mason married Marie Smith in 1952 in the Salt Lake Temple and they were the parents of seven children. Mason died on October 9, 2019.
