= Andrew Agwunobi =

American physician and administrator

Interim President of the University of Connecticut
- In office July 1, 2021 – February 20, 2022
- Preceded by: Thomas C. Katsouleas
- Succeeded by: Radenka Maric

Personal details
- Born: September 12, 1965 (age 60) Scotland
- Citizenship: American
- Relatives: John O. Agwunobi
- Education: University of Jos (MD); Stanford University (MBA)
- Occupation: Physician, administrator
- Website: UConn Health

Andrew Chuma Agwunobi (born 1965) is an American physician and administrator. He was the CEO for UConn Health from 2014 to 2022 and became interim president of the University of Connecticut starting on May 19, 2021. He was the first non-white person to be UConn president.

On January 14, 2022, Agwunobi announced his resignation as interim president of UConn and CEO of UConn Health to work for Humana. His resignation took effect on February 20, 2022. Radenka Maric succeeded him as interim president.

== Early life and education ==
Agwunobi was born in Scotland in 1965 and raised in rural Scotland and Nigeria. His father, Titus Chukwuma Agwunobi, a surgeon, was an Igbo from Nigeria. His mother, Veronica Marie Stuart Shaw, a nurse, is of Scottish descent. They met while Titus Agwunobi was studying medicine at the University of St. Andrews. Both came from wealthy families, but their interracial marriage led to their parents disowning them.

A pediatrician by training, Andrew Agwunobi received an M.D. from the University of Jos in 1989 and completed his residency at the Howard University Hospital in Washington, D.C. He went on to earn an M.B.A. from the Stanford Graduate School of Business in 2001.

== Career ==
Agwunobi has held various executive positions in healthcare administration, including chief executive officer (CEO) of the Grady Health System in Atlanta, president and CEO of the Tenet South Fulton Hospital in East Point, secretary of the Florida Agency for Health Care Administration, and CEO of Providence Healthcare in Spokane. He was a managing director of Berkeley Research Group and chief operating officer of the St. Joseph Health System in California. He has practiced medicine at Harvard Vanguard Medical Associates and the Palo Alto Medical Foundation.

In November 2014, Agwunobi became interim CEO at UConn Health. He became permanent CEO and executive vice president for health affairs in 2015. In this capacity, he oversaw the entire academic and clinical enterprise, including the John Dempsey Hospital, medical and dental schools, biomedical research, a business incubator, and over 5,000 employees. He presided over six consecutive years of revenue growth averaging 10% per year, oversaw $800 million of new construction, installed a new electronic health records system, and hired more than 180 faculty. As CEO, Agwunobi earned a salary of $709,000 in 2021. In 2018, state auditors faulted his approval of salary raises for UConn employees who signed off on a $563,000 contract with Berkeley Research Group, a consulting firm for which Agwunobi worked before he took over as interim CEO. The auditors said Agwunobi's action amounted to a "potential conflict of interest."

Following the resignation of Thomas C. Katsouleas only two years into his term as UConn's 16th president, UConn's Board of Trustees appointed Agwunobi interim president effective July 1, 2021. However, Agwunobi assumed the duties of president immediately after his appointment on May 19. He remained in his position as UConn Health CEO while president.

In 2020, the Hartford Business Journal recognized Agwunobi as one of Hartford's "Power 25 in Healthcare." In 2007, Modern Healthcare named Agwunobi one of the "50 Most Powerful Physician Executives" in the United States. The Atlanta Business League named him CEO of the Year in 2005.

== Personal life ==
Agwunobi's elder brother is John O. Agwunobi, a fellow pediatrician and healthcare administrator who was the CEO of Herbalife Nutrition. He formerly was assistant secretary for health for the U.S. Department of Health and Human Services and secretary of the Florida Department of Health under Republican administrations.

Agwunobi is married to Elizabeth Nega, an Ethiopian-born physician of internal medicine. They met during his residency at Howard University. The couple have two teenage daughters, Hannah and Rebekah. Agwunobi's hobbies include reading classic books, archaeology, and writing.

== Publications ==
- Agwunobi, Andrew C. (2019). An Insider's Guide to Working with Healthcare Consultants. Chicago: Health Administration Press. ISBN 978-1-64055-099-5. OCLC 1121053561.
- Agwunobi, Andrew C. (2018). An Insider's Guide to Physician Engagement. Chicago: Health Administration Press. ISBN 978-1-56793-919-4. OCLC 985974734.

Academic offices
Preceded by Thomas C. Katsouleas	Interim President of the University of Connecticut; 2021–2022	Succeeded by Radenka Maric
