= John O. Agwunobi =

American health official

John Agwunobi
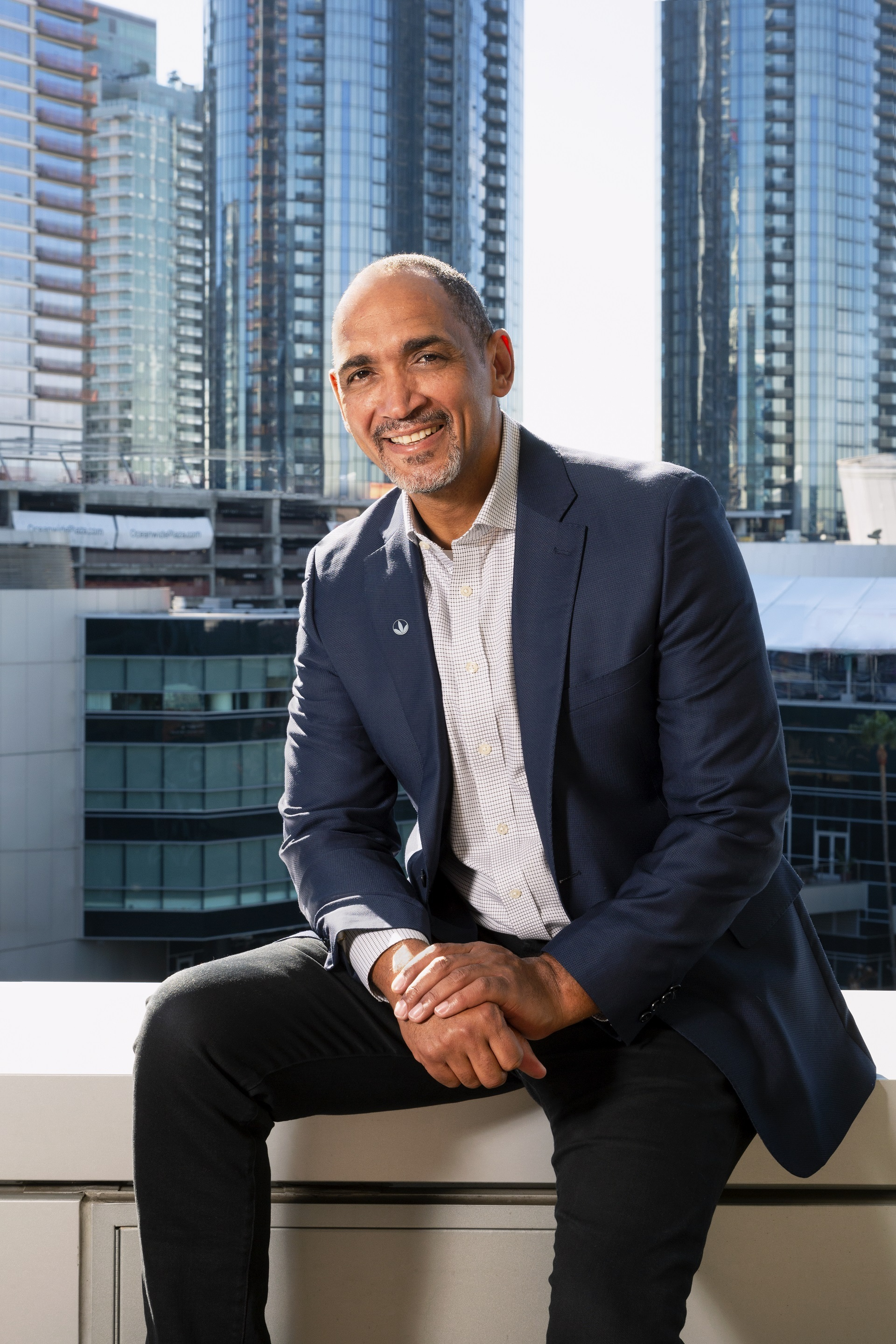
- Agwunobi in 2020

Assistant Secretary for Health
- In office January 4, 2006 – September 4, 2007
- President: George W. Bush
- Preceded by: Cristina Beato (Acting)
- Succeeded by: Joxel García

Personal details
- Born: Dundee, Scotland, UK
- Party: Republican
- Relatives: Andrew Agwunobi (brother)
- Education: University of Jos (BS, MD); Johns Hopkins University (MPH); Georgetown University (MBA)

Military service
- Allegiance: United States
- Branch/service: U.S. Public Health Service
- Years of service: 2006–2007
- Rank: Admiral
- Commands: United States Public Health Service
- Awards: Public Health Service Regular Corps Ribbon

John O. Agwunobi is a Scottish-born Nigerian-American former public health official, pediatrician, and the former chief executive officer and executive chairman of Herbalife Nutrition from March 2020 to October 2022. He was formerly senior vice-president of Walmart and president of the retailer's health and wellness business from 2007 to 2014.

Agwunobi served as assistant secretary for health for the U.S. Department of Health and Human Services and was Florida's secretary of health and state health officer from 2000 to 2005.

== Early life and education ==
Agwunobi was born in Dundee, Scotland, to a Nigerian father of Igbo descent, who was a British-trained physician, and a Scottish mother. As a teen, Agwunobi's family moved to Nigeria, where he attended high school and university. He received his medical training at the University of Jos, where his father was a professor of medicine. His brother, Andrew Agwunobi, is CEO of UConn Health and interim president of the University of Connecticut.

Agwunobi has a master's degree in public health from Johns Hopkins University, a master of business administration from Georgetown University, and a certification as a managed care executive from the American Association of Health Plans (AAHP). He completed his pediatric residency at Howard University Hospital in Washington, DC, rotating between Children's National Medical Center and the District of Columbia General Hospital.

== Public office ==
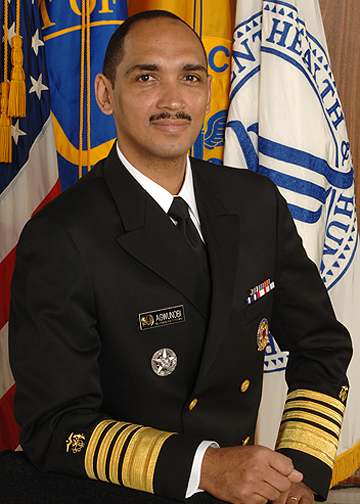
Four-star Admiral of the United States Public Health Service Commissioned Corps

Prior to his service in the federal government, Agwunobi served as Florida's secretary of health under Governor Jeb Bush from 2000 to 2005. He led Florida's public health response to four major hurricanes that struck the state in 2004. In addition, Agwunobi led the department's response to the nation's first anthrax attack, subsequently guiding the state's nationally recognized efforts to prepare for, prevent and mitigate the effects of a bioterrorism attack.

Agwunobi served as the 12th assistant secretary for health (ASH) from January 4, 2006, to September 4, 2007. The Senate confirmed him for the position on December 17, 2005. During his term as the ASH, he oversaw the Centers for Disease Control, National Institutes of Health, the Food and Drug Administration, the office of the U.S. Surgeon General and was a member of the United States Public Health Service Commissioned Corps, a uniformed service, and held the rank of four-star admiral. He also served as the U.S. representative on the World Health Organization executive board.

Agwunobi has served as vice-chair of the United States African Development Foundation. He has served as a board adviser to Shopko, a specialty retail store holding corporation and board director for Magellan Health Services.

== Corporate career ==
=== Walmart ===
In September 2007, Agwunobi was announced as Walmart's top medical professional working to expand the retailer's growth into the healthcare and wellness business. He led a team of more than 65,000 employees at the company's pharmacies, vision centers and healthcare clinics. Agwunobi later became the senior vice-president of Walmart, where he "drove down prescription medication costs and provided ongoing savings through our pharmacy offerings" before leaving in 2014.

=== Herbalife Nutrition ===
In 2016, Agwunobi joined Herbalife Nutrition, a multi-level marketing company based in California, as its chief health and nutrition officer. He became co-president in 2018 and was announced as its next chief executive officer and executive chairman in March 2020. After assuming the role, Agwunobi stated that he would focus the company's investments on weight management and sports performance. Agwunobi departed Herbalife Nutrition in October 2022 and former CEO Michael O. Johnson was named chairman and interim chief executive officer.

Political offices
Preceded by Cristina Beato; Acting	Assistant Secretary for Health; 2006–2007	Succeeded by Joxel García
