= HIV screening in the United States =

HIV screening in the United States is the use of tests to determine HIV status of individuals, as a part of general public health strategies to reduce the rate of transmission of HIV/AIDS in the United States and to lead to treatment of HIV positive individuals. As a public health measure, widespread testing is advocated by some. Programs such as the National HIV Testing Day on June 27 are used to promote it. The New England Journal of Medicine endorsed widespread testing in 2013. There are special challenges in reaching teenagers. Numerous areas have offered free and rapid HIV testing to the public, including Atlanta, Georgia on World AIDS Day, December 1.

== National HIV Testing Day ==
The National HIV Testing Day on June 27 is organized annually by the U.S. Department of Health and Human Service's AIDS.GOV program and the Centers for Disease Control and Prevention’s National Center for HIV/AIDS, Viral Hepatitis, STD, and TB Prevention Walgreens is one corporate sponsor, and offers free HIV testing on that day at a number of its drugstore locations (140 cities in 2014).

The annual observance was conceived by Troy Petenbrink, then the communications coordinator for the National Association of People with AIDS (NAPWA). Launched in 1995 in partnership with the National Alliance of State and Territorial AIDS Directors and the National Lesbian and Gay Health Association, with financial support from the Henry J. Kaiser Family Foundation, it was the first national campaign to encourage voluntary HIV-antibody testing and counseling.

== Over-the-counter testing ==
In 2012 the U.S. Food and Drug Administration announced that it had approved the first, over-the-counter (OTC) sale of home HIV test kits that do not require sending sample to a lab. The Pennsylvania-based Orasure Company holds the patent and monopoly on the oral swab technology. The FDA guidelines state that anyone 17 years of age can purchase a kit without medical training or requirement to disclose results to local medical authorities. Neither a doctor's prescription nor a parent's permission is required.

== See also ==
- World AIDS Day, December 1
