= Public Health Service Crisis Response Service Award =

Decoration of the US Public Health Service

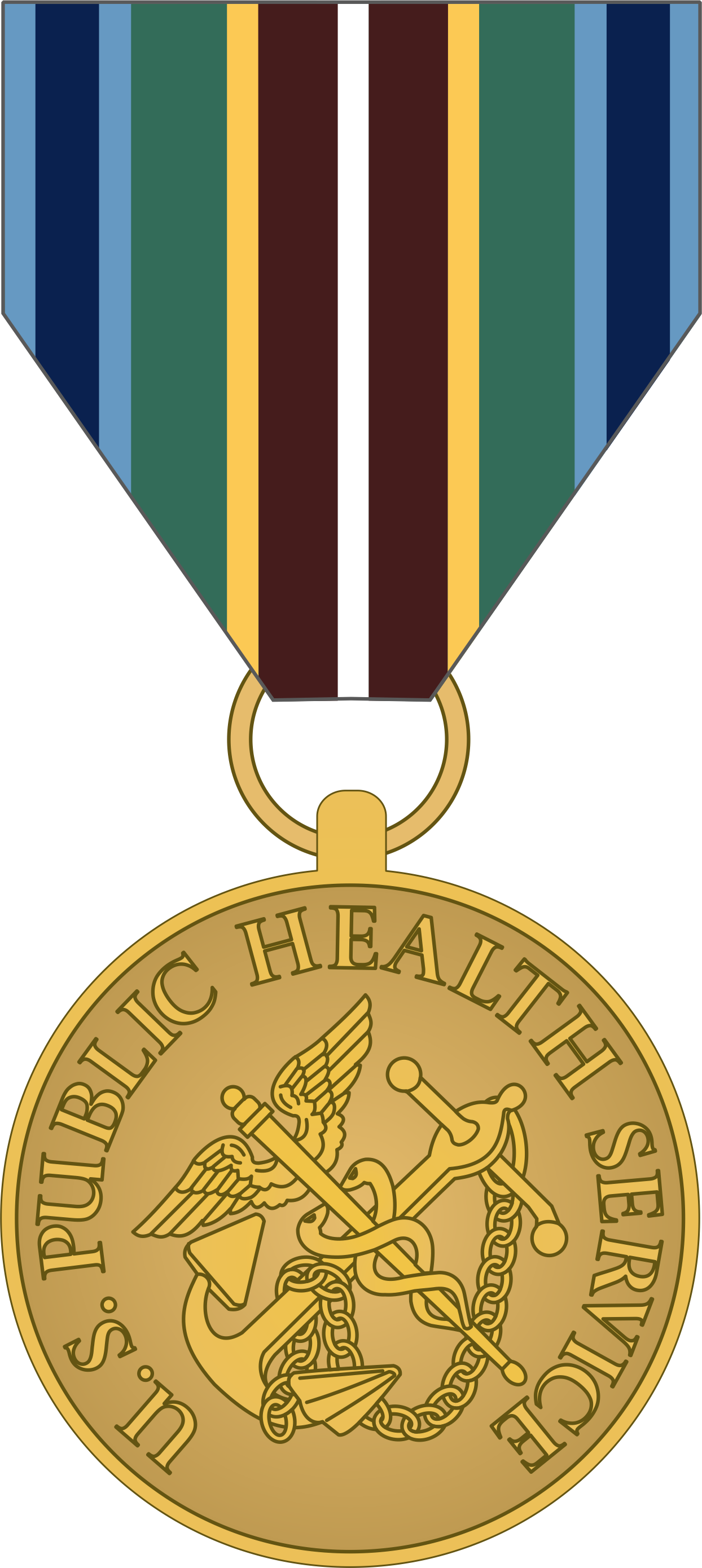
- Type: Service award
- Awarded for: Participation in a deployment for a crisis response within the United States
- Country: United States
- Presented by: United States Public Health Service
- Eligibility: Members of the United States Public Health Service Commissioned Corps
- Ribbon

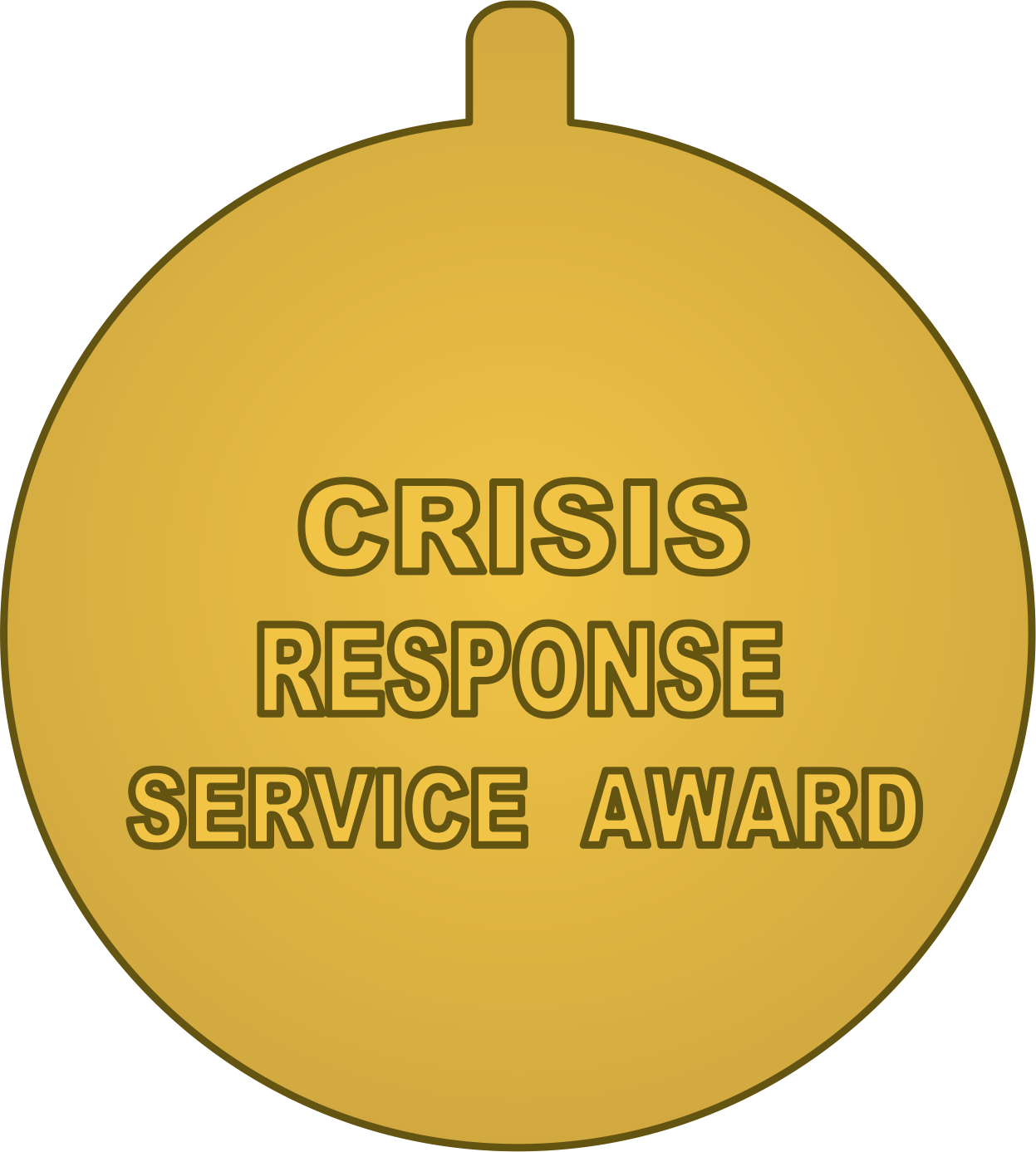
- Reverse

Precedence
- Next (higher): Isolated/Hardship Award
- Next (lower): Global Response Service Award

The Public Health Service Crisis Response Service Award is a decoration of the United States Public Health Service presented to members of the United States Public Health Service Commissioned Corps. It recognizes service in response to a crisis within the United States.

== Criteria ==
The PHS Crisis Response Service Award is awarded to officers who participate in a USPHS Commissioned Corps deployment as part of a designated response to a crisis within the United States. The USPHS Commissioned Corps defines a "crisis" response as one which responds to a natural or man-made disaster and which the Surgeon General of the United States has determined establishes eligibility for the award. To qualify, an officer must serve in a deployment away from his or her regular duty assignment, be deployed for at least 14 consecutive days, and deploy in the designated USPHS Commissioned Corps uniform unless the Surgeon General exempts him or her from the uniform requirement.

An officer may receive only one award of the Crisis Response Service Award for participation in the same crisis response regardless of the number of deployments he or she makes as part of the designated response.

The USPHS Commissioned Corps recognizes analogous service outside the United States with the Public Health Service Global Response Service Award.

== See also ==
- Awards and decorations of the Public Health Service
- Awards and decorations of the United States government
