= Assistant Secretary for Health =

USHHS primary advisor on US public health

- Seal of the United States Public Health Service

- Flag of the Assistant Secretary for Health

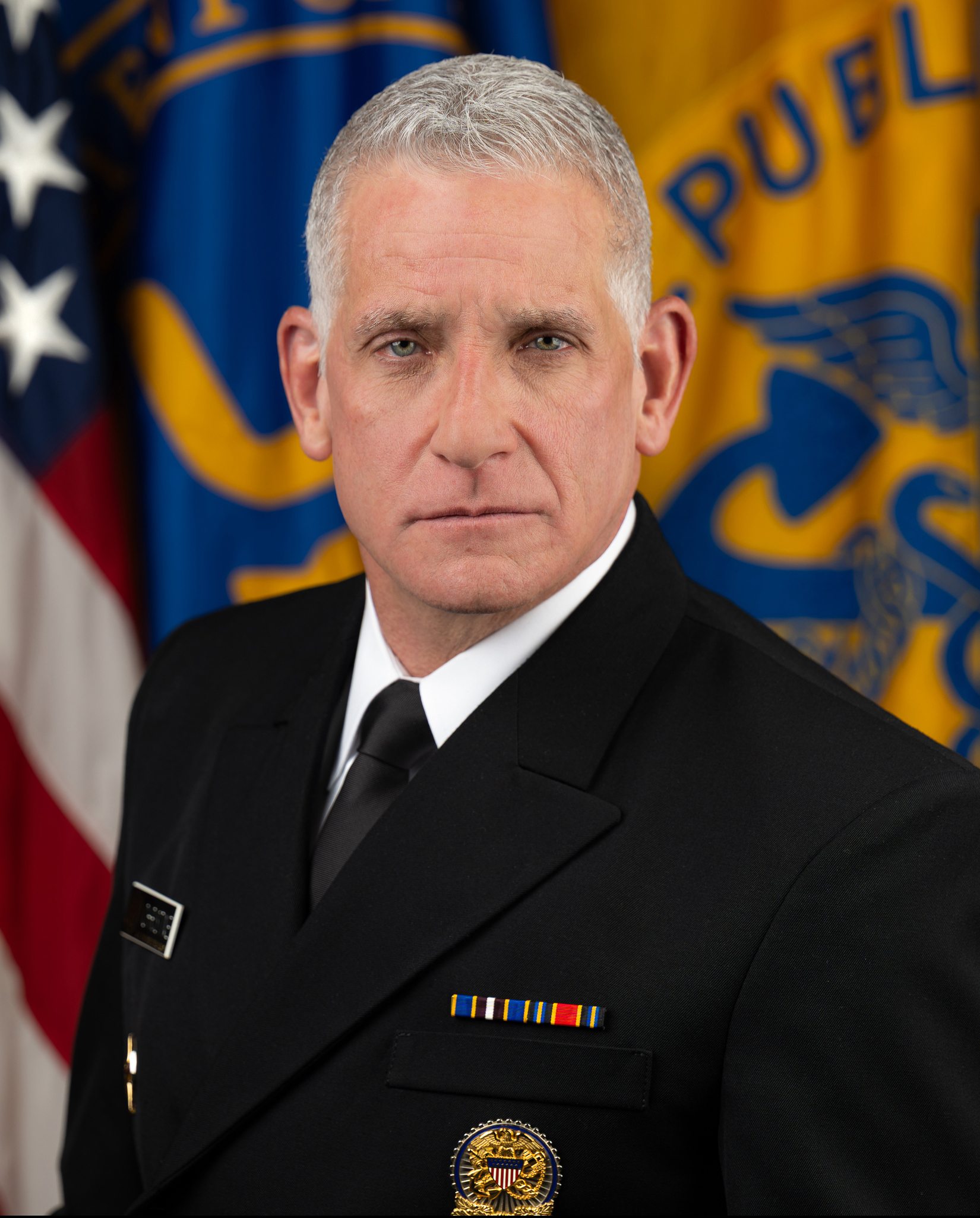
- Incumbent; Admiral Brian Christine, MD since November 11, 2025
- U.S. Public Health Service; Commissioned Corps
- Style: Assistant Secretary; Admiral
- Abbreviation: ASH; ADM
- Reports to: Secretary of Health and Human Services
- Seat: Hubert H. Humphrey Building, United States Department of Health and Human Services (HHS), Washington, D.C.
- Appointer: President of the United States; with United States Senate advice and consent
- Constituting instrument: 42 U.S.C. § 202 and 42 U.S.C. § 207
- Formation: November 2, 1965; 60 years ago
- First holder: Philip R. Lee
- Website: Official website

The assistant secretary for health (ASH) is a senior U.S. government official within the U.S. Department of Health and Human Services (HHS) who serves as the primary advisor to the secretary of health and human services on matters involving the nation's public health, and provides strategic and policy direction to the Public Health Service agencies and Commissioned Corps.

The position is a statutory Senate-confirmed presidential appointment (42 U.S.C. § 202), who may be a civilian, or a uniformed four-star admiral in the U.S. Public Health Service Commissioned Corps, and is nominated for appointment by the president. The president may also nominate a civilian appointee to also be appointed a direct commission in the commissioned corps if the nominee so chooses. The assistant secretary's office and its staff make up the Office of the Assistant Secretary for Health (OASH).

The 18th and current assistant secretary for health is Admiral Brian Christine.

== History ==
The Office of the Assistant Secretary for Health and Scientific Affairs was established on January 1, 1967, following Reorganization Plan No. 3 of 1966. The new position supplanted the surgeon general as the head of the U.S. Public Health Service (PHS), with all PHS component heads now reporting to the assistant secretary. This was seen as undermining the chain of command of the U.S. Public Health Service Commissioned Corps, beginning a long-term shift where commissioned corps officers were more responsible to the agencies they were stationed in than to the corps itself.

In 1972, the office was renamed the Office of the Assistant Secretary for Health.

In 1995, supervision of the agencies within PHS was shifted to report directly to the secretary of health and human services. This transformed the assistant secretary for health from a supervisory position in the direct chain of command, into an advisory one.

In 2010, the office's name was changed from Office of Public Health and Science to Office of the Assistant Secretary for Health.

== Office of the Assistant Secretary for Health ==
As of 2018, the Office of the Assistant Secretary for Health oversees 12 core public health offices, 10 regional health offices, and 10 presidential and secretarial advisory committees.

The stars, shoulder boards, and sleeve stripes of the Assistant Secretary for Health if serving in the U.S. Public Health Service Commissioned Corps.

== List ==
No.	Assistant secretary		Term			Pay schedule or service branch
No.	Portrait	Name	Took office	Left office	Term length	Pay schedule or service branch
1	Philip R. Lee	Philip R. Lee	November 2, 1965	1969	3 years	Executive; Schedule IV
2	Roger O. Egeberg	Roger O. Egeberg	July 14, 1969	1971	2 years	Executive; Schedule IV
3	Merlin K. DuVal	Merlin K. DuVal	July 1, 1971	January 20, 1973	1 year, 203 days	Executive; Schedule IV
4	Charles C. Edwards	Charles C. Edwards	April 18, 1973	January 5, 1975	1 year, 262 days	Executive; Schedule IV
5	Theodore Cooper	Theodore Cooper	July 1, 1975	1977	2 years	Executive; Schedule IV
6	Julius B. Richmond	Vice Admiral; Julius B. Richmond	July 13, 1977	May 14, 1981	3 years, 305 days	U.S. Public; Health Service
7	Edward Brandt Jr.	Edward Brandt Jr.	1981	1984	3 years	Executive; Schedule IV
8	Robert E. Windom	Robert E. Windom	1986	1989	3 years	Executive; Schedule IV
9	James O. Mason	Admiral; James O. Mason	1989	1993	4 years	U.S. Public; Health Service
10	Philip R. Lee	Philip R. Lee	July 2, 1993	1998	5 years	Executive; Schedule IV
11	David Satcher	Admiral; David Satcher	February 13, 1998	January 20, 2001	2 years, 342 days	U.S. Public; Health Service
-	Arthur J. Lawrence	Rear Admiral; Arthur J. Lawrence; Acting	January 20, 2001	February 8, 2002	1 year, 19 days	U.S. Public; Health Service
12	Eve Slater	Eve Slater	February 8, 2002	February 5, 2003	362 days	Executive; Schedule IV
-	Cristina V. Beato	Rear Admiral; Cristina V. Beato; Acting	February 5, 2003	January 4, 2006	2 years, 333 days	U.S. Public; Health Service
13	John O. Agwunobi	Admiral; John O. Agwunobi	January 4, 2006	September 4, 2007	1 year, 243 days	U.S. Public; Health Service
-	Don J. Wright	Don J. Wright; Acting	September 4, 2007	March 28, 2008	206 days	Executive; Schedule IV
14	Joxel García	Admiral; Joxel García	March 28, 2008	January 20, 2009	298 days	U.S. Public; Health Service
-	Steven K. Galson	Rear Admiral; Steven K. Galson; Acting	January 22, 2009	June 22, 2009	151 days	U.S. Public; Health Service
15	Howard K. Koh	Howard K. Koh	June 22, 2009	August 1, 2014	5 years, 40 days	Executive; Schedule IV
-	Karen B. DeSalvo	Karen B. DeSalvo; Acting	October 2014	January 3, 2017	More than 2 years	Executive; Schedule IV
-	Don J. Wright	Don J. Wright; Acting	January 4, 2017	February 15, 2018	1 year, 42 days	Executive; Schedule IV
16	Brett P. Giroir	Admiral; Brett P. Giroir	February 15, 2018	January 19, 2021	2 years, 339 days	U.S. Public; Health Service
-	Felicia L. Collins	Rear Admiral; Felicia L. Collins; Acting	January 21, 2021	March 26, 2021	64 days	U.S. Public; Health Service
17	Rachel L. Levine	Admiral; Rachel L. Levine	March 26, 2021	January 20, 2025	3 years, 300 days	U.S. Public; Health Service
-	Leith J. States	Leith J. States; Acting	January 20, 2025	May 26, 2025	126 days	Executive; Schedule IV
-	Dorothy Fink	Dorothy Fink; Acting	May 26, 2025	November 10, 2025	168 days	Executive; Schedule IV
18	Brian Christine	Admiral; Brian Christine	November 11, 2025	Incumbent	346 days	U.S. Public; Health Service
