= Sedgwick Memorial Medal =

Public health award

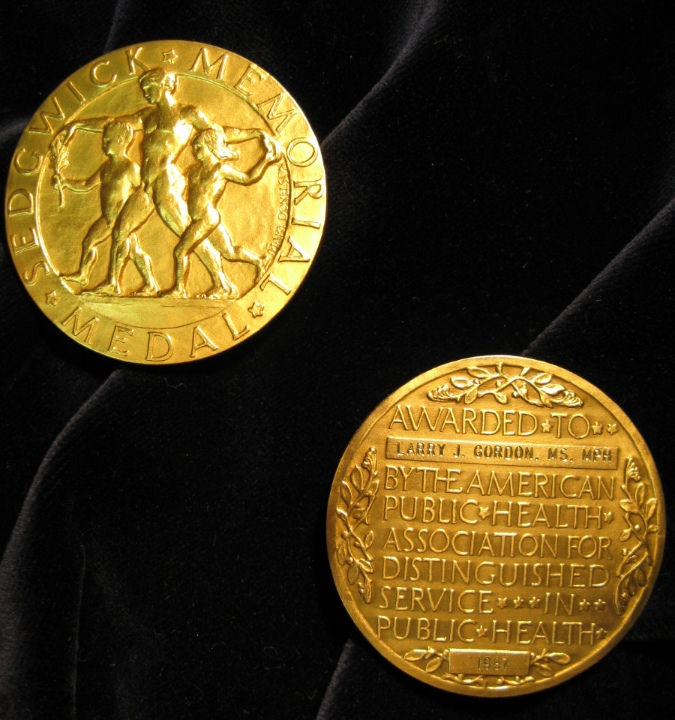
Sedgwick Memorial Medal (1987)

The Sedgwick Memorial Medal, given by the American Public Health Association, was established in 1929 for distinguished service and advancement of public health knowledge and practice. It is considered the APHA's highest honor.

The medal is established in honour of William Thompson Sedgwick (1855–1921).

== Award recipients ==
Source: APHA

- 1929 Charles V. Chapin
- 1930 Theobald Smith
- 1931 George W. McCoy
- 1932 William H. Park
- 1933 Milton J. Rosenau
- 1934 Edwin O. Jordon
- 1935 Haven Emerson
- 1936 Frederick F. Russell
- 1938 Wade H. Frost
- 1939 Thomas Parran
- 1940 Hans Zinsser
- 1941 Charles Armstrong
- 1942 C.E.A. Winslow
- 1943 James S. Simmons
- 1944 Ernest W. Goodpasture
- 1946 Karl F. Meyer
- 1947 Reginald M. Atwater
- 1948 Abel Wolman
- 1949 Henry F. Vaughan
- 1950 Rolla Eugene Dyer
- 1951 Edward S. Godfrey
- 1952 Kenneth F. Maxcy
- 1953 Carl E. Buck
- 1954 Willson G. Smillie
- 1955 Albert J. Chesley
- 1956 Frederick W. Jackson
- 1957 Lowell J. Reed
- 1958 Martha May Eliot
- 1959 Louis I. Dublin
- 1960 Fred T. Foard
- 1961 Frank G. Boudreau
- 1962 Ira V. Hiscock
- 1963 Gaylord W. Anderson
- 1964 Leona Baumgartner
- 1965 Willimina R. Walsh
- 1966 Fred L. Soper
- 1967 George Baehr
- 1968 Herman E. Hilleboe
- 1969 Marion W. Sheahan
- 1970 Hugh R. Leavell
- 1971 Margaret G. Arnstein
- 1972 Paul B. Cornely
- 1973 Isidore Sydney Falk
- 1974 Myron E. Wegman
- 1975 Leroy Edgar Burney
- 1976 Malcolm H. Merrill
- 1977 Lester Breslow
- 1978 M. Allen Pond
- 1979 Doris E. Roberts
- 1980 Lorin E. Kerr
- 1981 Dwight F. Metzler
- 1982 C. Rufus Rorem
- 1983 Milton I. Roemer
- 1984 Milton Terris
- 1985 Henrik L. Blum
- 1986 C. Arden Miller
- 1987 Larry J. Gordon
- 1988 Dorothy P. Rice
- 1989 Clarence L. Brumback
- 1990 Cecil G. Sheps
- 1991 Ruth Roemer
- 1992 Julius B. Richmond
- 1993 William H. Foege
- 1994 William H. McBeath
- 1995 Joyce Lashof
- 1996 Leonard Schuman
- 1997 Victor W. Sidel
- 1998 H. Jack Geiger
- 1999 Avedis Donabedian
- 2000 Philip R. Lee
- 2001 Myron Allukian
- 2002 C. William Keck
- 2003 E. Richard Brown
- 2004 Kenneth Olden
- 2005 Barry S. Levy
- 2006 Jonathan E. Fielding
- 2007 Mohammad N. Akhter
- 2008 John Murray Last
- 2009 Robert S. Lawrence
- 2010 William Schaffner
- 2011 David Satcher
- 2012 Richard Joseph Jackson
- 2013 Douglas Bernard Kirby
- 2014 Howard K. Koh
- 2015 Hortensia Amaro
- 2016 Lawrence W. Green
- 2017 José F. Cordero
- 2018 Risa Lavizzo-Mourey
- 2019 F. Douglas Scutchfield
- 2020 Robert K. Ross
- 2021 Oliver T. Fein
- 2022 Wafaa El-Sadr

== See also ==
- List of medicine awards
