= José F. Cordero =

Puerto Rican physician

Dr. José F. Cordero
- Born: Camuy, Puerto Rico
- Occupations: Pediatrician, Epidemiologist and Teratologist
- Spouse: Milagros Cordero

José F. Cordero is a pediatrician, epidemiologist, teratologist, Head of the Department of Epidemiology and Biostatistics at the University of Georgia's College of Public Health, and former Dean of the Graduate School of Public Health at the University of Puerto Rico. Cordero was an Assistant Surgeon General of the United States Public Health Service and the founding director of the National Center on Birth Defects and Developmental Disabilities (NCBDDD) at the Centers for Disease Control and Prevention (CDC) in Atlanta, Georgia. Much of Dr. Cordero’s research focuses on understanding the impact of endocrine disruptors and oxidative stress on preterm births and neurodevelopment. In 2017, Cordero was awarded the Sedgwick Memorial Medal from the American Public Health Association.

== Early life and education ==
Cordero was born in Camuy, Puerto Rico, where he received his primary and secondary education. After graduating from high school he enrolled in the University of Puerto Rico School of Medicine. In 1973 he earned his medical degree, then completed his internship in 1974 and his residency in 1975 at the Boston City Hospital in Boston, Massachusetts. In 1977, Cordero completed a fellowship in medical genetics at the Massachusetts General Hospital. In 1979, Cordero obtained a master's degree from the Harvard School of Public Health.

== Career ==
In November 2020, Cordero was named a volunteer member of the Joe Biden presidential transition Agency Review Team to support transition efforts related to the Department of Health and Human Services and the U.S. Consumer Product Safety Commission. His work as an epidemiologist earned him several awards such as Special Recognition Award, Association of University Centers on Disabilities, 2006 and The EP Maxwell J Schleifer Distinguished Service Award, Exceptional Parents, 2004 along with many others.

=== Centers for Disease Control and Prevention ===
After earning his master's degree, Cordero joined the Centers for Disease Control and Prevention (CDC) as an Epidemic Intelligence Service (EIS) officer. He spent 15 years working with the Birth Defects Branch on children's health and disability issues.

Together with CDC, Cordero initiated a multi-state collaborative study to identify factors that may put children at risk for autism spectrum disorders (ASDs) and other developmental disabilities. Cordero was quoted as saying

"We hope this national study will help us learn more about the characteristics of children with ASDs, factors associated with developmental delays, and how genes and the environment may affect child development"

In 1994, Cordero was appointed deputy director of the National Immunization Program, where he made important and long-lasting contributions to one of the nation's most successful public health programs. The Children's Health Act of 2000 created the National Center on Birth Defects and Developmental Disabilities (NCBDDD) in Atlanta, Georgia and, in 2001, Cordero was both a founding member and its first director. NCBDDD is a leading international institution devoted to research and prevention of birth defects and developmental disabilities, and the promotion of health amongst people of all ages who are living with disabilities.

Cordero, who worked for 27 years at the CDC and served as an Assistant Surgeon General of the Public Health Service, is the current Director of the Department of Epidemiology and Biostatistics at the University of Georgia's College of Public Health, and former Dean of the Graduate School of Public Health at the University of Puerto Rico. His work has been published in many national and international scientific and medical journals. Cordero is affiliated with the Mount Sinai Medical Center of New York City.

In 2017, Cordero was awarded the Sedgwick Memorial Medal from the American Public Health Association. The "Sedgwick Memorial Medal", is the APHA's highest honor awarded for distinguished service and advancement of public health knowledge and practice.

==== Eradication of Rubella ====
Rubella (German measles), is a major cause of birth defects that can be prevented through vaccination. Cordero, whose work has been published in many national and international journals, has promoted the eradication of the disease. He has also promoted research to determine the causes of birth defects and developmental disabilities, and has promoted efforts to prevent serious birth defects (such as use of folic acid to prevent spina bifida). He is a strong supporter of programs that promote wellness of persons with disabilities. Cordero served as President of the Teratology Society, a professional research society devoted to the prevention of birth defects.

==== Awards ====
- Sedgwick Memorial Medal for Distinguished Service, American Public Health Association, 2017
- Josef Warkany Lecturer, Teratology Society, 2017
- Leadership Award, March of Dimes, 2006
- Lifetime Achievement Award, Fragile X Association, 2006
- Special Recognition Award, Association of University Centers on Disabilities, 2006
- John Snow Award, Epidemiology Section, American Public Health Association, 2006
- The EP Maxwell J Schleifer Distinguished Service Award, Exceptional Parents, 2004
- Surgeon General's Exemplary Service Medal, United States Public Health Service, 2002, 2006
- Secretary’s Award for Distinguished Services, United States Department of Health and Human Services, 2000
- Public Health Service Meritorious Service Medal, 1993
- Arthur S. Flemming Award, Outstanding Government Scientist, Washington, DC Downtown Jaycees, 1988

== See also ==
- List of Puerto Ricans
- Puerto Rican scientists and inventors
