= Willimina R. Walsh =

Associate director of the American Public Health Association

Willimina Rayne Walsh (1900 – 1966) was the associate director of the American Public Health Association. She was the recipient of the Sedgwick Memorial Medal in 1965 for her work on the growth and expansion of the association.

Walsh worked for APHA for 45 years beginning in 1920. Her work there included managing and overseeing the annual meetings—their sites as well as their programs—in addition to bringing in more advertising for The American Journal of Public Health. During her tenure, the membership of APHA grew from 3700 people to 16,000 people. She was active in public health affairs, speaking publicly about the need for increased public health measures. Many spoke of her "behind the scenes" work on various initiatives including the editorial board of Health Laboratory Science who credited her with helping them launch their journal.

Walsh was raised in Lawrence, Massachusetts, and attended the State Normal School in Lowell, Massachusetts, where she graduated with honors. She married John Walsh in New York City, on April 16, 1926.
