= Lasker–Bloomberg Public Service Award =

Humanitarian and service award

The Lasker–Bloomberg Public Service Award, known from 1946 until 2000 as the Albert Lasker Public Service Award and then from 2000 until 2009 as the Mary Woodard Lasker Public Service Award, is one of four Lasker Awards awarded by the Lasker Foundation to honor an individual or organization whose public service has profoundly enlarged the possibilities for medical research and the health sciences and their impact on the health of the public.

The award carries an honorarium of $250,000. It is presented to a winner selected from among policy makers, journalists, philanthropists, advocates, scientists, and public health professionals.

The award is named for the philanthropists Albert Lasker and Michael R. Bloomberg. Initially known as the Albert Lasker Public Service Award, it was known from 2000 to 2009 as the Mary Woodard Lasker Public Service Award in honour of Albert Lasker's wife.

== Recipients ==
- 2024 Quarraisha Abdool Karim and Salim S. Abdool Karim
- 2022 Lauren Gardner
- 2019 Gavi, the Vaccine Alliance
- 2017 Planned Parenthood
- 2015 Médecins Sans Frontières
- 2013 Bill Gates and Melinda Gates
- 2011 The Clinical Center of the National Institutes of Health
- 2009 Michael Bloomberg
- 2007 Anthony Fauci
- 2005 Nancy Brinker
- 2003 Christopher Reeve
- 2001 William Foege
- 2000 Betty Ford, Harold P. Freeman, David J. Mahoney, The Science Times of The New York Times and John Edward Porter
- 1995 Mark O. Hatfield
- 1993 Paul G. Rogers and Nancy Wexler
- 1991 Robin Chandler Duke and Thomas P. O'Neill Jr.
- 1989 Lewis Thomas
- 1988 Lowell P. Weicker Jr.
- 1986 Ma Haide (George Hatem)
- 1985 Lane W. Adams and Ann Landers (Eppie Lederer)
- 1984 Henry J. Heimlich
- 1983 Maurice R. Hilleman and Saul Krugman
- 1979 John Foster Wilson
- 1978 Elliot L. Richardson and Theodore Cooper
- 1976 World Health Organization
- 1975 Jules C. Stein
- 1973 Warren Magnuson
- 1968 Lister Hill
- 1967 Claude Pepper
- 1966 Eunice Kennedy Shriver
- 1965 Lyndon Baines Johnson
- 1963 Melvin R. Laird and Oren Harris
- 1960 John B. Grant and Abel Wolman
- 1959 Maurice Pate
- 1958 Basil O'Connor
- 1957 Frank G. Boudreau, C.J. Van Slyke and Reginald M. Atwater
- 1956 William P. Shepard
- 1955 Robert D. Defries, The Menninger Foundation, Nursing Services of the U.S. Public Health Service, Pearl McIver and Margaret G. Arnstein
- 1954 Leona Baumgartner
- 1953 Felix J. Underwood and Earle B. Phelps
- 1952 G. Brock Chisholm and Howard A. Rusk
- 1951 Florence R. Sabin
- 1950 Eugene Lindsay Bishop
- 1949 Marion W. Sheahan
- 1948 R.E. Dyer and Martha M. Eliot
- 1947 Alice Hamilton
- 1946 Alfred Newton Richards and Fred L. Soper

== See also ==
- List of medicine awards
