= Lawrence W. Green =

Lawrence W. Green is an American specialist in public health education. He is best known by health education researchers as the originator of the PRECEDE model and co-developer of the PRECEDE-PROCEED model, which has been used throughout the world to guide health program intervention design, implementation, and evaluation and has led to more than 1000 published studies, applications and commentaries on the model in the professional and scientific literature.

== Early life ==
Green received his B.S. in 1962 from the University of California-Berkeley. He then became a Ford Foundation project associate and a commissioned officer of the US Public Health Service with the University of California Family Planning Research and Development Project in Dhaka, East Pakistan (now Bangladesh), serving from 1963 through 1965. He returned to Berkeley, where he earned his M.P.H. in 1966 and Dr.P.H. in 1968, both in public health education. From 1968 to 1970, he was lecturer and doctoral program coordinator at Berkeley's School of Public Health.

== Career ==
In 1970, he moved to the Johns Hopkins Bloomberg School of Public Health as an assistant professor. During nine years, he rose from assistant professor to professor and served as assistant dean, director of health education studies for the Health Services Research Center and for the Oncology Center, and founding head of the Division of Health Education.

In 1979, President Carter appointed Green as first director of the Office of Health Information, Health Promotion, Physical Fitness and Sports Medicine (now the Office of Disease Prevention and Health Promotion). That office coordinated development of "Healthy People: The Surgeon General's Report on Health Promotion and Disease Prevention" (1979) and the 1990 "Objectives for the Nation" (1981), which have served as the blueprint for the nation's public health policies to this day. His office also established the National Health Information Clearinghouse, and a variety of national surveys, campaigns, and federal research and demonstration programs in disease prevention and health promotion.

On leaving government, in 1981, Green spent a year as visiting lecturer in health policy at the Harvard Center for Health Policy Education and Research, and in the Harvard schools of medicine and public health. He then moved to the University of Texas Health Science Center at Houston (UTHealth) as founding director of the Center for Health Promotion Research and Development (now Center for Health Promotion and Prevention Research) and professor in the Department of Family Practice and Community Medicine in the McGovern Medical School (then the University of Texas Medical School at Houston and professor of Behavioral Sciences and Community Health in the School of Public Health, serving in these roles from 1982 to 1988. During his tenure at UTHealth, he also helped establish the Southwest Center for Prevention Research, serving as its co-director. He was also associate director of the Institute for Health Policy Education and Research at UTHealth during this period.

As vice president and director of the National Health Promotion Program of the Henry J. Kaiser Family Foundation from 1988 to 1991, he and his staff developed a community development strategy for grant making called the Social Reconnaissance method. Elements of this were adopted by other foundations after it was featured in Foundation News and won the Foundation Award of the Association of Prevention Professionals. A national media campaign organized by his staff, called Project LEAN (Low-fat Eating for America Now), won awards and helped launch many of the industry-professional collaborations that have contributed to the reduction of dietary fat in the American food supply.

From 1991 through 1999, he was professor in the Department of Health Care & Epidemiology and Head of the Division of Health Promotion and Preventive Medicine at the University of British Columbia. He was also director of the university's Institute of Health Promotion Research.

Returning to the United States, he was distinguished fellow/visiting scientist at the Centers for Disease Control and Prevention (CDC) from 1999 to 2004. He was director of the CDC-World Health Organization Collaborating Center on Global Tobacco Control from 1999 to 2001 and acting director of the CDC's Office on Smoking and Health in 2001. He directed the Office of Science & Extramural Research of CDC's Public Health Practice Program Office from 2001 to 2004.

He was Visiting Professor of Health and Society at the University of Maryland College of Health & Human Performance (now School of Public Health) in College Park, Maryland, from December 2004 through June, 2005. Since fall of 2005, Green has been adjunct professor in the Department of Epidemiology and Biostatistics at the University of California at San Francisco. He also served as director of the Social and Behavioral Sciences Program and co-director of the Society, Diversity & Disparities Program of the Comprehensive Cancer Center.

He currently serves as associate editor of the Annual Review of Public Health, and on the editorial boards of the American Journal of Preventive Medicine, the American Journal of Health Behavior and 12 other journals in his field. His textbooks have been widely adopted—Health Program Planning: An Educational and Ecological Approach co-authored with Marshall Kreuter is in its 4th edition and Community and Population Health co-authored with Judith Ottoson is in its 8th edition.

== Honors and awards ==
He is a past president and distinguished fellow of the Society for Public Health Education and honorary fellow of the American School Health Association. He is a fellow of the American Academy of Behavioral Medicine Research, the Society of Behavioral Medicine, and the American Academy of Health Behavior and was the first recipient of the latter's Research Laureate Medal. He has been recipient of two of the American Public Health Association's highest awards, the Distinguished Career Award and Award of Excellence. He has also received the Presidential Citation, Scholar Award, and Distinguished Service Award of the Association for the Advancement of Health Education, and was elected to the Institute of Medicine, National Academy of Science.

He was awarded the 2016 Sedgwick Memorial Medal by the American Public Health Association.

== See also ==
- PRECEDE-PROCEED model
- Health promotion
