= Paul Cornely =

American physician, public health pioneer and civil rights activist

Paul Bertau Cornely
- Born: 9 March 1906
- Died: 9 February 2002 (aged 95)
- Education: University of Michigan (BA, MD, PhD)
- Scientific career
- Workplaces: Howard University; Lincoln Hospital
- Thesis: A survey of post graduate medical education in the united states and an inquiry into the educational needs of the general practitioner. (1934)

Paul Bertau Cornely (March 9, 1906 – February 9, 2002) was an American physician, public health pioneer, and civil rights activist. In 1934, he became the first African American to earn a doctoral degree in public health. He was elected President of the American Public Health Association in 1970.

== Early life and education ==
Cornely was born in Pointe-à-Pitre, Guadeloupe. His mother was Adrienne Mellon and his father Eleodore Cornely. At the age of three his family moved to Puerto Rico. He moved to the United States as a teenager, and grew up mainly in Harlem and, later, then Detroit. He attended the University of Michigan, where he earned his bachelor's degree, medical, and public health degrees. At the time, very few medical schools admitted Black students, and segregation limited medical students' options for internships and specialization. During his medical studies, Cornely was one of only four Black students in a class of 250. He was also a student during the Great Depression (which particularly impacted Black communities in the United States) and had to work to support himself throughout his studies. He later recalled that, during his final year of medical school, he did not know whether he would be able to complete his training because of the lack of jobs for funding it. Eventually, his medical studies were supported by the Julius Rosenwald fund. Because of segregation, Black physicians were allowed to intern only at Black hospitals, which were often overcrowded and had poor safety standards. Cornely was an intern at Lincoln Hospital, which was financially supported by wealthy white donors because white people believed that treating diseases amongst Black communities “would prevent spreading diseases to whites.” Upon finishing his internship, Cornely was not able to find a surgical residency program that would admit Black physicians, so he returned to the University of Michigan to complete a public health doctoral degree. His doctoral research considered postgraduate medical education in the United States. He specialized in hygiene and public health. In 1934, he became the first Black person to earn a doctorate in public health in the United States. While at the University of Michigan, Cornely was supported by John Sundwall, the first director of the University of Michigan health service, and Warren Forsythe, then-President of the American Public Health Association.

== Research and career ==
In 1934, Cornely joined the faculty of the Howard University College of Medicine. At Howard, Cornely developed a program that concentrated on public health provision to underserved communities. He worked in preventative medicine and, in 1942, was named Head of the Department of Bacteriology. In his early career, he visited historically black colleges and universities (HBCUs) across the United States, where he monitored the quality of health centers and other campus facilities. As part of this work, he identified severe shortcomings in the number of healthcare workers (some 19 nurses to serve 24,000 students) and was not impressed by the sanitary conditions of cafeterias. He found that the dormitories were overcrowded and rarely provided suitable facilities for personal hygiene or studying. On his return to Howard University, Cornely wrote a series of recommendations to improve the living conditions of students at HBCUs. He was made Director of the Howard University Hospital, where he studied tuberculosis, sexually transmitted infections and scarlet fever. He worked alongside Dorothy Celeste Boulding Ferebee, an African American gynecologist and civil rights activist.

Cornely became involved with the civil rights movement in the 1950s and planned the Imhotep National Conference on hospital integration. The conference was named after Imhotep, an Egyptian physician. The Imhotep conference series hoped to encourage voluntary desegregation; looking to give Black communities access to quality care at otherwise white hospitals. While the conference series raised public awareness about the impact of racism on healthcare, it was largely boycotted by white hospitals and nursing schools. In 1963, Cornely attended the March on Washington for Jobs and Freedom, for which he served as the medical coordinator. The Imhotep conferences continued until Lyndon B. Johnson passed the Civil Rights Act of 1964.

At Howard University, Cornely advocated for culturally sensitive training to be given to white healthcare providers. In particular, Cornely called for psychiatrists and psychologists to better recognize the impacts of racism and discrimination on mental health. He led several initiatives to increase the representation of people of color in healthcare, from physicians to policymakers. In 1967, Cornely worked with the American Public Health Association to lead a nationwide conference on “The Health Status of the Negro."

In 1968, he organized the Black Caucus of Health Workers, which continues to support African-American public health workers to this day. Working with then-American Public Health Association President Lester Breslow, Cornely traveled across the United States investigating the physical health and working conditions of people of color. He visited Houston, California, and Montana, where he observed chronic neglect and abuse of people of color at the hands of government officials.

Cornely frequently called out pseudoscientific studies, all of which ignore the social determinants of health and well-being, that claimed Black people were inherently inferior to whites. In 1985, he wrote that “discrimination and segregation have no place in health.” Beyond civil rights, Cornely was an advocate for public health for all and argued that the government should provide healthcare to all citizens before getting "a man on the moon."

Cornely was aware of the Tuskegee Syphilis Experiment throughout its existence, and taught it as a case study to African-American medical students at Howard University. In later life, he described his failure to realize its ethical problems as a major mistake: "I considered myself to be an activist...yet here right under my nose something is happening and I'm blind." He felt that it raised issues of racism and classism: "I saw it as an academician. It shows you how we looked at human beings, especially blacks who were expendable."

In 1973, after almost forty years at Howard University, Cornely retired as a professor emeritus of Community Health.

== Academic service ==
In 1939, Cornely founded the National Student Health Association. In 1962, Cornely was the founding President of the District of Columbia Public Health Association, which went on to become the Metropolitan Washington Public Health Association. In 1970, he was the first Black person to be elected President of the American Public Health Association.

== Awards and honors ==
His awards and honors include:

- 1968: Honorary Doctorate from the University of Michigan
- 1969: Elected President of the American Public Health Association
- 1972: American Public Health Association Sedgwick Memorial Medal
- 1972: Appointed to the Rockefeller Commission on Population Growth and the American Future

== Selected publications ==
His publications include;

- King, Ernest Q. (1950-05-06). "Clinical Observations on the Use of Terramycin Hydrochloride". Journal of the American Medical Association. 143 (1): 1–4. doi:10.1001/jama.1950.02910360003001. ISSN 0002-9955. PMID 15415221.
- Cornely, Paul B. (1956). "Segregation and Discrimination in Medical Care in the United States". American Journal of Public Health and the Nation's Health. 46 (9): 1074–1081. doi:10.2105/ajph.46.9.1074. ISSN 0002-9572. PMC 1624033. PMID 13354824.
- Cornely, Paul B. (1944-03-25). "Distribution of Negro Physicians in the United States in 1942". Journal of the American Medical Association. 124 (13): 826. doi:10.1001/jama.1944.02850130012005. ISSN 0002-9955.

== Personal life ==
Cornely became a naturalized American citizen in 1934, the same year he married Mae Stewart. He died on February 9, 2002. In honor of Cornely, the University of Michigan established the Cornely Postdoctoral Programme, which provides support to public health scholars “who are conducting research on the clarification, reduction, and elimination of racial and ethnic health disparities.” In 1984, The Physician Forum launched the Paul Cornely Award.
