= Terris (surname) =

Terris is a surname. Notable people with the surname include:

- Archibald Terris (1873–1938), Canadian politician in Nova Scotia
- Harold A. Terris (1916–2001), Canadian politician in New Brunswick
- John Terris (1939–2026), New Zealand politician
- Kevin Terris (1944–2008), American racing driver
- Malcolm Terris (1941–2020), English actor
- Milton Terris (1915–2002), American physician
- Norma Terris (1904–1989), American theater performer
- Sid Terris (1904–1974), American lightweight boxer

== See also ==
- Terriss
