= Terence E. Carroll =

American historian

Terence E. Carroll earned his B.A. in history from Wayne State University and an M.A. in history from Columbia University. His thesis mentor at Columbia was famed historian Richard Hofstadter. Upon graduation from Columbia, he joined the Detroit Historical Museum as Curator of Industrial History. It was during his time with the Detroit Museum that he became interested in the history of public health.

In 1955, he became assistant managing director of the Michigan Credit Union League. When the Michigan Credit Union League acquired ownership of the League Life Insurance Company, Carroll became executive vice president and chief operating officer of the company.

In 1960 became director of the National Institute on Rehabilitation and Health Services (NIRHS). He founded and was first editor of the institute's journal Rehabilitation & Health. His tenure as director of the NIRHS was marked by a focus on issues of occupational health and safety and contributed to legislative initiatives in this area under the Kennedy and Johnson administrations, including the Federal Coal Mine Health and Safety Act of 1969 and the Occupational Safety and Health Act of 1970. Much of this work was accomplished in collaboration with his colleagues in the labor movement, especially Lorin Kerr of the United Mine Workers Department of Occupational Health. His collaboration with union leaders during this period also led to the founding of the New York City Labor-Rehabilitation Liaison Project as well as the Sidney Hillman Health Center in Rochester, New York.

He served as president of the District of Columbia Rehabilitation Association and president of the District of Columbia Public Health Association. He also was executive director of the Comprehensive Health Planning Council of Southeastern Michigan (CHPC-SEM). He was treasurer of the Ferndale Cooperative, the nation's largest consumer coop, now known as Credit Union One.

In 1973, he succeeded Milton Terris as the National Association for Public Health Policy's second president. He died on October 15, 2009.
