= Lorin E. Kerr =

Born in Toledo, Ohio, in 1909, Lorin Edgar Kerr was educated at the University of Toledo where he received his B.A. in 1931 and at the University of Michigan, receiving his M.D. in 1935 and a M.S.P.H. in 1939. From 1937 to 1944 he served in municipal and county public health departments in Ohio and Michigan. Kerr joined the United States Public Health Service in 1944, first in the War Food Administration and later in the Industrial Hygiene Division. While with the Industrial Hygiene Division he provided consultant services for labor unions which were then beginning to develop their own medical care programs.

In October 1948 Kerr joined the newly formed Welfare and Retirement Fund of the United Mine Workers of America, simultaneously accepting an appointment as an area medical administrator in Morgantown, West Virginia. From 1951 to 1969 he served as assistant to the medical director of the Welfare and Retirement Fund. While with the fund Kerr developed the U.M.W.A. Department of Occupational Health, the first occupational medical program to be established by a major labor union. In 1969 he was appointed as the first director of the department, a position he held for years.

Kerr was a leader in the field of occupational health for more than four decades and has had an important impact on legislation and on the medical and public health professions. Coal workers' pneumonoconiosis (black lung disease) was one of Kerr's major concerns from the beginning of his employment by the UMWA and it became his primary responsibility after his appointment as director of the Department of Occupational Health. Along with Terence E. Carroll of the National Institute of Rehabilitation and Health Services, Kerr and his colleagues in the UMWA played a major role in gaining recognition of black lung as a disease entity and cause of disability. Their efforts led to passage of the Federal Coal Mine Health and Safety Act of 1969, which created a black lung compensation program for coal miners, and its amendment in 1972, that extended benefits to all miners with fifteen or more years of service who suffered respiratory impairment, whether pneumonoconiosis was pathologically verifiable or not. The recognition of, and compensation for, black lung disease helped to create a much broader definition of the relationship between occupation and disease.

In addition to his service with the United Mine Workers, Kerr has participated actively in the American Public Health Association (president, 1974), the Group Health Association of America (president, 1966–1968), and the National Association for Public Health Policy. The American Public Health Association's Section on Occupational Health and Safety awards the annual Lorin Kerr Award for leadership in public policy advocacy. He was a visiting professor at Howard University College of Medicine from 1952 to 1976 and served on the Advisory Council to the Secretary of Health, Education, and Welfare on Coal Mine Health Research in 1970. He has appeared frequently before Congressional committees as an advocate and expert witness on occupational and environmental health issues.

Family Parents are.. Lorin E. Kerr and Florence B. Wileman Children are.... Judith, Susan, John Grandparents are... George W. Kerr and Amy A. Pyle

On the maternal side his mother, Florence Wileman Kerr, was the granddaughter of Esther Coates…one of the first women physicians in the United States. Great Grandparents are... Thomas Kerr and Lavina Demuth Great Great Grandparents are... Hamilton Kerr and Susannah Niswonger (Her father was Colonel John Niswonger) Great Great Great Grandparents are... Matthew Kerr and Margaret Work
