= Douglas Kirby =

American research scientist (1943–2012)

Douglas Bernard Kirby
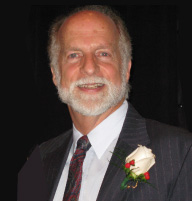
- Born: October 9, 1943; Walla Walla, Washington, U.S.
- Died: December 22, 2012 (aged 69); Cotopaxi, Ecuador
- Education: University of Chicago; UC Berkeley; UCLA (PhD, Sociology)
- Occupations: Research scientist; sociologist
- Employer: ETR Associates
- Known for: Research on adolescent sexual behavior; evaluation of sex education and HIV/STD prevention programs

Douglas Bernard Kirby (October 9, 1943 − December 22, 2012) was senior research scientist for ETR Associates in Scotts Valley, California, and one of the world’s leading experts on the effectiveness of school and community programs in the reduction of adolescent sexual risk-taking behaviors. In recent years he had also undertaken research and analysis on the impact of HIV/AIDS prevention programs in Uganda under the auspices of the World Health Organization, USAID, and other organizations.

Kirby authored over 100 articles, chapters and monographs on these programs including the widely acclaimed Emerging Answers 2007: Research Findings on Programs to Reduce Teen Pregnancy and Sexually Transmitted Diseases which he produced for the National Campaign to Prevent Teen and Unplanned Pregnancy. It is a comprehensive review of 115 program evaluations to help determine the most effective approaches to preventing teen pregnancy and STDs. It paints a detailed picture of the protective factors associated with adolescent risk taking behavior and identifies important characteristics of effective sexuality and HIV education programs. His recent research has shown strong evidence for the effectiveness of comprehensive sex and STD/HIV programs and limited evidence for the effectiveness of sexual abstinence programs.

== Biography ==
Kirby was born in Walla Walla, Washington. He did his undergraduate education at the University of Chicago and UC Berkeley, receiving his Bachelor of Arts in 1966. After a stint as a Vista volunteer in Appalachia, Kirby attended UCLA where he received his Ph.D. in sociology in 1975. From 1977 to 1983 he worked as director of the Social Science Group for Mathtech, Inc. in Washington D.C. While at Mathtech he directed a research project to analyze the state of sex education in the United States. From 1983 to 1988 he worked with The Center for Population Options (now Advocates for Youth) and did a national study on the impact of school health programs on teen sexual behavior. In 1988, Kirby went to work for ETR Associates in Scotts Valley, California, where he served as senior research scientist and director of many projects on adolescent health and risk taking behavior. His father, Bernard C. Kirby, was a sociology professor at San Diego State University (1954–1975), and his brother Robion Kirby, is a professor of mathematics at UC Berkeley. Kirby died of a heart attack at the age of 69 on December 22, 2012, while climbing Cotopaxi volcano in Ecuador. He was remembered by the Santa Cruz Sentinel as being "known throughout the world as the leading expert on the effectiveness of school and community programs in reducing adolescent sexual risk-taking behavior."

== Professional awards ==
- Sedgwick Memorial Medal, American Public Health Association, 2013
- American School Health Association William A Howe Award. Tampa Florida, 2008.
- American School Health Association John P McGovern Award, Tampa Florida, 2008.
- The Society for the Scientific Study of Sexuality Award for Distinguished Scientific Achievement, Puerto Rico, 2008.
- South Carolina Campaign to Prevent Teen Pregnancy Award for Outstanding Contribution to Research in Teen Pregnancy Prevention, Columbia, South Carolina, 2005.
- CACSAP Beatrice Gore Award, California Alliance Concerned with School-Age Parenting and Pregnancy Prevention, San Francisco, 2005.
- AASECT Professional Standard of Excellence Award 2005, American Association of Sex Educators, Counselors and Therapists, Portland, 2005.
- NOAPPP 2004 Outstanding Researcher Award, National Organization for Adolescent Pregnancy Prevention and Parenting, New Orleans, 2004.
- ASHA Research Award for Outstanding Contributions to Research in School Health, American School Health Association, Denver, 1998.

== Selected publications ==
- Kirby, D (2008) The Impact of Abstinence and Comprehensive Sex and STD/HIV Education Programs on Adolescent Sexual Behavior Sexuality Research and Social Policy (2008;5(3):6-17)
- Kirby, D (2007) Emerging Answers 2007: Research Finding on Programs to Reduce Teen Pregnancy and Sexually Transmitted Diseases Washington, D.C.: The National Campaign to Prevent Teen and Unplanned Pregnancy.
- Kirby, D., Rolleri, L., & Wilson, M. (2007) Tool to Assess the Characteristics of Effective Sex and STD/HIV Education Programs. Washington, D.C.: Healthy Teen Network
- Kirby D. (2006) Comprehensive sex education: Strong public support and persuasive evidence of impact, but little funding. Archives of Pediatrics and Adolescent Medicine, 160, 1182–1184
- Kirby, D., Obasi, A., & Laris, B. (2006) The effectiveness of sex education and HIV education interventions in schools in developing countries. In D. Ross, B. Dick & J. Ferguson (Eds.) Preventing HIV/AIDS in Young People: A Systematic Review of the Evidence from Developing Countries. Geneva: World Health Organization.
- Kirby, D., Lepore, G., & Ryan, J. (2005) Sexual Risk and Protective Factors: Factors Affecting Teen Sexual Behavior, Pregnancy, Childbearing. Washington DC: The National Campaign to Prevent Teen Pregnancy
- Kirby, D. (2004) Logic Models: A Useful Tool for Designing, Strengthening and Evaluating Programs to Reduce Adolescent Sexual Risk-Taking, Pregnancy, HIV and Other STDs Resource Center for Adolescent Pregnancy Prevention (ReCapp). ETR Associates.
- Kirby, D. (2002) Antecedents of Adolescent Initiation of Sex, Contraceptive use and Pregnancy. American Journal of Health Behavior, 26(6), 473-485
- Kirby, D. (2001) Understanding what works and what doesn’t in reducing adolescent sexual risk-taking. Family Planning Perspectives, 33(6), 276-281
- Kirby, D. (1997) No Easy Answers: Research Findings on Programs to Reduce Teen Pregnancy. Washington D.C.: The National Campaign to Prevent Teen Pregnancy
- Kirby, D. (1991) School-Based Clinics: Research Results and Their Implications for Future Research Methods. Evaluation and Program Planning, 14, 35-47
- Kirby, Douglas Bernard (1975) An empirical analysis of correlates of international conflict Ph.D. thesis, UCLA Libraries and Collections
