= Journal of Public Health Policy =

- Discipline: Public health
- Language: English
- Edited by: Anthony Robbins, Phyllis Freeman

Publication details
- History: 1980–present
- Publisher: Palgrave Macmillan
- Frequency: Quarterly
- Impact factor: 2.113 (2011)

Standard abbreviations
- ISO 4: J. Public Health Policy

Indexing
- CODEN: JPPODK
- ISSN: 0197-5897 (print); 1745-655X (web)
- LCCN: 80644507
- OCLC no.: 55053767

Links
- Journal homepage; Online access

The Journal of Public Health Policy is a peer-reviewed medical journal established in 1980 by Milton Terris. It covers the field of public health and is the official journal of the National Association for Public Health Policy (NAPHP).

== Abstracting and indexing ==
The journal is abstracted and indexed in CSA Sociological Abstracts, EMBASE, Index Medicus/MEDLINE, PsycINFO, Science Citation Index Expanded, Scopus, and Social Sciences Citation Index. According to the Journal Citation Reports, the journal has a 2011 impact factor of 2.113.
