= Carol Lashof =

American playwright (born 1956)

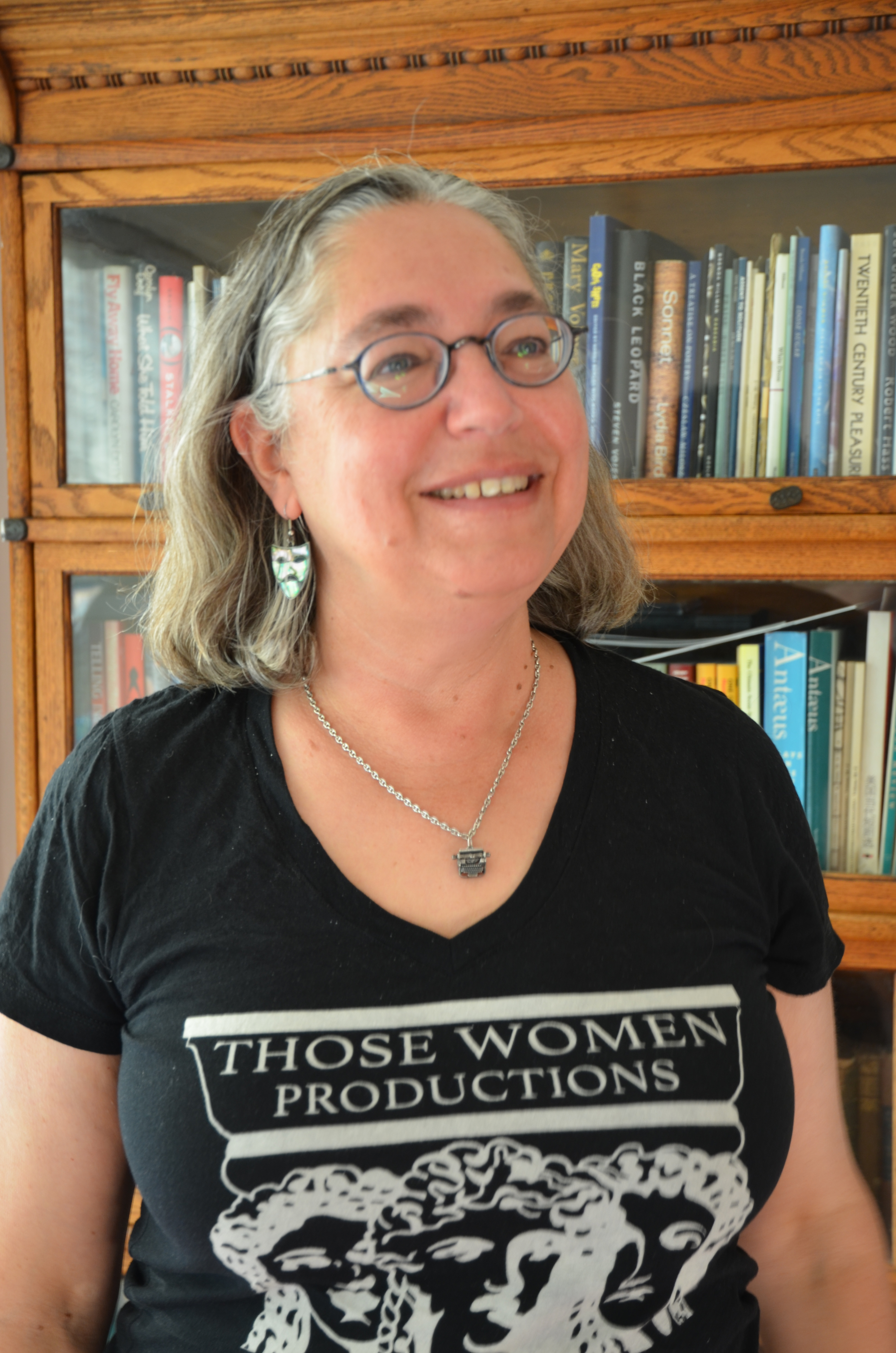
- Carol S. Lashof, Playwright
- Born: 1956 (age 69–70)
- Occupation: playwright

Carol Lashof (born 1956) is an American playwright, educator, and theater producer.

== Early life and education ==
Lashof was born in 1956 to Joyce Lashof and Richard Lashof, one of three siblings. She grew up in the Chicago area. She went to University of Chicago Laboratory Schools, graduating in 1973. She then received a B.A. in literature from UC Santa Barbara's College of Creative Studies in 1976 and a PhD in Modern Thought & Literature from Stanford in 1984. While at Stanford she studied with Martin Esslin and René Girard and wrote her dissertation on D.H. Lawrence and Virginia Woolf. She wrote her first play in 1978.

== Career ==
Lashof is professor emerita at Saint Mary's College of California where she taught in the Department of English from 1983 to 2008 and helped to establish the Creative Writing MFA Program.

Lashof's plays challenge "major myths and stereotypes of western culture," often involving retellings of more classic stories. She explores oppression and patriarchy, often in a classical context. As she describes her motivations, "I am sick of the faithful wife and mother versus the tramp. And I’m sick of the theme of the girl who makes the play for the older professor... and then accuses him of harassment. I’m just sick of these stereotypes." Her one-act drama The Story, a re-telling of Adam and Eve with Eve as the first person created, premiered in a production at The Magic Theatre of San Francisco in1981 https://magictheatre.org/magic-archive, and aired on NPR affiliates nationwide in 1985 and 1986. It was also published in the Kenyon Review https://www.jstor.org/stable/4335116.

Lashof's play Doing School was a semi-finalist for the Bay Area Playwrights Festival in 2020. A scene from the script became the screenplay for Ryan Coogler's award-winning short film Gap which aired on BET. Gap was included in the book One on one: the best men's monologues for the 21st century.

Her play Witch Hunt is a historic drama retelling the events of the 17th century New England witch panic from the viewpoint of Tituba, an enslaved indigenous woman. Her play Medusa's Tale shows Medusa as "an innocent victim who is betrayed, rejected and punished by cruel gods Athena and Poseidon." In 2018 she wrote the play The Melting Pot which was a re-telling of the 1908 play of the same name by Israel Zangwill, using it to reflect current social struggles.

Lashof and Elizabeth "Libby" Vega founded Those Women Productions on International Women's Day in 2014, a theater company in Berkeley, California which has a mission to "explore hidden truths of gender and power." Their productions employ "radical hospitality," audience members pay what they can. The company was together until 2022.

== Honors and awards ==
Lashof received the Joseph Kesselring Award from the National Arts Club of New York in 1981 and the Jane Chambers Competition.

== Personal life ==
Lashof is married to Bill Newton, a retired UC administrator. They have two daughters and live in Berkeley.
