= Terriss =

Terriss is a surname. Notable people with the surname include:

- Ellaline Terriss (1871–1971), English actress and singer
- Tom Terriss (1872–1964), British actor, screenwriter, and film director
- William Terriss (1847–1897), English actor

== See also ==
- Terris (surname)
