= Marion W. Sheahan =

American nurse

Marion Winifred Sheahan
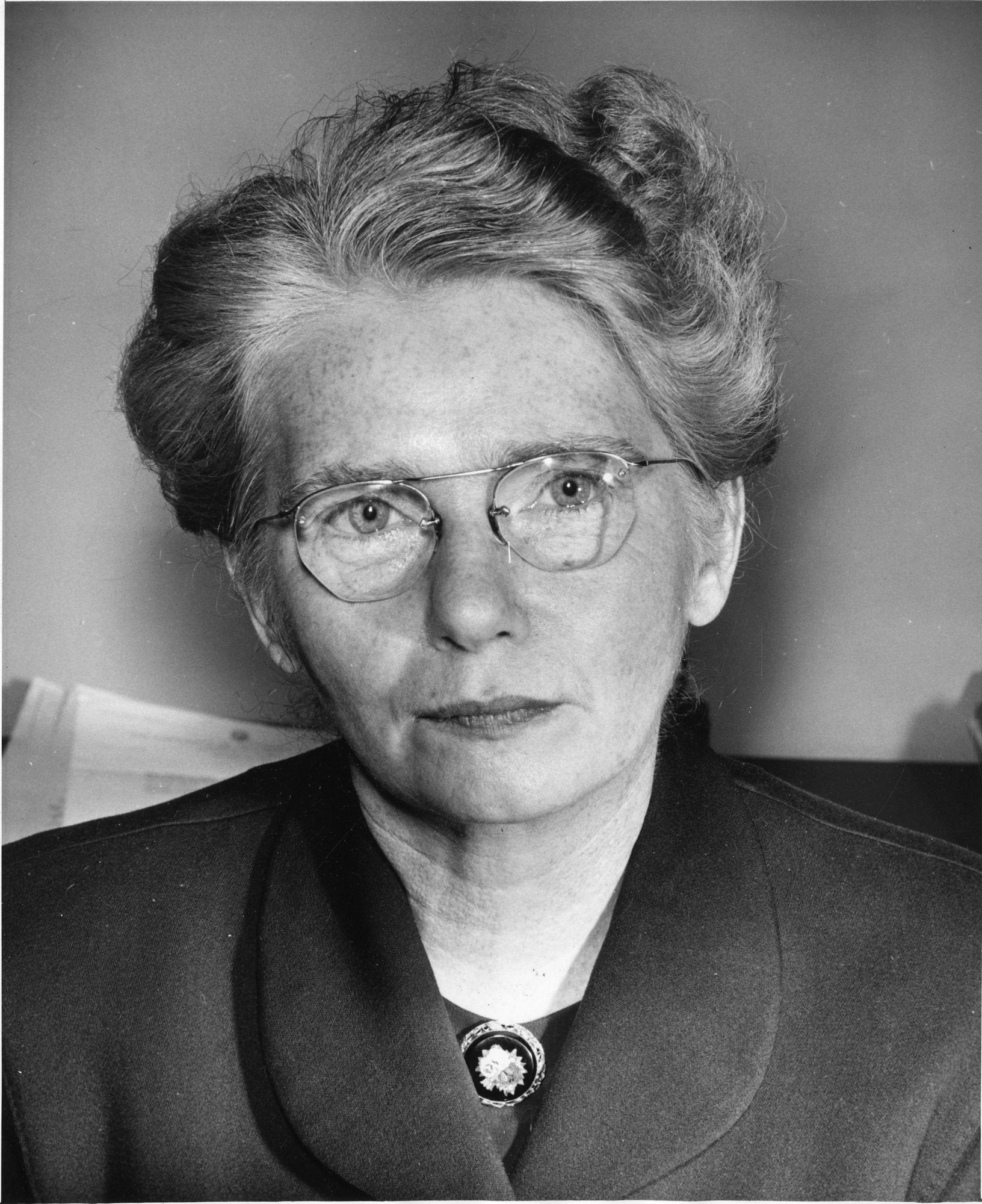
- Born: September 5, 1892; New York City
- Died: March 17, 1994 (aged 101); Albany, New York
- Occupation: public health nurse

ToNoy

Marion Winifred Sheahan (September 5, 1892 – March 17, 1994) was a public health nurse and administrator whose advocacy work helped guide nursing's response to societal changes. Sheahan was Executive Director of the National Committee for the Improvement of Nursing Services and president of the National Organization for Public Health Nursing from 1944-46. She was the first nurse to serve as head of the American Public Health Association (APHA) in 1960.

Sheahan worked for the New York State Department of Health from 1920 through 1948 where she developed a public health nursing organization. She advocated for a patient-centered approach to nursing care. During the Depression she helped ensure that the Temporarily Relief Act included nursing care as a "necessity of life". In 1952, she was one of fifteen people selected by President Truman to be part of The President's Commission on the Health Needs of the Nation. The committee suggested federal funding of educational programs including college-level nursing schools. The committee also addressed health disparities between white and black Americans and made suggestions for reducing these inequalities.

Sheahan received the 1949 Lasker Award and the 1969 Sedgwick Memorial Medal from APHA. She was also honored with the Florence Nightingale Medal from the International Red Cross Societies in 1957 and the Pearl McIver Public Health Nurse Award from the American Nurses Association in 1986.

== Personal life ==
Sheahan was born in New York City to James C. and Catherine Nolan Sheahan. The family moved to Albany, New York in 1901. She graduated from St. Peter's Hospital School of Nursing in Albany in 1913. She married Frank W. Bailey on March 17, 1935. Baily died in 1947.
