= Victor W. Sidel =

American physician

Victor W. Sidel (July 7, 1931 – January 30, 2018) was an American physician and a president of the American Public Health Association. He was a founder and president of Physicians for Social Responsibility and later was co-president of International Physicians for the Prevention of Nuclear War, which was the recipient of the Nobel Peace Prize in 1985.

== Life and career ==
Born in 1931 to Jewish emigrant parents from Ukraine, Sidel was raised in Trenton, New Jersey, and attended Trenton Central High School. As a child he worked in a pharmacy owned by his parents. Sidel studied physics at Princeton University and earned his medical degree from Harvard Medical School. He began residency at Peter Bent Brigham Hospital. After one year, the United States Public Health Service sent Sidel to the National Institutes of Health. While at the NIH, Sidel wrote articles about a congressional hearing regarding a breach of confidentiality. Sidel's writings brought him to the attention of Bernard Lown, who then invited him to cofound Physicians for Social Responsibility in 1961. Sidel returned to Brigham and completed his residency, after which he held two fellowships arranged for him by David D. Rutstein through Massachusetts General Hospital. He then left for Montefiore Medical Center, where he was named Chair of the Department of Social Medicine in 1969.

In the 1970s, Sidel visited both China and Chile to learn about health care reform in both countries. Sidel was also active in International Physicians for the Prevention of Nuclear War, succeeding Bernard Lown as co-president of the body. He later led the American Public Health Association between 1985 and 1986. In these leadership positions, Sidel linked nuclear war to public health, and led demonstrations against nuclear warfare. He was appointed to a distinguished professorship upon stepping down as department chair in 1985, and later accepted a one-year appointment as Cleveringa Professor at the University of Leiden, becoming the first non-lawyer to hold the post. In 1991, Sidel chaired the Technical Advisory Committee of the Food Research and Action Center's Community Childhood Hunger Report. In 1997, he received the Sedgwick Memorial Medal from the American Public Health Association.

A chairman of the 1997 UNESCO Working Group on Chemical and Biological Weapons for Physicians for Human Rights and a co-founder of the American Public Health Association Sidel-Levy Award for Peace, Sidel is the author of numerous books and articles about the human consequences of war, nuclear weapons, international health, and the impact of poverty and deprivation on health and well-being and lectured worldwide on these issues. He said “All human beings have a right to social justice, peace, full employment and humane services. All of us, as human beings, have a duty to fight for changes in control of wealth and power to make this possible."

His wife, Ruth Grossman Sidel, a professor of sociology at Hunter College and author of numerous books and articles about the impact of poverty on women and children, died in 2016.

Sidel died in Greenwood Village, Colorado on January 30, 2018.

== Publications ==
- Levy, Barry S.; Sidel, Victor (1996). War and Public Health. USA: Oxford University Press. ASIN B00ATH59H8.
- Cukier, Wendy; Sidel, Victor (2000). The Global Gun Epidemic: From Saturday Night Specials to AK-47s. USA: Praeger. ISBN 0275982564.
- Levy, Barry S.; Sidel, Victor (2002). Terrorism and Public Health: A Balanced Approach to Strengthening Systems and Protecting People. USA: Oxford University Press. ISBN 0199765545.
- Levy, Barry S.; Sidel, Victor; Wright, Marian (2005). Social Injustice and Public Health. USA: Oxford University Press. ISBN 0195171853.
