= Eugene Lindsay Bishop =

Eugene Lindsay Bishop (1886-1951) was an American physician who served as the Commissioner for the Tennessee State Health Department from 1924-1935 and as the Director of the Health and Safety Department of the Tennessee Valley Authority (TVA) from 1935-1951. He was awarded a Lasker Award in 1950.

Bishop was born in Nashville, Tennessee to Eugene Edgar Bishop (1861-1889) and Elizabeth Lindsay Crittenden Bishop. He received his medical degree from Vanderbilt University in 1914 and his Master of Public Health degree from Johns Hopkins in 1923. Bishop spent almost the entirety of his career serving as a public health official for the state of Tennessee, but was also a consultant to the federal government and a scientific director and board member of the International Health Division of the Rockefeller Foundation. As commissioner, he took a special interest in the problem of tuberculosis.

As health director for the TVA, Bishop sought to reduce the threat of malaria along the 10,000 mile shore line of TVA's lakes, and devised a strategy that involved periodically raising and lowering the water level in each lake. For this innovation he was awarded the Mary Woodard Lasker Award for Public Service in 1950. Bishop died in 1951, less than a year after receiving the award.
