= Lauren Gardner (scientist) =

American epidemiologist

- Born: Lauren Marie Gardner
- Education: University of Texas at Austin
- Scientific career
- Workplaces: University of New South Wales; Johns Hopkins University
- Thesis: Network based prediction models for coupled transportation-epidemiological systems (2011)
- Doctoral students: Ensheng Dong, PhD candidate Hongru Du, PhD candidate Maximilian Marshall, PhD candidate Sonia Jindal, PhD candidate Kristen Nixon, PhD candidate Naomi Rankin, PhD Candidate Samee Saiyed, Research Assistant Andreas Nearchou, Research Assistant
- Website: https://systems.jhu.edu/lauren_gardner/

Lauren Marie Gardner is an American engineer who is an associate professor and co-director of the Center for Systems Science and Engineering at Johns Hopkins University. She created the Johns Hopkins University dashboard that is used to share information about the COVID-19 pandemic.

She is also a member of the Data Science and Artificial Intelligence Institute. She is the creator of the interactive web-based dashboard used by public health authorities, researchers, and the general public around the globe to track the COVID-19 Pandemic. The dashboard debuted on January 22, 2020, and since has recorded more than 200 billion feature requests, which are the number of interactions visitors have with the underlying data available on the site.

Gardner was included in Time's 100 Most Influential People of 2020.

== Early life and education ==
In 2006, Gardner received a B.S.Arch.E. in architectural engineering from the University of Texas at Austin. In 2008, she received an M.S.E. in civil engineering, also from UT-Austin. In 2011, Gardner earned her PhD in Transportation Engineering from the University of Texas at Austin. Her dissertation was on the topic of Network Prediction Models for Coupled Transportation-Epidemiological Systems.

== Research and career ==
In 2011, Gardner was appointed a lecturer at the University of New South Wales (UNSW). She was a member of the UNSW Research Centre for Integrated Transport Innovation. This team coined the phrase "bio-secure mobility" to describe the new line of research pursued by Gardner. In summary, Gardner explores how people and things moving around our globalised world spread infectious disease. Her research considers the relationship between epidemiology and transport, making use of network optimisation to describe the spread of disease.

She looked to avoid pandemics by identifying high-risk shipping and air traffic routes. She worked on a computer model that could help government officials in the United States better assess which passengers are likely to suffer from infectious disease and virus outbreaks, and to help them decide where and when to screen passengers. Her models make use of air travel data, the suitability of habitats to vectors, the local transmission of a virus and passenger air travel data. She used the model to analyse the 2015–16 Zika virus epidemic in the Americas.

During this same time, Gardner was a research fellow with the Australian Government's National Health and Medical Research Council (NHMRC) Centres of Research Excellence (CRE) in Population Health Research at the School of Public Health and Community Medicine at the University of Melbourne.

In 2019, Gardner moved back to United States to work at Johns Hopkins University, where she serves as Associate Professor and Co-Director of the Center for Systems Science and Engineering. Here she has studied the United States counties that are most at risk of measles outbreaks. Her analysis concluded that Los Angeles, King County, Washington and Miami-Dade County, Florida were most likely to suffer a measles outbreak .

During the COVID-19 pandemic, Gardner recognized that the public, researchers and health authorities needed clear, accessible and up-to-date information. Gardner and her first-year graduate student, Ensheng Dong, created an interactive dashboard that debuted on January 22, 2020. During March 2020, the platform was accessed 1.2 billion times per day. In 2020 Gardner briefed the United States Congress on the COVID-19 pandemic in the United States.

Gardner has received research funding from U.S. governmental organizations and philanthropies including NIH, NSF, NASA, the CDC, and Bloomberg Philanthropies. She has published over 100 scholarly articles, letters, communications, and conference proceedings, and supervises a research group of PhD students and post docs. Gardner is an invited member of multiple international professional committees, and reviewer for top-tier journals and grant-funding organizations. She is an invited participant of various scientific advisory committees, including the U.S. Transportation Research Board committees on Network Modeling, Transportation and Health, and Aviation Security and Emergency Management. She has supervised more than 30 students and post-docs, and teaches undergraduate- and graduate-level courses on network modeling and transport systems at Johns Hopkins.

On March 6, 2020, Lauren Gardner, co-director of the CSSE, appeared on Capitol Hill alongside a panel of other Johns Hopkins experts to brief congressional staff and media about the global COVID-19 outbreak.

== Honors & Awards ==
- 2006-2010: Engineering Thrust Fellowship
- 2008, 2009, 2010: Eisenhower Transportation Fellowship
- 2010: Robert Herman Endowed Scholarship
- 2010: WTS Heart of Texas Chapter Scholarship for the Helene M. Overly Memorial Scholarship
- 2012: UNSW Sydney, Staff Excellence Award
- Fast Company Most Creative People in Business for 2020
- 2020: Gardner was on the list of the BBC's 100 Women announced on 23 November 2020.
- 2020 TIME100: TIME's list of the world's most influential people
- 2021 Outstanding Young Texas Exes
- 2022: Lasker-Bloomberg Public Service Award

== Selected works and publications ==
=== Works ===
- Gardner, Lauren Marie (May 2011). Network Based Prediction Models for Coupled Transportation-Epidemiological Systems (PDF) (PhD). University of Texas at Austin. OCLC 728660324.
- Gardner, Lauren M.; Fajardo, David; Waller, S. Travis; Wang, Ophelia; Sarkar, Sahotra (2012). "A Predictive Spatial Model to Quantify the Risk of Air-Travel-Associated Dengue Importation into the United States and Europe". Journal of Tropical Medicine. 2012 103679. doi:10.1155/2012/103679. ISSN 1687-9686. PMC 3317038. PMID 22523497. Wikidata ()
- Gardner, Lauren M.; Duell, Melissa; Waller, S. Travis (March 2013). "A framework for evaluating the role of electric vehicles in transportation network infrastructure under travel demand variability". Transportation Research Part A: Policy and Practice. 49: 76–90. Bibcode:2013TRPA...49...76G. doi:10.1016/j.tra.2013.01.031. ISSN 0965-8564.
- Gardner, Lauren M; Chen, Nan; Sarkar, Sahotra (May 2016). "Global risk of Zika virus depends critically on vector status of Aedes albopictus". The Lancet Infectious Diseases. 16 (5): 522–523. doi:10.1016/s1473-3099(16)00176-6. ISSN 1473-3099. PMID 26997578. Wikidata ()
- Bui, Chau Minh; Gardner, Lauren; MacIntyre, Raina; Sarkar, Sahotra; Sun, Gui-Quan (4 April 2017). "Influenza A H5N1 and H7N9 in China: A spatial risk analysis". PLOS ONE. 12 (4) e0174980. Bibcode:2017PLoSO..1274980B. doi:10.1371/JOURNAL.PONE.0174980. PMC 5380336. PMID 28376125. Wikidata ()
- Dong, Ensheng; Du, Hongru; Gardner, Lauren (February 2020). "An interactive web-based dashboard to track COVID-19 in real time". The Lancet Infectious Diseases. 20 (5): 533–534. doi:10.1016/S1473-3099(20)30120-1. PMC 7159018. PMID 32087114. Wikidata ()

=== Publications ===
- Gardner, Lauren (23 January 2020). "Public Health: Mapping 2019-nCoV". Center for Systems Science and Engineering, Whiting School of Engineering (CSSE), Johns Hopkins.
- Gardner, Lauren (21 February 2024). "A population level study on the determinants of COVID-19 vaccination rates at the U.S. county level". Scientific Reports.
- Gardner, Lauren (28 January 2024). "Simulating Mosquito Habitats as an Element of Climate-informed Disease Forecasting". American Meteorological Society.
- Gardner, Lauren (18 January 2024). "Association between vaccination rates and COVID-19 health outcomes in the United States: a population-level statistical analysis". BMC Public Health. Vol. 24. doi:10.1186/s12889-024-17790-w.
