= Barry S. Levy =

American physician (born 1944)

Barry S. Levy (born 1944) is a physician and former president of the American Public Health Association.

A graduate of Tufts University (B.S., 1966), he holds an M.P.H. (1970) from the Harvard School of Public Health, and completed his M.D. (1971) at Weill Cornell Medicine. He completed his internal medicine residency at University Hospital and the Beth Israel Hospital (now Beth Israel Deaconess Medical Center) in Boston, and a preventive medicine residency at the Centers for Disease Control and Prevention.

He currently is an adjunct professor of public health at Tufts University School of Medicine. He formerly was a medical epidemiologist with the Centers for Disease Control and Prevention, a professor at the University of Massachusetts Chan Medical School, and director of international public health programs. He served in a variety of roles in the American Public Health Association.

With Victor W. Sidel, he edited two editions of each of the following books: War and Public Health, Terrorism and Public Health, and Social Injustice and Public Health. He also edited the two most recent editions of Social Injustice and Public Health. He edited seven editions of Occupational and Environmental Health: Recognizing and Preventing Disease and Injury with David H. Wegman, Sherry L. Baron, and Rosemary K. Sokas. He edited two editions of Preventing Occupational Disease and Injury with James L. Weeks, Gregory R. Wagner, and Kathleen M. Rest. He edited two editions of Climate Change and Public Health with Jonathan A. Patz. He edited Mastering Public Health: Essential Skills for Effective Practice with Joyce R. Gaufin. In 2022, he wrote From Horror to Hope: Recognizing and Preventing the Health Impacts of War. He edited Years of Horror, Days of Hope: Responding to the Cambodian Refugee Crisis with Daniel Susott. He edited International Perspectives in Environment, Development, and Health: Toward a Sustainable World with Gurinder Shahi, Al Binger, Tord Kjellström, and Robert Lawrence.

== Awards ==
- 1998 Duncan Clark Award
- 2005 Sedgwick Memorial Medal
- 2024 Int'l Courage of Conscience Award
- 2024 Special Achievement Award, Weill Cornell Medical College Alumni Association
