= Jonathan Patz =

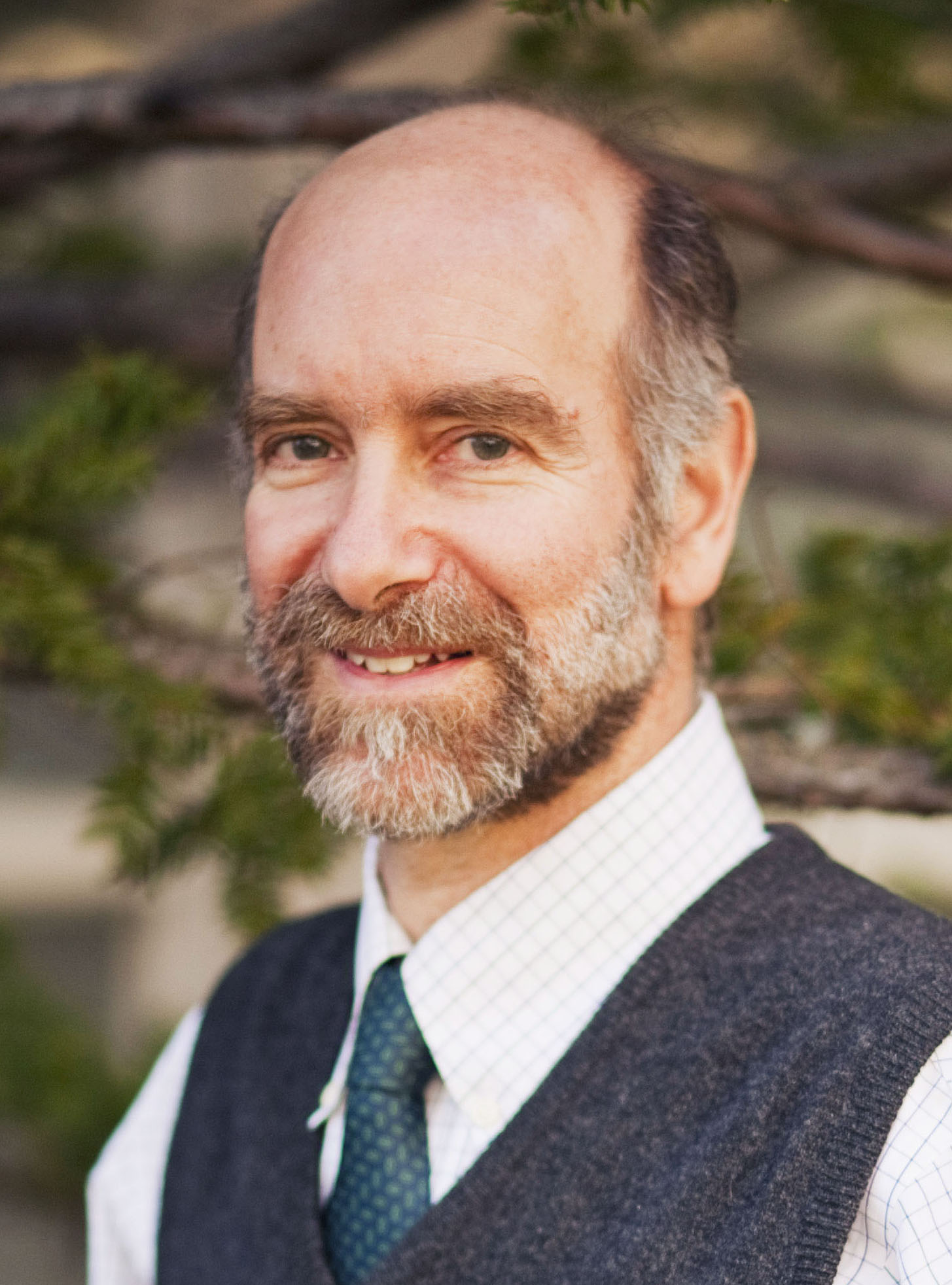
Jonathan Patz, 2013

Jonathan Alan Patz is an American academic who is a professor and John P. Holton Chair of Health and the Environment at the University of Wisconsin-Madison, where he serves as Director of the Global Health Institute. Patz also holds appointments in the Nelson Institute for Environmental Studies and the Department of Population Health Sciences at the UW-Madison. He serves on the executive committee of the Tyler Prize for Environmental Achievement and was elected in 2019 to the National Academy of Medicine.

Patz's research focuses primarily on:global health, public health, global climate change, infectious diseases, urban air pollution, land use change, the built urban environment and transportation planning effects on health—sometimes referred to as health co-benefits of climate change mitigation. His work on co-benefits appeared in Forbes Magazine. In 2017, Rotary International covered Patz's research on climate-health impacts. His research has focused on geographic regions in Africa, Amazonia, and the United States.

== Early life and education ==
Patz was born in Baltimore, Maryland. He attended the Baltimore Friends School, a private Quaker coeducational school for students in pre-kindergarten through grade 12. He attended Colorado College, receiving a B.A. in biology in 1980. Patz received a medical degree in 1987 from Case Western Reserve University School of Medicine and completed a residency in family medicine at the Medical University of South Carolina in 1990. In 1992, he completed a master's degree in public health at the Johns Hopkins Bloomberg School of Hygiene and Public Health. He then completed an environmental and occupational medicine residency at Johns Hopkins in 1994, becoming certified by the American Board of Occupational and Environmental Medicine in 1997.

== Career ==
Patz was a family medicine clinician in Missoula, Montana, and Baltimore, Maryland, from 1990 to 1994. In 1994, he became a full-time researcher at Johns Hopkins Bloomberg School of Public Health in the Department of Environmental Health Sciences.

In 2004, Patz joined the University of Wisconsin-Madison as an associate professor of the Nelson Institute for Environmental Studies and the Department of Population Health Sciences. In 2008 he became a full professor and a faculty affiliate of the Robert M. La Follette School of Public Affairs. In 2011 Patz was appointed to serve as the inaugural director of University of Wisconsin-Madison's campus-wide Global Health Institute. Patz has fostered partnerships between the Global Health Institute and the UW Energy Institute, the Nelson Institute for Environmental Studies, and the campus's Office of Sustainability.

Patz has designed environmental health courses around the theme, "Health Impact Assessment of Global Environmental Change". He has taught WHO workshops on global environmental health. He directs a "Certificate in Humans and the Global Environment," that emerged from his directing (as Principal Investigator) a National Science Foundation (NSF) Integrated Graduate Education and Research Traineeship (IGERT) award. He developed and taught a MOOC (Massive Open Online Course) on Climate Change Policy and Public Health in November 2015.

== Research ==
Patz and his research team focus on the nexus of climate change and health. He served as principal investigator for an EPA STAR grant in 1996 entitled, "Integrated Assessment of the Public Health Effects of Climate Change for the US and US territories", one of the first federal grants awarded on this subject. Scientific discoveries under his team leadership on this and subsequent projects include: the impact of climate change on increased risk for asthma; the relationship between heat wave mortality and latitude, and identifying populations most vulnerable to heat-related morbidity; the association of hantavirus outbreaks with El Niño in the southwestern United States; the relationship between waterborne disease outbreaks across the U.S. and heavy rainfall events; the link between South American cholera outbreaks and childhood diarrheal diseases to El Niño; altered mosquito-borne malaria and dengue fever risks from projected climate change; and increased malaria risk from combined land use and local climatic change in the Amazon Basin. His team's recent research has targeted and substantially contributed to a new area of climate change and health assessment: "co-benefits" of greenhouse gas mitigation policies.

== Publications and presentations ==
Patz has published 188 research items. His peer-reviewed scientific publications have appeared in journals such as Nature, Science, PNAS, The Lancet, JAMA, American Journal of Public Health, Journal of Emerging Infectious Diseases, and Environmental Health Perspectives and focus on publicizing the public health effects of climate change.

In 1997, Patz organized and led the first briefing on climate change and health to then EPA Administrator Carol Browner on why climate change matters to public safety. In 1998, he served as co-chair of the Health Expert Panel for the first U.S. National Assessment on Climate Variability and Change. He served as founding president of the International Association for Ecology and Health from 2006 to 2010, convening scientists and professionals around health crises stemming from global climate and ecological change. Patz has testified on climate change and health in both houses of Congress, state legislatures, and has given invited presentations to the National Academy of Sciences (NAS). He has served on five scientific committees of the NAS, and on a committee of the Presidential Council of Advisors on Science and Technology (PCAST). He has also served on science advisory and FACA committees for several federal agencies. He was invited on two occasions to brief the Dalai Lama on the inequities posed by climate change.

In September 2015, Patz addressed the Physicians for Social Responsibility’s Climate Health Summit to inform participants about the health implications of climate change. He also delivered a keynote presentation at the University of Geneva in February 2015. His most recently published book, Climate Change and Public Health, co-authored with Barry S. Levy, further describes the implications of climate change with a focus on the adverse public health effects.

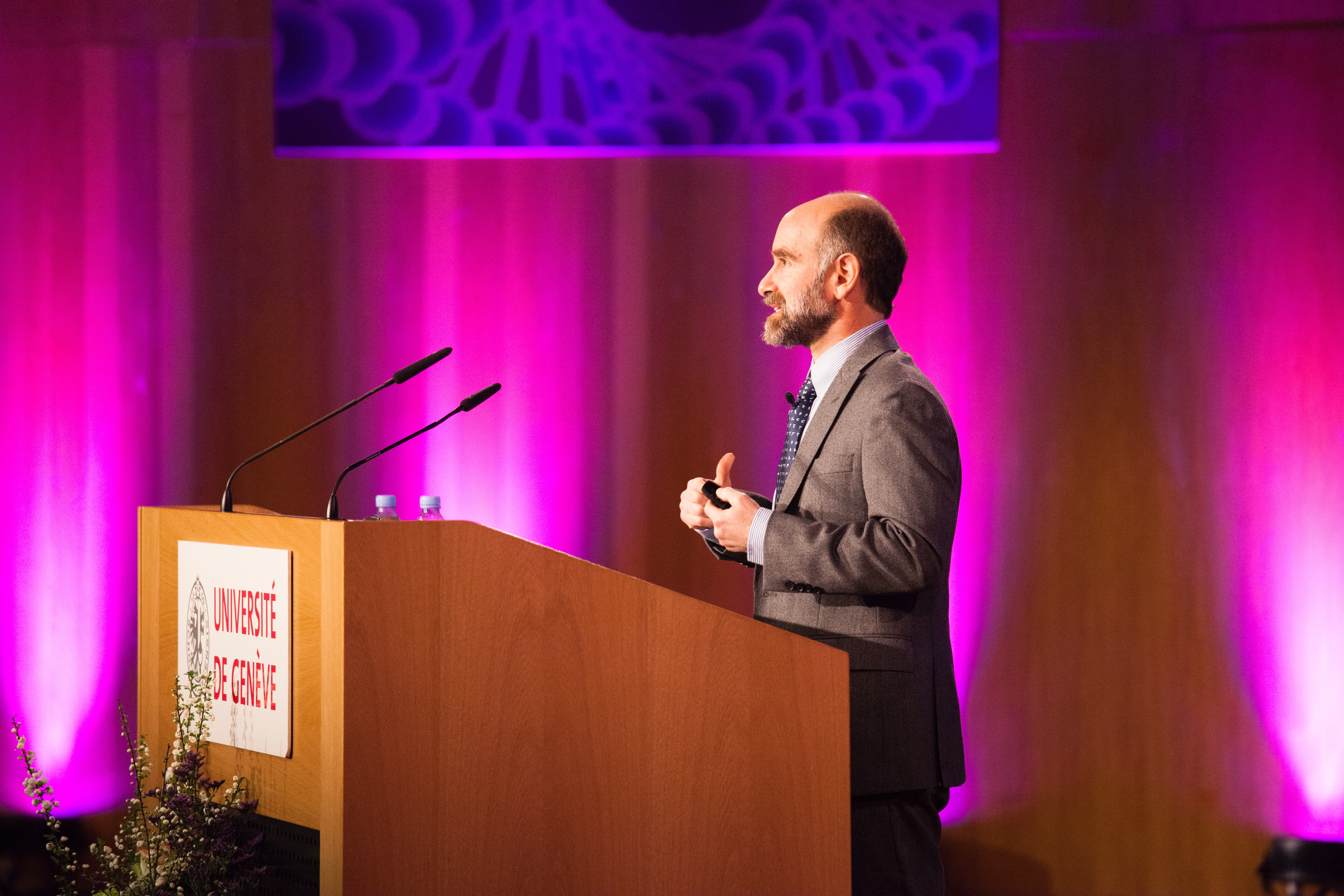
Jonathan Patz presents to students at the University of Geneva in February 2015

=== Selected journal articles ===
- Curriero FC, Patz JA (Corresponding Author), Rose JB, Lele S. "Analysis of the association between extreme precipitation and waterborne disease outbreaks in the United States, 1948-1994." American Journal of Public Health 2001 (Aug) 91:1194-99.
- Glass, GE, Yates TL, Fine FB, Shields TM, Kendall JB, Hope AG, Parmenter CA, Peters CJ, Ksiazek TG, Li CS, Patz JA, Mills JN. "Satellite imagery characteristics local animal reservoir populations of Sin Monbre virus in the southwestern United States." Proceedings of the National Academy of Sciences 2002;99:16817-16822.
- Patz JA, Hulme M, Rosenzweig C, Mitchell TD, Goldberg RA, Githeko AK, Lele S, McMichael AJ, Le Sueur D. "Regional warming and malaria resurgence." Nature 2002;420:627-628.
- Patz JA, Campbell-Lendrum D, Holloway T, Foley, JA. "Impact of regional climate change on human health." Nature (cover) (2005);438: 310–317.
- Patz JA, Gibbs, HK, Foley JA, Rogers JV, Smith KR. "Climate Change and Global Health: Quantifying a Growing Ethical Crisis." EcoHealth 2007 4(4): 397–405.
- Patz JA, Vavrus S, Uejio C, McClellan S. "Climate Change and Waterborne Disease Risk in the Great Lakes Region of the US." American Journal of Preventive Medicine 2008;35(5):451–458.
- Vittor AY, Pan W, Gilman RH, Tielsch J, Glass GE, Shields T, Sanchez Lozano, W, Pinedo VV, Patz JA. "Linking deforestation to malaria in the Amazon: Characterization of the breeding habitat of the principal malaria vector, Anopheles darling." American Journal of Tropical Medicine and Hygiene 2009; 81(1):5-12.
- Olson SH, Gangnon R, Silveira G, Patz JA. "Deforestation links to malaria in Mancio Lima County, Brazil." Journal of Emerging Infectious Diseases 16 (7) 2010:1108-1115.
- Li B, Sain S, Mearns LO, Anderson HA, Kovats RS, Ebi KL, Patz JA. "The impact of heat waves on morbidity in Milwaukee, Wisconsin." Climatic Change, 2011; DOI 10.1007/s10584-011-0120-y
- Grabow ML, Spak SN, Holloway TA, Stone B, Mednick AC, Patz JA. "Air quality and exercise-related health benefits from reduced car travel in the Midwestern United States." Environmental Health Perspectives 2011; 120:68-76.
- Patz JA and Hahn MB. "Climate change and health: A One Health Approach." Current Topics in Microbiology and Immunology. November 2012. DOI: 10.1007/82_2012_274
- Hahn MB, Olson S Vittor A, Barcellos C, Patz JA, Pan, W. "Conservation Efforts and Malaria in the Brazilian Amazon." American Journal of Tropical Medicine 2013.
- Patz JA, Frumkin H, Holloway T. Vimont DJ, Haines A. "Climate change: challenges and opportunities for Global Health." Journal of the American Medical Association. 2014;312(15): 1565–1580.
- Patz JA, Grabow ML, Limaye VS. "When is rains, it pours: future climate extremes and health." Annals of Global Health, October 2014.
- Goldberg T and Patz JA. "The need for a global health ethic (Comment)". The Lancet, July 16, 2015 http://dx.doi.org/10.1016/S0140-6736(15)60757-7
- Levy BS and Patz JA. "Climate change, human rights and social justice". Annals of Global Health, 2015; 81 (3); 310–322. http://doi.org/10.1016/j.aogh.2015.08.008
- Patz JA. "Solving the global climate crisis: the greatest health opportunity of our times?" Public Health Reviews. https://doi.org/10.1186/s40985-016-0047-y
- Abel D, Holloway T, Kladar RM, Meier P, Ahl D, Harkey M, Schuetter S, Patz J. "Response of Power Plant Emissions to Ambient Temperature in the Eastern United States". Environmental Science and Technology (2017). http://dx.doi.org/10.1021/acs.est.6b0620
- Meier P, Holloway T, Patz J, Harkey M, Ahl D, Scott Schuetter S, Hackel S. "Impact of warmer weather on emissions due to building energy use". Environmental Research Letters; 2017; 12: 064014. https://doi.org/10.1088/1748-9326/aa6f64
- Abel DW, Holloway T, Harkey M, Meier P, Ahl D, Limaye VS, Patz JA. (2018) "Air-quality-related health impacts from climate change and from adaptation of cooling demand for buildings in the eastern United States: An interdisciplinary modeling study". PLoS Med 15(7): e1002599. https://doi.org/10.1371/journal.pmed.1002599 [4 citations, 1-3-2019]
- Limaye VS, Vargo J, Harkey M, Holloway T, Patz JA. (2018) "Climate Change and Heat-Related Excess Mortality in the Eastern USA". EcoHealth, August, 2018, https://doi.org/10.1007/s10393-018-1363-0
- Patz JA and West JJ. "The Paris Agreement could save lives in China". Lancet Planetary Health 2018; April:2(4):147-148. http://dx.doi.org/10.1016/S2542-5196(18)30052-4
- Sippy R, Herrera D, Gaus D, Gangnon R, Osorio J, and Patz J. "Seasonality of Dengue Fever in Rural Ecuador: 2009-2016". PLOS NTDs, December 2018. http://dx.doi.org/10.1101/452318
- Stull VJ, Finer E, Bergmans R, Febvre H, Patz JA, Weir TL. "Impact of Edible Cricket Consumption on Gut Microbiota in Healthy Adults, a Double-blind, Randomized Crossover Trial". Scientific Reports 2018. http://dx.doi.org/10.1038/s41598-018-29032-2
- Stull V and Patz J. "Research and Policy Priorities for Edible Insects" (2019). Sustainability Science https://doi.org/10.1007/s11625-019-00709-5
- Stull VJ, Kersten M, Bergmans RS, Patz JA, Paskewitz S. (in press) "Crude Protein, Amino Acid, and Iron Content of Tenebrio molitor Reared on an Agricultural Byproduct from Maize Production: an Exploratory Study". Annals of the Entomological Society of America.

== Awards ==
- Homer Calver Award for Leadership in Environmental Health, American Public Health Association, 2015
