= Richard Lashof =

American mathematician

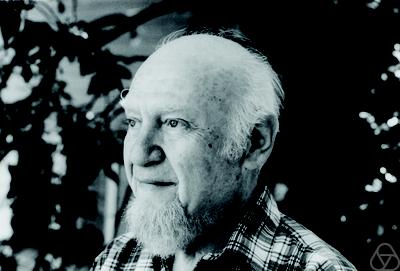
- Born: November 9, 1922; Philadelphia, Pennsylvania
- Died: February 4, 2010 (aged 87); Alameda, California
- Education: Columbia (Ph.D. 1954); Pennsylvania (B.Sc. 1943)
- Known for: Chern-Lashof theory
- Scientific career
- Fields: Mathematics
- Workplaces: University of Chicago
- Doctoral advisor: Richard Kadison
- Doctoral students: John Smillie; Robert Stong

Richard K. Lashof (November 9, 1922 – February 4, 2010) was an American mathematician. He contributed to the field of geometric and differential topology, working with Shiing-Shen Chern, Stephen Smale, among others. Lashof was regarded as "the key figure in sustaining the Chicago Mathematics Department as an international center for research and the training of topologists" by Melvin Rothenberg. He received the Quantrell Award.

Born in Philadelphia, Pennsylvania, Lashof earned a Bachelor of Science degree in chemical engineering from the University of Pennsylvania in 1943 and was a communications officer in the United States Navy from 1943 to 1946. He earned his doctoral degree in mathematics from Columbia University in 1954 under the supervision of Richard Vincent Kadison. In 1971 he was an invited to speak at the International Congress of Mathematicians in Nice.

== Personal life and death ==
Lashof was married to Joyce Lashof, a physician, and had three children, Judith, who died in 2018, Carol, and Dan.

Lashof died of heart failure on February 4, 2010, after a long illness. He was 87.
