= Joyce C. Lashof =

American physician (1926–2022)

Joyce Cohen Lashof (March 27, 1926 in Philadelphia – June 4, 2022) was an American physician, public health expert and advocate for health equity. She was the first woman to head a state public health department and the first woman to serve as dean of the School of Public Health at the University of California, Berkeley.

== Early life and education ==
Lashof graduated from Duke University in 1946, followed by the Woman's Medical College of Pennsylvania. She completed her residency in internal medicine at Montefiore Hospital.

== Career ==
Lashof was hired as assistant professor in the department of medicine at the University of Chicago and received a series of 1-year contracts. When she asked for a standard 3-year appointment, the department chair told her that “he would never give a married woman a tenured track appointment because she would leave and go where her husband's career took him”.

Lashof joined the department of preventive medicine at the University of Illinois College of Medicine. Lashof was director of the Mile Square Health Center in Chicago, which serves disadvantaged communities, from 1967 to 1971. She went on to become director of community medicine at Presbyterian-St. Luke’s Hospital in Chicago. In 1973, she became the first woman to be director of the State of Illinois Public Health Department. In 1977 she was appointed deputy assistant secretary for health at the Department of Health, Education, and Welfare in Washington, D.C. In 1981 she was appointed dean of the school of public health at the University of California, Berkeley.

In 1995, she received the Sedgwick Memorial Medal.

== Personal life and death ==
Lashof was married to Richard Lashof, a math professor at the University of Chicago and had three children, Judith, who died in 2018, Carol, and Dan.

Lashof died of heart failure on June 4, 2022 in Berkeley, aged 96 years.
