= PRECEDE–PROCEED model =

Proposed cost–benefit framework

The PRECEDE–PROCEED model is a cost–benefit evaluation framework proposed in 1974 by Lawrence W. Green that can help health program planners, policy makers and other evaluators, analyze situations and design health programs efficiently. It provides a comprehensive structure for assessing health and quality of life needs, and for designing, implementing and evaluating health promotion and other public health programs to meet those needs. One purpose and guiding principle of the PRECEDE–PROCEED model is to direct initial attention to outcomes, rather than inputs. It guides planners through a process that starts with desired outcomes and then works backwards in the causal chain to identify a mix of strategies for achieving those objectives. A fundamental assumption of the model is the active participation of its intended audience — that is, that the participants ("consumers") will take an active part in defining their own problems, has establishing their goals and developing their solutions.

In this framework, health behavior is regarded as being influenced by both individual and environmental factors, and hence has two distinct parts. First is an "educational diagnosis" – PRECEDE, an acronym for Predisposing, Reinforcing and Enabling Constructs in Educational Diagnosis and Evaluation. Second is an "ecological diagnosis" – PROCEED, for Policy, Regulatory, and Organizational Constructs in Educational and Environmental Development. The model is multidimensional and is founded in the social/behavioral sciences, epidemiology, administration, and education. The systematic use of the framework in a series of clinical and field trials confirmed the utility and predictive validity of the model as a planning tool.

== Brief history and purpose ==
The PRECEDE framework was first developed and introduced in the 1970s by Green and colleagues. PRECEDE is based on the premise that, just as a medical diagnosis precedes a treatment plan, an educational diagnosis of the problem is very essential before developing and implementing the intervention plan. Predisposing factors include knowledge, attitudes, beliefs, personal preferences, existing skills, and self-efficacy towards the desired behavior change. Reinforcing factors include factors that reward or reinforce the desired behavior change, including social support, economic rewards, and changing social norms. Enabling factors are skills or physical factors such as availability and accessibility of resources, or services that facilitate achievement of motivation to change behavior. The model has led to more than 1000 published studies, applications and commentaries on the model in the professional and scientific literature.

In the early 1990s the National Center for Chronic Disease Prevention and Health Promotion at the Centers for Disease Control and Prevention (CDC, US Department of Health and Human Services) gave additional national prominence to the PRECEDE model. Dr. Marshall Kreuter, Director of the Division of Chronic Disease Control and Community Intervention and his staff adapted and incorporated PRECEDE within a model planning process offered, with federal technical assistance, to state and local health departments to plan and evaluate health promotion programs (with their coalitions). The CDC model was called PATCH, for Planned Approach to Community Health. The relevance of this initiative to the application of PRECEDE, and the inspiration for some of the extensions of the (PATCH) model to incorporate PROCEED dimensions was detailed in a special issue of the Journal of Health Education in 1992.

In 1991, "PROCEED" was added to the framework in consideration of the growing recognition of the expansion of health education to encompass policy, regulatory and related ecological/environmental factors, in determining health and health behaviors. As health-related behaviors, such as smoking and excessive use of alcohol, increased or became more resistant to change, so did the recognition that these behaviors are influenced by factors such as the media, politics, and businesses, which are outside the direct control of the individuals. Hence more "ecological" methods were needed to identify and influence these environmental and social determinants of health behaviors. With the emergence of and rapid growth in the field of genetics, the PRECEDE–PROCEED model was revised, in 2005, to include and address the growing knowledge in this field.

== Description ==
The PRECEDE–PROCEED planning model consists of four planning phases, one implementation phase, and three evaluation phases.

PRECEDE phases	PROCEED phases
Phase 1 – Social Diagnosis	Phase 5 – Implementation
Phase 2 – Epidemiological, Behavioral & Environmental Diagnosis	Phase 6 – Process Evaluation
Phase 3 – Educational & Ecological Diagnosis	Phase 7 – Impact Evaluation
Phase 4 – Administrative & Policy Diagnosis	Phase 8 – Outcome Evaluation

=== Phase 1 – Social diagnosis ===
The first stage in the program planning phase deals with identifying and evaluating the social problems that affect the quality of life of a population of interest. Social assessment is the "application, through broad participation, of multiple sources of information, both objective and subjective, designed to expand the mutual understanding of people regarding their aspirations for the common good". During this stage, the program planners try to gain an understanding of the social problems that affect the quality of life of the community and its members, their strengths, weaknesses, and resources; and their readiness to change. This is done through various activities such as developing a planning committee, holding community forums, and conducting focus groups, surveys, and/or interviews. These activities will engage the beneficiaries in the planning process and planners will be able to see the issues just as the community sees them.

=== Phase 2 – Epidemiological, behavioral, and environmental diagnosis ===
Epidemiological diagnosis deals with determining and focusing on specific health issue(s) of the community, and the behavioral and environmental factors related to prioritized health needs of the community. Based on these priorities, achievable program goals and objectives for the program being developed are established. Epidemiological assessment may include secondary data analysis or original data collection — examples of epidemiological data include vital statistics, state and national health surveys, medical and administrative records, etc. Genetic factors, although not directly changeable through a health promotion program, are becoming increasingly important in understanding health problems and counseling people with genetic risks, or may be useful in identifying high-risk groups for intervention.

Behavioral diagnosis — This is the analysis of behavioral links to the goals or problems that are identified in the social or epidemiological diagnosis. The behavioral ascertainment of a health issue is understood, firstly, through those behaviors that exemplify the severity of the disease (e.g tobacco use among teenagers); secondly, through the behavior of the individuals who directly affect the individual at risk (e.g. parents of teenagers who keep cigarettes at home); and thirdly, through the actions of the decision-makers that affects the environment of the individuals at risk (e.g. law enforcement actions that restrict teens' access to cigarettes). Once behavioral diagnosis is completed for each health problem identified, the planner is able to develop more specific and effective interventions.

Environmental diagnosis — This is a parallel analysis of social and physical environmental factors other than specific actions that could be linked to behaviors. In this assessment, environmental factors beyond the control of the individual are modified to influence the health outcome. For example, poor nutritional status among children may be due to the availability of unhealthful foods in school. This may require not only educational interventions, but also additional strategies such as influencing the behaviors of a school's food service managers

=== Phase 3 – Educational and ecological diagnosis ===
Once the behavioral and environmental factors are identified and interventions selected, planners can start to work on selecting factors that, if modified, will most likely result in behavior change, as well as sustain it. These factors are classified as 1) predisposing, 2) enabling, and 3) reinforcing factors.

Predisposing factors are any characteristics of a person or population that motivate behavior prior to or during the occurrence of that behavior. They include an individual's knowledge, beliefs, values, and attitudes.

Enabling factors are those characteristics of the environment that facilitate action and any skill or resource required to attain specific behavior. They include programs, services, availability and accessibility of resources, or new skills required to enable behavior change.

Reinforcing factors are rewards or punishments following or anticipated as a consequence of a behavior. They serve to strengthen the motivation for a behavior. Some of the reinforcing factors include social support, peer support, etc.

=== Phase 4 – Administrative and policy diagnosis ===
This phase focuses on the administrative and organizational concerns that must be addressed prior to program implementation. This includes assessment of resources, development and allocation of budgets, looking at organizational barriers, and coordination of the program with other departments, including external organizations and the community.

Administrative diagnosis assesses policies, resources, circumstances and prevailing organizational situations that could hinder or facilitate the development of the health program.

Policy diagnosis assesses the compatibility of program goals and objectives with those of the organization and its administration. This evaluates whether program goals fit into the mission statements, rules and regulations that are needed for the implementation and sustainability of the program.

=== Phase 6 – Process evaluation ===
This phase is used to evaluate the process by which the program is being implemented. This phase determines whether the program is being implemented according to the protocol, and determines whether the objectives of the program are being met. It also helps identify modifications that may be needed to improve the program.

=== Phase 7 – Impact evaluation ===
This phase measures the effectiveness of the program with regards to the intermediate objectives as well as the changes in predisposing, enabling, and reinforcing factors. Often this phase is used to evaluate the performance of educators.

=== Phase 8 – Outcome evaluation ===
This phase measures change in terms of overall objectives as well as changes in health and social benefits or quality of life. That is, it determines the effect of the program in the health and quality of life of the community.

== Conclusion ==
The PRECEDE–PROCEED model is a participatory model for creating successful community health promotion and other public health interventions. It is based on the premise that behavior change is by and large voluntary, and that health programs are more likely to be effective if they are planned and evaluated with the active participation of those who will implement them, and those who are affected by them. Thus, it looks at health and other issues within the context of the community. Interventions designed for behavior change to prevent injuries and violence, to improve heart health, and to improve and increase scholarly productivity among health education faculty, are among more than 1000 published applications developed or evaluated using the PRECEDE–PROCEED model as a guideline.

== Bibliography ==
- Green, L.W., Kreuter, M.W., Deeds, S.G., Partridge, K.B. (1980). Health Education Planning: A Diagnostic Approach. 1st edition. Mountain View, California: Mayfield.

- The first edition where the model was introduced and presented as a planning model for health education programs in various settings and where term PRECEDE first appeared.

- Green L, Kreuter M. (1991). Health promotion planning: An educational and environmental approach. 2nd edition. Mountain View, CA: Mayfield Publishing Company

- The second edition of the book where the model's application was expanded from PRECEDE to PROCEED with the addition of the policy, regulatory, and organizational aspects of planning for environmental changes that took health promotion beyond a narrower understanding of health education

- Green L, Kreuter M. (1999). Health promotion planning: An educational and ecological approach. 3rd edition. Mountain View, CA: Mayfield Publishing Company

- The third edition strengthened the ecological approach reflected in the social-environmental aspects that were increasingly relevant to the emerging infectious diseases and problems of lifestyle and social conditions surrounding the increasing prevalence of chronic diseases

- Green L, Kreuter M. (2005). Health program planning: An educational and ecological approach. 4th edition. New York, NY: McGraw Hill.

- A 2002/2003 IOM report on the Future of the Public's Health in the 21st Century urged more expanded application and teaching of ecological and participatory approaches in public health, which are the two cornerstones of the "educational and ecological approach" of PRECEDE–PROCEED planning. This latest edition sought to respond to the challenges of the IOM report and expand the scope of this PRECEDE–PROCEED model as an educational and ecological approach to broader public health and population health planning.
- With recent advances in the genetic field and the increasing attention public health is giving to genetic factors, another significant addition was the inclusion of a specific place for genetic factors, alongside the environmental and behavioral determinants of health.

== See also ==
- Social marketing
- Ecological model
- Health promotion
