= National Association for Public Health Policy =

The National Association for Public Health Policy (NAPHP) was founded in 1980 by a group of past-presidents of the American Public Health Association led by Milton Terris. The purpose of the Association is “to improve the health of the people of the United States by helping to develop health policy, formulating and initiating legislation to implement such policy, and supporting measures to strengthen the public health services.” It sponsors the Journal of Public Health Policy and the online journal NAPHP.ORG.

The National Association of Public Health Policy has issued policy statements to influence national health policy and the health of the people of the United States. It has pursued a program of national policy founded on the three pillars of disease prevention, adequate living standards, and quality medical care for all. By proposing guidelines for leaders at the national, state, and local level, the Association promotes a progressive agenda aimed at improving the living standards, health, and welfare of all Americans, while preserving fundamental individual rights of privacy and self-determination.

Famed epidemiologist Milton Terris served as President of NAPHP until 1993, when he was succeeded by *labor leader and insurance executive Terence E. Carroll who continues in that office. The executive offices of NAPHP are located in Reston, Virginia.
