= Association of University Centers on Disabilities =

United States schools associations

- Abbreviation: AUCD
- Formation: 1963; 63 years ago
- Location: Wayne Ave # 1100, Silver Spring, MD 20910
- Coordinates: 38.994339°N 77.028513°W
- Website: www.aucd.org

The Association of University Centers on Disabilities (AUCD) is an American institution that operates in the disability field, instituted after the Community Mental Health Act of 1963.

== Overview ==
AUCD is a network that represents 67 University Centers for Excellence in Developmental Disabilities (UCEDD) in every state and territory in the United States. AUCD has also established 43 Maternal and Child Health (MCH), Leadership Education in Neurodevelopmental and Related Disabilities (LEND) programs, and 15 Eunice Kennedy Shriver Intellectual and Developmental Disabilities Research Centers (IDDRC).

== Legislation ==
On July 26, 1990, due to the efforts of the AUCD and the Institute for Disability Studies (ILS) the Americans with Disabilities Act (ADA) in to law.
