= Milton Terris =

Public health physician and epidemiologist (1915–2002)

- Born: April 22, 1915; New York City, New York
- Died: October 3, 2002 (aged 87); South Burmington, Vermont
- Education: Columbia University, New York University School of Medicine, Johns Hopkins Bloomberg School of Public Health
- Known for: Advocate for preventive health care, alcohol epidemiology
- Spouse: Lillian Dick Terris
- Awards: Abraham Lilienfeld Award from the American College of Epidemiology, Sedgwick Memorial Award from the American Public Health Association, Duncan Clark Award from the Association of Teachers of Preventive Medicine
- Scientific career
- Fields: Epidemiology
- Workplaces: University of Buffalo School of Medicine, Tulane University, New York City Public Health Research Institute, New York Medical College

Milton Terris (April 22, 1915 – October 3, 2002) was an American public health physician and epidemiologist. He graduated from Columbia University in 1935 and completed his MD at the New York University School of Medicine in 1939 and his MPH from Johns Hopkins University in 1944. He was associate professor of preventive medicine at the State University of New York at Buffalo from 1951 through 1957, and was professor of epidemiology at Tulane University from 1958 through 1960. He was head of the Chronic Disease Unit of the New York City Public Health Research Institute from 1960 through 1963. In 1964, he became professor and chair of the department of preventive medicine at New York Medical College, serving in that role until his retirement in 1980.

He was president of the American Public Health Association from 1966 through 1967. In 1967, he co-founded the Society for Epidemiologic Research, a learned society for epidemiologists, and served as its first president. After retirement, he founded the Journal of Public Health Policy in 1980 and served as its editor until his death in 2002. He joined with several other past presidents of APHA in 1980 to found the National Association for Public Health Policy and served as president of that organization until 1993.
