= American Public Health Association =

Washington, D.C.-based professional organization

- Abbreviation: APHA
- Formation: 1872; 154 years ago
- Founder: Dr. Stephen Smith
- Founded at: New York City
- Purpose: Improve the health of the public and achieve equity in health status
- Headquarters: Washington, D.C.
- Members: 50,000
- Executive director: Georges C. Benjamin, MD, FACP, FACEP (E)
- Staff: 60
- Website: www.apha.org

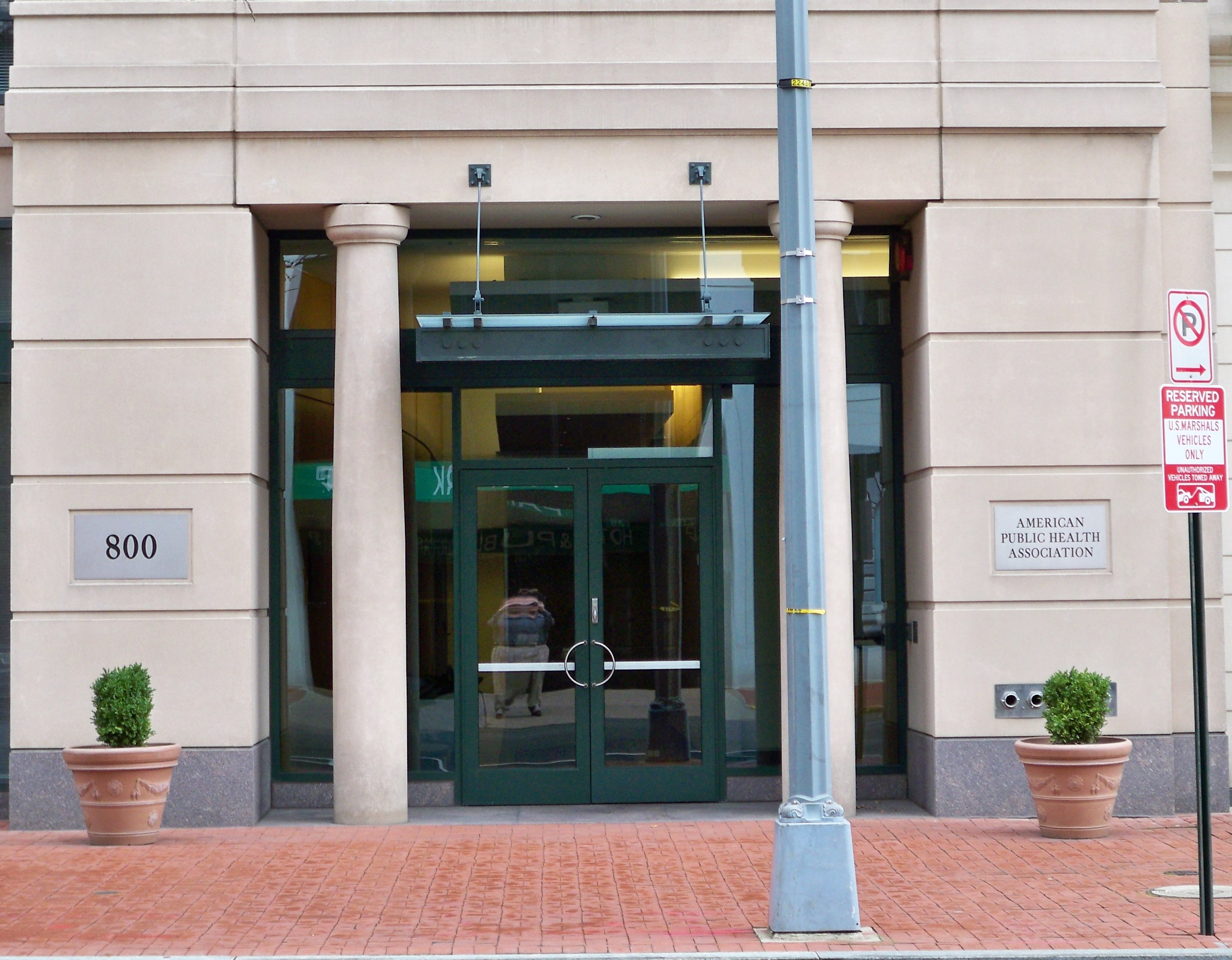
Washington, D.C. office of the APHA

The American Public Health Association (APHA) is a Washington, D.C.–based professional membership and advocacy organization for public health professionals in the United States. APHA is the largest professional organization of public health professionals in the United States and hosts the largest gathering of public health professionals in the world at their annual meeting and exhibition. The organization focuses on a wide range of public health issues with programming related to academics, policy, capacity building, and advocacy.

== History ==
In 1872, APHA was founded by a group of physicians, including Stephen Smith and Henry Hartshorne. APHA has been involved in every major significant public health program of the last 150 years. A list of major milestones can be found on their website, completed in celebration of their 150th anniversary.

== Description ==
APHA has more than 25,000 members worldwide. The association defines itself as an organization that: "champions the health of all people and all communities. We strengthen the public health profession. We speak out for public health issues and policies backed by science. We are the only organization that combines a 150-plus year perspective, a broad-based member community and the ability to influence federal policy to improve the public's health." It defines its mission as: "Improve the health of the public and achieve equity in health status."

Members are organized into sections, special interest groups, affiliates, forums, and caucuses. Sections are the primary organizing units in APHA composed of individuals with shared interest in topics, practice areas, or conditions. Affiliates are state-based public health associations which are separate legal entities from APHA but collaborate closely with each having a representative on APHA's Governing Council. Forums are cross-organization bodies around an interdisciplinary health topic. Special interest groups are groups organizing around a shared interest with the goal of becoming a section. Caucuses are outside professional organizations that are organized around social issues or populations in official relation with APHA.

== Governance ==
APHA is governed by a Governing Council composed of voting representatives from the various APHA member sections and independent state affiliates. The Governing Council receives reports from staff and member committees, adopts the official policy stances of the association, and elects a 24 member executive board to oversee the operations of the association. Members also serve in elected and appointed roles across the APHA member sections, committees, and several subordinate boards related to advocacy, education, science, publications, and other areas where collaboration is key.

== Membership ==
APHA has five types of membership: regular, retired, early-career professional, organizational, and student. Members receive an online subscription to the American Journal of Public Health and The Nation's Health as well as a weekly newsletter, Inside Public Health, access to APHA's online community, and an extensive members only webinar series.

== APHA awards ==
=== National APHA awards ===
The accomplishments of public health leaders are recognized through an awards program. APHA presents its national awards during its annual meeting. National APHA awards include:

- Sedgwick Memorial Medal
- APHA Award for Excellence
- David P. Rall Award for Advocacy
- Helen Rodríguez Trías Award
- Lyndon Haviland Public Health Mentoring Award
- Martha May Eliot Award
- Mortimer Spiegelman Award
- Milton and Ruth Roemer Prize
- Victor W. Sidel and Barry S. Levy Award for Peace
- Ayman El-Mohandes Young Professional Public Health Innovation Award

=== Section awards ===
Many APHA member sections also present awards in their particular field or focus area.

The Public Health Education and Health Promotion section recognizes individuals in six award categories. The awards include the Distinguished Career Award, Early Career Award, Mayhew Derryberry Award for contributions of behavioral scientists to health education, Mohan Sing Award for humor in health education, Sarah Mazelis Award for health education practitioners, and Rogers Award for public health communication.

The Statistics section offers the Mortimer Spiegelman Award to a statistician under the age of 40 for contribution to public health statistics.

Rema Lapouse Award – sponsored by the Mental Health, Epidemiology, and Statistics Sections, this award is granted to an outstanding scientist in the area of psychiatric epidemiology.

== Publications ==
The American Public Health Association publishes more than 70 public health books. Several of these are the reference source for their specialty within public health practice. Some publication titles include:

- Control of Communicable Diseases Manual
- Standard Methods for the Examination of Water and Wastewater
- Landesman's Public Health Management of Disasters: The Practice Guide
- Public Health Newswire
- Black Women's Reproductive Health and Sexuality: A Holistic Public Health Approach
- Health Inequities and African Americans: A Comprehensive Examination

In addition, APHA publishes the American Journal of Public Health, a monthly peer-reviewed public health journal covering public health and policy. APHA also publishes The Nation's Health, a monthly newspaper covering public health news and APHA updates.

== Annual meeting ==
The APHA Annual Meeting and Exposition is the largest meeting of public health professionals in the world. The meeting draws more than 13,000 attendees, offers 700 booths of exhibits and features more than 1,000 scientific sessions, representing the full spectrum of public health issues as well as the multifaceted nature of APHA in relation to the advancement of science and public health advocacy. Presentations cover new research and trends in public health science and practice.

== National Public Health Week ==
National Public Health Week is an observance organized annually by APHA during the first full week of April. The week’s activities are designed to raise awareness around issues that are important to improving the public’s health.

== Affordable Care Act ==
In June 2019, The American Public Health Association firmly condemned official litigation with the United States of America by the Trump administration. At the end of the Trump administration, the APHA opposed a legal filing with the Supreme Court which would have repealed the Affordable Care Act. This Supreme Court case was decided in June 2021, and the court left the Affordable Care Act in place.
