= 1976 swine flu outbreak =

1976 H1N1 swine influenza outbreak at Fort Dix

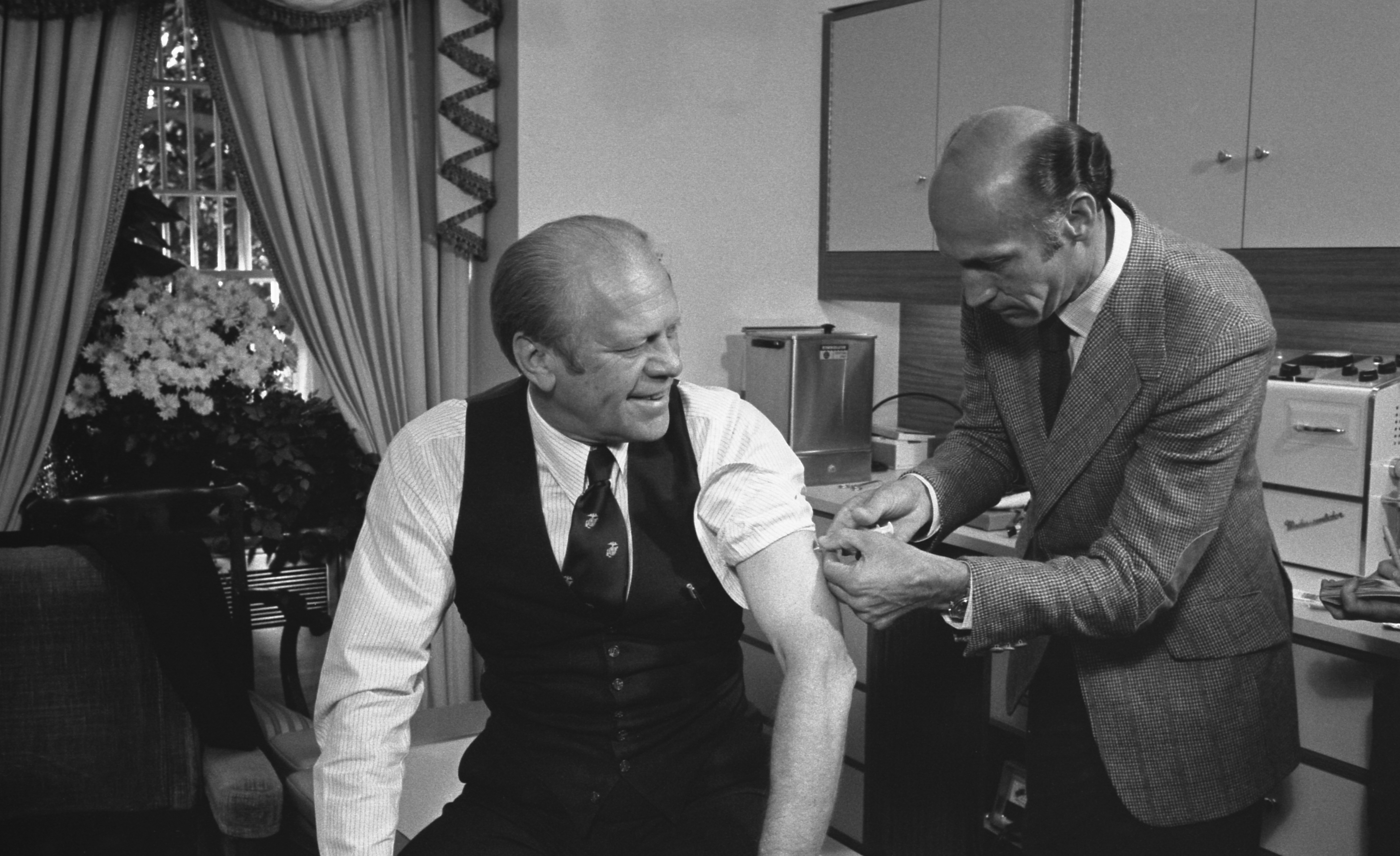
- President Gerald Ford receiving his vaccine for the swine flu
- Disease: Swine flu
- Pathogen: Strains of A/H1N1
- Location: United States of America
- First outbreak: Fort Dix, New Jersey
- Date: 1976
- Hospitalized cases: 13
- Deaths: 1

In 1976, an outbreak of the swine flu, influenza A virus subtype H1N1 at Fort Dix, New Jersey caused one death, hospitalized 13, and led to a mass immunization program. After the program began, the vaccine was associated with an increase in reports of Guillain–Barré syndrome (GBS), which can cause paralysis, respiratory arrest, and death. The immunization program was ended after approximately 43 million United States citizens had been administered the vaccine.

Richard Krause, director of the National Institute of Allergy and Infectious Diseases from 1975 to 1984, writes that the government response to the swine flu outbreak was considered to be too fast. The Centers for Disease Control and Prevention states, "Those who received the 1976 swine flu vaccine had a slight increased risk for developing GBS of approximately one additional case of GBS for every 100,000 people who got the swine flu vaccine."

The vaccination campaign has been characterized as a failure that is partially responsible for Americans' hesitancy to trust vaccines in the present day.

== Chronology ==
This chronology is heavily influenced by the official history of the affair, published in 1978 by the National Academies Press: The Swine Flu Affair: Decision-Making on a Slippery Disease.

In January 1976, several soldiers at Fort Dix complained of a respiratory illness diagnosed as influenza. The next month, Private David Lewis, who had the symptoms, participated in a 5-mile (8.0 km) forced march, collapsed and died. The New Jersey Department of Health tested samples from the Fort Dix soldiers. While the majority of samples were of the more common A Victoria flu strain, two were not. The atypical samples were sent to the Centers for Disease Control in Atlanta, Georgia, which found evidence of swine influenza A related to the 1918 flu pandemic, which killed 50 to 100 million people worldwide.

The Center for Disease Control (now the Centers for Disease Control and Prevention) verified the findings and informed both the World Health Organization and the state of New Jersey. On February 13, CDC Director David Sencer completed a memo calling for mass immunization for the swine flu. The CDC Assistant Director for Programs of the Center for Disease Control, Bruce Dull, held a press conference on February 19 to discuss the flu outbreak at Fort Dix and, in response to questions from reporters, mentioned the relationship of the flu strain to the 1918 outbreak.

U.S. President Gerald Ford was officially informed of the outbreak memo on March 15 and the suggested immunization program. He met with a "blue ribbon" panel that included Jonas Salk and Albert Sabin. Ford then made a televised announcement in support of the mass immunization program. A hearing was held before the United States Senate Appropriations Subcommittee on Labor, Health and Human Services, Education, and Related Agencies, and C. Joseph Stetler, a drug company spokesman, requested government indemnity for the vaccine manufacturers. Pharmaceutical companies Sharp & Dohme (Merck & Co.), Merrell, Wyeth, and Parke-Davis also refused to sell doses to the government unless they were guaranteed a profit, a concession that the government also eventually made.

The House Appropriations Committee reported out a special appropriations bill, including $135 million for the swine flu immunization program, which was approved on April 5. Two days later, the World Health Organization held a conference to discuss the implications of a swine flu outbreak for poorer nations.

On April 8, an official from the Federal Insurance Company informed Merck & Co., a manufacturer of the swine flu vaccine, that it would exclude indemnity on Merck's product liability for the swine flu vaccine on July 1, 1976. T. Lawrence Jones, president of the American Insurance Association, informed the Office of Management and Budget that the insurance industry would not cover liability for the vaccine unless the government extended liability protection. The chairman of Merck wrote a memo a day later, April 13, to various government agencies, including the White House emphasizing the "duty to warn". In May, other vaccine manufacturers including Marion Merrell Dow, Parke-Davis, and Wyeth, were notified of indemnity problems by their respective insurers. Assistant Secretary Theodore Cooper (HEW) informed the White House on June 2 that indemnity legislation would be needed to secure Merrell's cooperation. In June, other vaccine manufacturers requested the same legislation. A little more than two weeks later, the Ford administration submitted a proposal to Congress that offered indemnity to vaccine manufacturers.

Bruce Dull stated at a flu conference on July 1 that there were no parallels between the 1918 flu pandemic and the current situation. Later that month, J. Anthony Morris, a researcher in the Food and Drug Administration's Bureau of Biologics (BoB), was dismissed for insubordination and went public with findings that cast doubt on the safety of the vaccine, which was produced in fertilized hen's eggs. Three days later, several manufacturers announced that they had ceased production of the vaccine. Later that month, investigations into alleged swine flu outbreaks in other parts of the world found no cases of the strain. On July 23, the President sent a letter that urged Congress to take action on indemnification.

In early August, an outbreak of illness in Philadelphia was thought to be related to swine flu. It was later found to be an atypical pneumonia that is now called Legionnaires' disease. On August 6, Ford held a press conference and urged Congress to take action on the indemnification legislation. Four days later, both houses of Congress passed the legislation.

Merrill became the first company to submit samples to the FDA's Bureau of Biologics for safety testing, which approved it on September 2. Merck made the first shipment of vaccines to state health departments by September 22. The first swine flu inoculations were given at a health fair in Indianapolis, Indiana. Immunization started nationwide the next day.

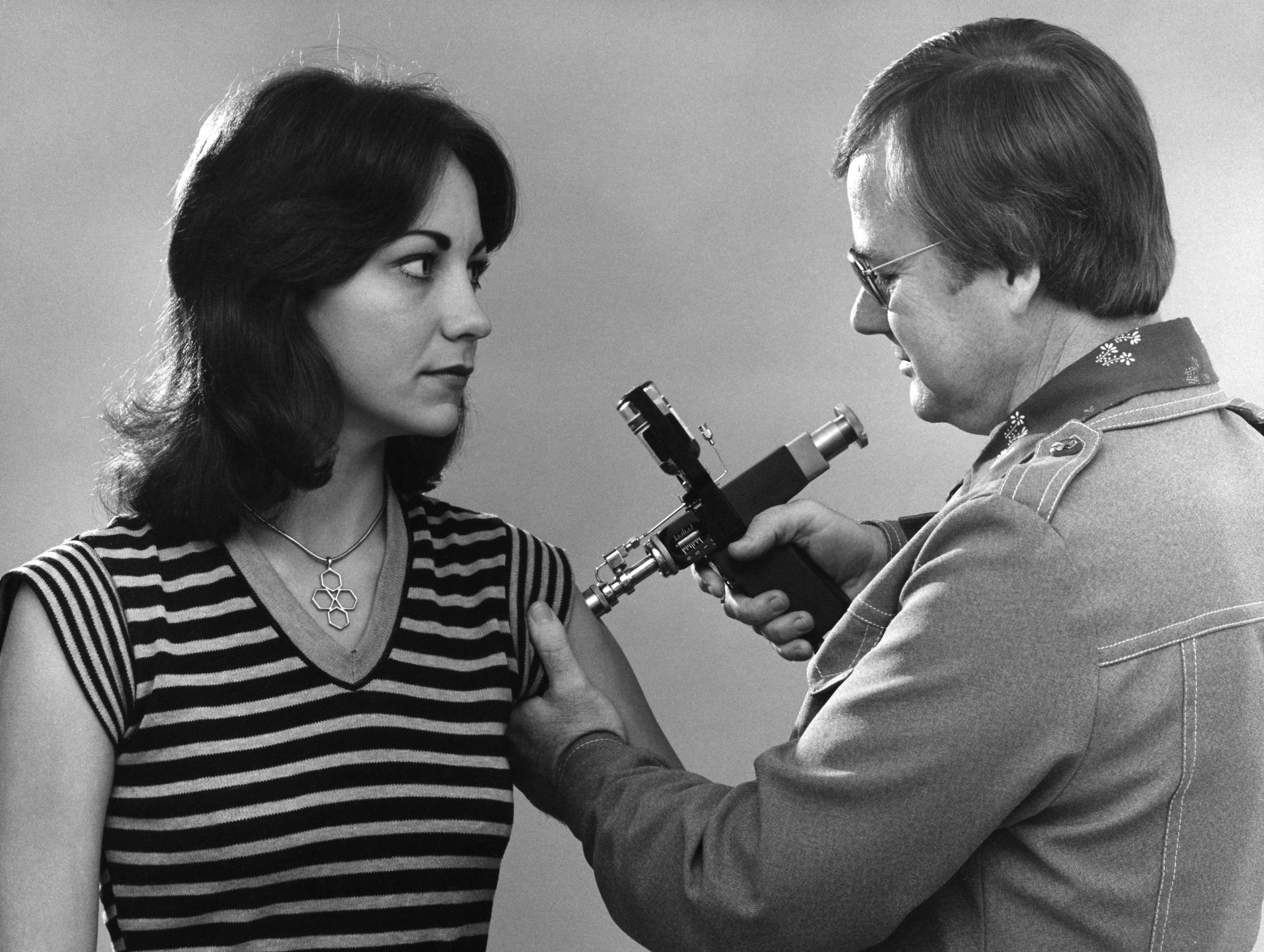
Jet injector used for immunization program

In October, three people died of heart attacks after they had received the vaccine at the same Pittsburgh clinic, which sparked an investigation and the recall of that batch of vaccine. The investigation showed that the deaths were not related to the immunization. The President and his family received their immunizations before the television cameras. On November 2, Ford lost the presidential election to Jimmy Carter.

Also in early November, Albert Sabin published a New York Times editorial, "Washington and the Flu." He agreed with the decision to create the vaccine and to be prepared for an outbreak but criticized the "scare tactics" that had been used by Washington to achieve that. He suggested to stockpile the vaccine and to have a wait-and-see strategy.

By 15 December, cases of Guillain-Barré syndrome (GBS) affecting vaccinated patients were reported in 10 states, including Minnesota, Maryland, and Alabama. Three more cases of Guillain-Barré were reported in early December, and the investigation into cases of it spread to eleven states. On December 16, a one-month suspension of the vaccination program was announced by Sencer. William Foege of the CDC estimated that the incidence of GBS was four times higher in vaccinated people than in those not receiving the swine flu vaccine. Ford told reporters that he agreed with the suspension, but he defended the decision to create the immunization program. Joseph A. Califano Jr. was sworn in as Secretary of Health, Education, and Welfare on January 20, 1977. On February 4, Sencer was informed that he would be replaced as the head of the CDC. The immunization program was not reinstated.

A summarizing study concludes "that vaccination overall is of public health benefit, helping to reduce mortality and prevent the thousands of deaths that occur from annual seasonal outbreaks, despite the possibility of an increased risk of GBS". In total, GBS cases occurred in 362 patients during the six weeks after influenza vaccination of 45 million persons.

== Aftermath ==
External videos
- Booknotes interview with Gina Kolata on Flu: The Story of the Great Influenza Pandemic of 1918 and the Search for the Virus That Caused It, February 27, 2000, C-SPAN

Laurence Gostin, in his article "At Law: Swine Flu Vaccine: What Is Fair?", wrote that "the swine flu affair fails to tell us whether, in the face of scientific uncertainty, it is better to err on the side of caution or aggressive intervention." There is not even complete agreement about the causal relationship between the swine flu vaccine and Guillain-Barré syndrome, as noted in Gina Kolata's book Flu: The Story of the Great Influenza Pandemic of 1918 and the Search for the Virus That Caused It. She wrote that the CDC did not have a "specific set of tests and symptoms to define Guillain-Barré" and that since doctors who reported cases already knew that a link was suspected, a bias in reporting was introduced. She quoted Keiji Fukuda: "if a new virus gets identified or reappears, you don't want to jump the gun and assume a pandemic is happening."

=== Effects on vaccine hesitancy ===
The 1976 swine flu vaccination campaign has been credited for increasing vaccine hesitancy among Americans due to the numerous problems associated with its rollout.

== See also ==
- COVID-19 pandemic
- 1918-19's Spanish flu
- 2009 swine flu pandemic
- 1976 Philadelphia Legionnaires' disease outbreak
