= David Sencer =

American health official (1924-2011)

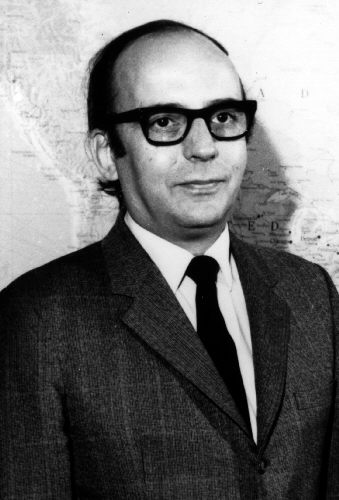

9th Director of the Centers for Disease Control and Prevention
- In office 1966 – May 1977
- President: Lyndon B. Johnson; Richard Nixon; Gerald Ford; Jimmy Carter
- Preceded by: James L. Goddard
- Succeeded by: William Foege

Commissioner of Health of the City of New York
- In office November 28, 1981 – March 11, 1986
- Mayor: Edward I. Koch
- Preceded by: Reinaldo Antonio Ferrer
- Succeeded by: Stephen C. Joseph

Personal details
- Born: November 10, 1924 Grand Rapids, Michigan, U.S.
- Died: May 2, 2011 (aged 86) Atlanta, Georgia, U.S.
- Education: University of Michigan (M.D.); Harvard University (M.P.H.)

David Judson Sencer (November 10, 1924 – May 2, 2011) was an American public health official who orchestrated the 1976 immunization program against swine flu. Between 1966 and 1977, he was the longest serving director of the Centers for Disease Control and Prevention (CDC). In this capacity, he convened a "Blue Ribbon Panel" to discuss the ethical concerns of Peter Buxtun regarding the ongoing Tuskegee Syphilis Study. From 1981 to 1986, he was Commissioner of Health of the City of New York.

== Personal life and education ==
Sencer was born on November 10, 1924, in Grand Rapids, Michigan. His father, who specialized in furniture, died in Sencer's early life, so his mother, Helen Furness, raised him. After receiving scholarships to Cranbrook School and Wesleyan University, he left Wesleyan before graduating and enlisting in the Navy. Subsequently, the Navy "sent him to medical school at the University of Mississippi. He completed his medical degree at the University of Michigan." During his stint at University of Michigan, tuberculosis consigned him to the hospital for a year and a half. This incident motivated him to study public health. Sencer would later go on to attain a Master's degree in public health at Harvard University.

In 2009, he was awarded an honorary B.A. degree from Wesleyan.

In 1951, Sencer married Jane Blood Sencer, with whom he had three children: Susan, a pediatric oncologist; Ann, an oncology nurse practitioner; and Stephen, chief legal officer for Emory University.

== U.S. Public Health Service career ==
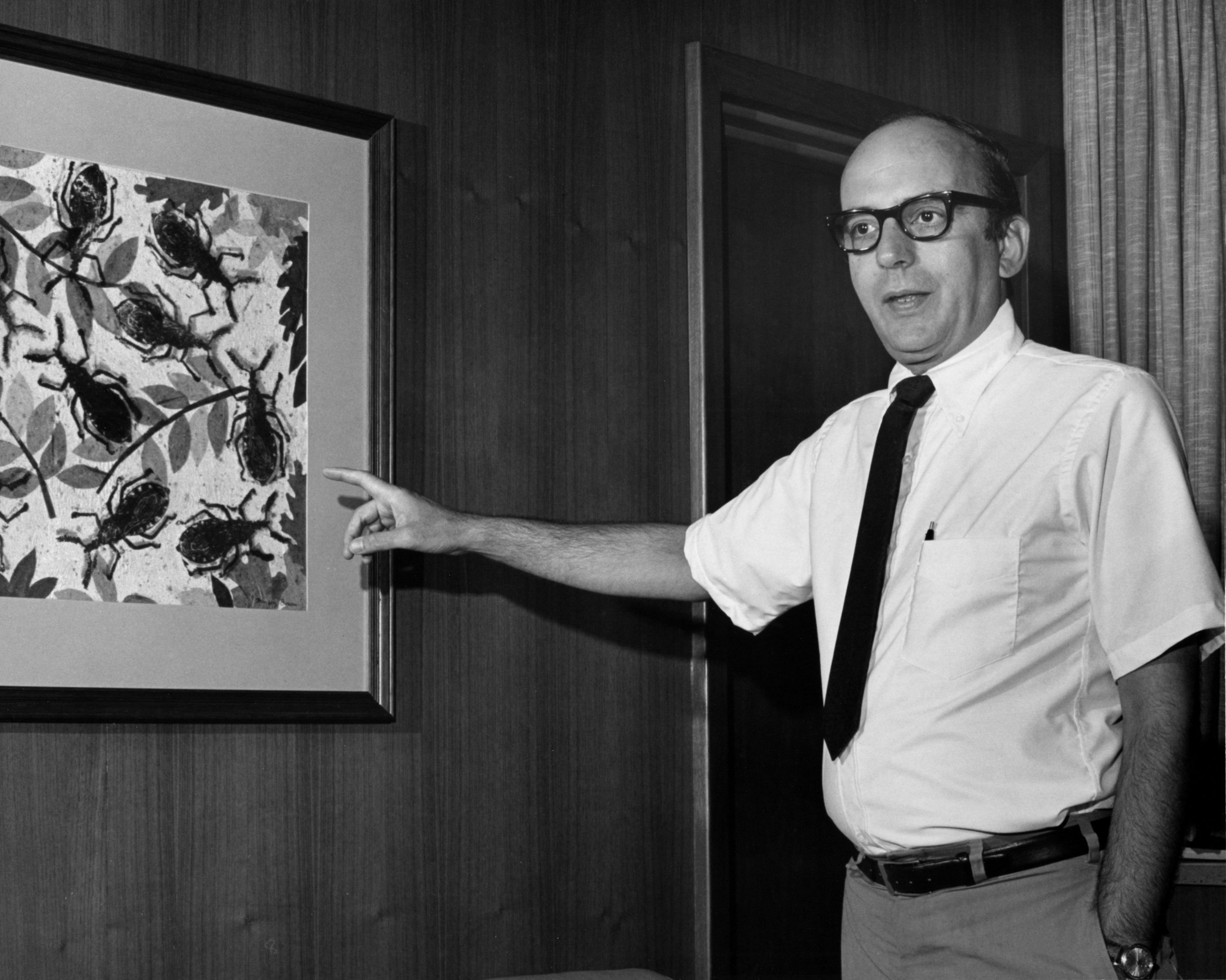
Sencer points to a depiction of Triatomine sp., which transmits Chagas disease.

In 1955, Sencer joined the US Public Health Service. In 1960, Sencer became the assistant director of the CDC, and in 1966, the director. In this capacity he played a major role in 1974 in establishing Emory University's public health department, which later became the Rollins School of Public Health.

The Tuskegee Syphilis Study continued under Sencer. When ethical concerns were raised internally by Peter Buxtun Sencer convened a panel in February 1969 to discuss the experiment.

During Sencer's administration, the CDC grew considerably, addressing for the first time malaria, nutrition, tobacco control, as well as family planning, health education, and occupational safety and health. Additionally, Sencer prepared instructions for the quarantine of astronauts returning from the Moon, which was suspected to harbor extraterrestrial pathogens.

The agency's most successful undertaking was a smallpox-prevention project in Central Africa and later in the rest of the world. This was among the CDC's first significant dealings with international public health, which the CDC presently directs. At the forefront of the effort was William H. Foege, who said: "I never asked [Sencer] for anything that he didn't deliver...He said you couldn’t protect U.S. citizens from smallpox without getting rid of it in the world, and that was a new approach. People in the field got all the praise, but he was the unsung hero. He just kept providing what we needed."

After the swine flu outbreak of 1976, in which over 200 recruits in Fort Dix, New Jersey were infected, Sencer resolved that all US citizens should be immunized. Precipitated both by his apprehensions of a recurrence of the 1918–1919 flu plague and by President Gerald Ford's incitement, the decision was later criticized as "rash and wasteful". It led the United States Public Health Service to request up to 200 million doses of vaccine. However, the anticipated pandemic did not emerge, and "rising percentages" of the 45 million vaccinated were afflicted with Guillain–Barré syndrome, which provoked over 24 deaths. Sencer was both condemned and supported. Having worked with Sencer at CDC, epidemiologist James W. Curran, explained, "Dave Sencer made a hard choice, and he did it for the right reason — to protect the American public... He was trying to protect Americans had there been [a swine flu epidemic], and absent one, there was bound to be criticism." In 2006, Sencer wrote a report on the swine flu program: "When lives are at stake, it is better to err on the side of overreaction than underreaction... In 1976, the federal government wisely opted to put protection of the public first".

That year, Legionnaires' disease, then unidentified, killed 29 attendees of a Philadelphia American Legion conference. Sencer sent 20 epidemiologists there to investigate, and months later they attributed the disease to a type of bacteria in the air-conditioning system in the hotel where the conference was held. When Jimmy Carter's presidency began, Secretary of Health, Education, and Welfare Joseph A. Califano Jr. dismissed Sencer as "part of the normal turnover of staff when administrations change", though it took until May 1977 to replace Sencer with William H. Foege.

== Later career ==
After a short stint in the private sector as Senior VP, Medicine at Becton, Dickinson & Co., Sencer, in 1982, during the development of the AIDS epidemic in New York City, rejoined the public sector as the health commissioner of the city, (Note: According to the Associated Press, being health commissioner of NYC was "considered one of the top jobs in U.S. public health".) whose mayor was Edward I. Koch. Although some appreciated his arrangement of weekly information-swapping sessions between doctors and public health officials, others, particularly those in the gay community, reprehended him for "dragging his feet". AIDS activist Larry Kramer contended, "He and his reign accounted for one of the most disastrous experiences of public health anywhere in the world... What did he do? He didn't do anything. He had a mayor who said, 'I don't want to know,' and Sencer fell into line." James Colgrove, however, acknowledged Sencer's "amending the city's codes so that AIDS cases were treated confidentially, defending the right of children with AIDS to attend public schools, and being an early advocate for a city-sponsored needle-exchange program". Colgrove agreed with critics that Sencer was a poor public educator. He neglected to disseminate information regarding sexual risk reduction for gay and bisexual men, and initially did not publicize that "casual contact" did not spread AIDS. Sencer also supported "free clean needles for addicts and fought to keep gay bathhouses open, believing they were an ideal place to teach safe sex".

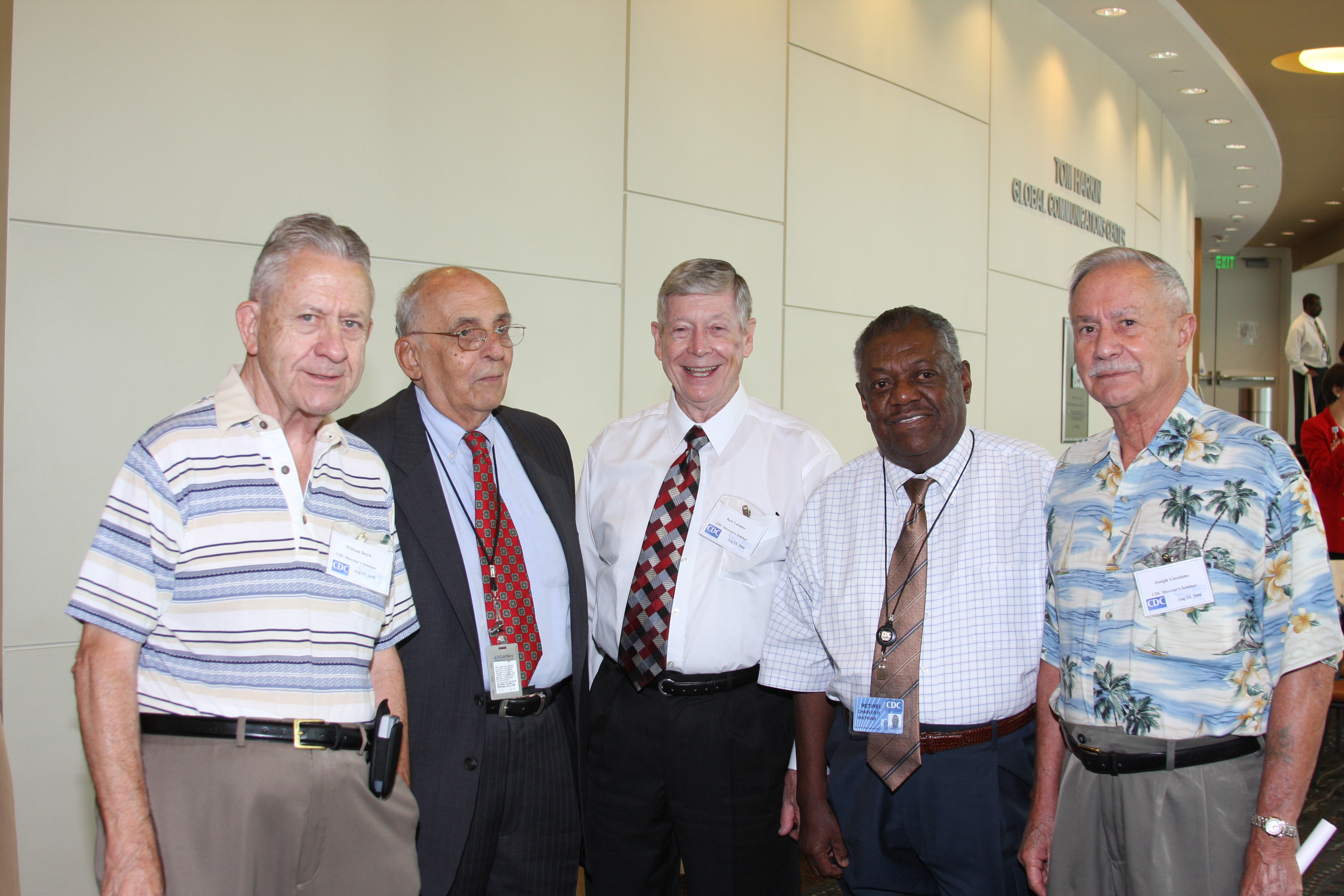
Sencer (second from left) in 2008

Former CDC director Thomas Frieden called Sencer "a public health giant... And until the end he continued to be a thoughtful and vibrant member of the public health community. At the height of the H1N1 pandemic of 2009, he was here full time, and I said, 'Can I pay you?' He said, 'No, this is a labor of love.'"

== Death ==
Sencer died from pneumonia on May 2, 2011, at the age of 86, in his hometown of Atlanta, Georgia.

He is the namesake of the David J. Sencer CDC Museum.

== References and notes ==
Notes

Government offices
Preceded by James L. Goddard	Director of the Centers for Disease Control and Prevention; 1966–1977	Succeeded by William Foege
Preceded by Reinaldo Antonio Ferrer	Commissioner of Health of the City of New York; 1981–1986	Succeeded by Stephen C. Joseph
