= J. Michael McGinnis =

American physician

- Born: July 12, 1944 (age 82); Columbia, Missouri, U.S.
- Education: University of California, Berkeley; University of California, Los Angeles; Harvard University

James Michael McGinnis (born 12 July 1944) is an American physician, epidemiologist, and long-time contributor to national and international health programs and policy, including continuous policy responsibilities for leadership in disease prevention and health promotion through four US Government Administrations (Carter, Reagan, Bush, Clinton). An elected member of the Institute of Medicine of the National Academies, he currently also serves as IOM Senior Scholar, as well as executive director of its Roundtable on Value & Science-Driven Health Care.

== Early life and education ==
Born in Columbia, Missouri, in 1944, McGinnis moved to California in 1949 when his father was sent by his employer, a manufacturer of power line equipment, to help open a west coast office in San Francisco. He attended public schools for K-12 in San Mateo, but from ages 9 to 17, his summers were spent back in Missouri, working on his maternal grandfather's corn, wheat and soy bean farm in central Missouri. Active in student government from an early age, he continued those interests as a pre-med undergraduate at the University of California at Berkeley, serving as the president of his graduating class.

During his undergraduate years at U.C. Berkeley, he created the Cal in the Capital internship program, which sends Berkeley students to Washington, DC, every summer to work in Congress, federal agencies, think tanks, and voluntary organizations. McGinnis graduated from Berkeley in 1966 with a BA in political science (political theory), and then attended UCLA, receiving both an MA in political science (international relations) and an MD in 1971. He later went on to study public policy at the Kennedy School at Harvard University, receiving an MPP in 1977. He was class commencement speaker for all three of his university graduating classes: Berkeley, UCLA Medical, and the Kennedy School at Harvard. After an internship in internal medicine at the Boston City Hospital, McGinnis completed a residency in preventive medicine while serving in the U.S. Public Health Service in 1972 as an international medical officer where he also learned to fly hot air balloons.

== International contributions ==
As part of his graduate studies in international relations, McGinnis spent time in residency at the World Health Organization offices in Lausanne and Geneva, exploring the diplomatic dynamics at the formation of the organization and the role it played in using its practical humanitarian mission to forge collaborative activities among often competing nations. When the time came for McGinnis to serve his military obligation, he joined the U.S. Public Health Service in 1972 as an international medical officer, serving as a coordinator for U.S.-Eastern European health programs. In 1974, he was recruited by DA Henderson to join the World Health Organization's smallpox eradication program in India. Working initially as a field epidemiologist tracking and containing reported cases, McGinnis assumed responsibility as WHO's State Coordinator for the eradication program in Uttar Pradesh, India's largest state, and oversaw the completion of the eradication effort and the implementation of the surveillance system for the maintenance phase of the program.

Returning to the United States after the end of smallpox, McGinnis shifted his focus for the next two decades to domestic health policy (see below), but from 1995 to 1996, again at the request of the World Health Organization, he became chair of the World Bank/European Commission Sectoral Task Force on Health and Human Services in Bosnia. This was one of several task forces established to manage support for postwar reconstruction of the basic infrastructure, economic, and human service capabilities in the war-torn region. Under McGinnis’ leadership, the Task Force developed the first bilateral agreement outside of the Dayton Accords, forging consensus on primary care reconstruction priorities by the health ministries of both the Republica Srpska and Bosnia & Herzegovina.

== Health determinants ==
The contribution for which McGinnis is best personally known is improving understanding and insights into the basic determinants of health. His 1993 paper in The Journal of the American Medical Association, “Actual Causes of Death” co-authored with William Foege, focused attention on the root causes of the nation's leading killers and underscored the preventability of many of the nation's leading health threats. Building on a growing evidence base linking lifestyle, environment, and behavior to health, the McGinnis and Foege article pointed out that the conditions holding leading positions on mortality tables—e.g. heart disease, cancer, stroke, injury, diabetes—were in fact caused substantially by factors such as tobacco, diet and activity patterns, alcohol, toxic agents, and other potentially controllable sources. They identified nine leading preventable root causes of death, and calculated that the behavior-related factors on the list alone accounted for about 40% of deaths in the United States.

McGinnis extended his work to reframe the notion of health, from a view that is disease-centric to one that captures more broadly the full range of factors that lead to disease and early death—or to good health. Drawing from the work on actual causes, as well as a developing evidence base on the influence of stress, class distinctions, socio-economic status, and genetics, he organized his assessment around the perspective that health is fundamentally shaped by determinants that fall within five domains: genetic predispositions, social circumstances, physical environments, behavioral choices, and medical care. Underscoring that the most important dynamics occur at the intersections of the determinant domains, his 2002 paper in Health Affairs, “The Case for More Active Policy Attention to Health Promotion”, co-authored with Pamela Russo and James Knickman, summarized quantitative assessments of the relative contributions of each of these five domains to the overall burden of early death in the population. As noted in the paper's title, the most notable policy asynchrony they pointed out was that, while only 10 to 15% of premature deaths could be avoided through improvements in health care, 95% of aggregate national spending on health goes to medical care services.

== The Healthy People program ==
In 1977, McGinnis was a Fellow at Harvard Medical School's Center for Community Health and Medical Care when he accepted an offer from the newly appointed Secretary of Health, Education, and Welfare Joseph Califano to return to Washington to work in the Carter Administration. He was appointed Deputy Assistant Secretary for Health in the U.S. Department of Health, Education and Welfare (now Department of Health and Human Services), and served through four Administrations—Presidents Jimmy Carter, Ronald Reagan, George H. W. Bush, and William J. Clinton—while also serving as Assistant Surgeon General and Director of the U.S. Office of Disease Prevention.

During this period, McGinnis chaired the Secretary's Task Force on Smoking and Health, which resulted in Secretary Califano's 1974 decision to elevate the federal leadership profile on tobacco control; led the development of Healthy People, the nation's prevention agenda; developed, with USDA, the first Dietary Guidelines for Americans; and created the U.S. Preventive Services Task Force in 1984 to develop an ongoing systematic and comprehensive assessment of the effectiveness of clinical preventive services, thereby helping to pioneer the broader advance of evidence-based medicine.

Healthy People is perhaps the most widely known of McGinnis’ policy contributions. Begun when he was serving as Chair of the Secretary's Task Force on Disease Prevention and Health Promotion for HEW Secretary Joseph Califano and Surgeon General Julius Richmond in 1978, it started as an effort to develop a Surgeon General's report to serve as a U.S. answer to A New Perspective on the Health of Canadians, a groundbreaking report released in 1974 by Canadian Minister of Health Marc Lalonde.

McGinnis felt the U.S. report could go beyond simply marshaling the scientific evidence underpinning the power of prevention, to establish quantifiable, evidence-based goals for improving the health of Americans through preventive interventions. This strategy reflected McGinnis' experience in India with the successful eradication of smallpox, which used quantified targets to drive focus and the deployment of resources. Published in 1979, Healthy People: The Surgeon General's Report on Health Promotion and Disease Prevention included the first-ever measurable, decade-long goals for reducing death rates for Americans by 1990 at each of the major life stages: reducing infant mortality by 35%, childhood mortality by 20%, adolescent and young adult mortality by 20%, and adult mortality by 25%. For older adults, the goal was to reduce the average number of sick days by 20% over the decade.

McGinnis also launched a parallel effort involving each of the agencies of the U.S. Public Health Service (National Institutes of Health, Centers for Disease Control, Food and Drug Administration, Indian Health Service, Health Resources and Services Administration, and Alcohol, Drug Abuse, and Mental Health Administration), in cooperative work with non-governmental experts from around the country to develop measurable 1990 objectives in 15 priority areas within the three prevention domains: health promotion, health protection, and clinical preventive services. These objectives targeted improvements on issues such as tobacco use, environmental quality, and high blood pressure control, child passenger restraints, occupational health, and environmental quality deemed necessary to achieve the national goals. The objectives were released in 1980 in Promoting Health/Preventing Disease: Objectives for the Nation.

A broad range of stakeholders rallied around the newly minted national prevention agenda, including through the Healthy People Consortium, which brought states, major cities, and voluntary national organizations together to adopt and tailor these national objectives to their particular needs and priorities. When the 1990 results came in, progress toward better health was on or close to the stated goals in each case: a 35% reduction in infant mortality, a 25% reduction in child deaths, a 12% reduction for adolescent and young adult deaths, a 25% lower adult death rate, and 17% fewer days of disability for older adults. The Healthy People process continues today, building on national goals and objectives over more than three decades through Healthy People 2000, Healthy People 2010, and the current objectives, Healthy People 2020. A number of other countries have since developed similar efforts, and related work in the U.S. led to the development of a high priority set of national Leading Health Indicators, the pilot work group for which was chaired by McGinnis as part of the Healthy People 2010 process.

== Other U.S. policy initiatives ==
Other programs and policies launched by McGinnis include: the first HHS/USDA Dietary Guidelines for Americans, now in its seventh edition; the first Surgeon General's Report on Nutrition and Health (1988); and the work of the Public Health Functions Steering Committee to develop the 10 Essential Services of Public Health. The latter initiative was an outgrowth of the town hall meetings he co-hosted in 1994 with the health commissioners in each of the 50 state capitals for public discussions on the importance of public health as a component of health reform.

McGinnis also initiated: the National Coordinating Committee on Worksite Health Promotion (1979–1987) to catalyze employer commitment to healthier workforces, the National Coordinating Committee on School Health (co-chaired by HHS, the Department of Education and USDA), and the Panel on Cost Effectiveness in Health and Medicine, which developed guidelines for the conduct of economic analyses of the returns to health investments.

From 1999 to 2005, McGinnis served as senior vice president and founding director of the Health Group, and as counselor to the president of the Robert Wood Johnson Foundation (RWJF). At RWJF, his charge was to build the Foundation's contribution to the development of national leadership and capacity for a stronger focus on population health. Hallmarks of this work include the launch of the RWJF Active Living family of programs, the Health & Society Scholars Program, and the Young Epidemiology Scholars Program. Along with RWJF's flagship work in tobacco control, The Active Living Programs represented the first major national health promotion initiative focused on design, engineering, and policy strategies to re-engineer physical activity back into peoples’ living and working environments.

The RWJF Health & Society Scholars Program was created to train a generation of extraordinary interdisciplinary scientific and policy experts to lead understanding and action at the intersections of the domains determining health prospects—genetics, social circumstances, physical environments, behavioral choices, and medical care. The RWJF Young Epidemiology Scholars Program was a competitive regional and national program to engage high school students in innovative project work in epidemiology—the basic science of public health, modeled on the prizes established by the Westinghouse and Intel corporations to encourage student interest and initiative in mathematics, physics, chemistry, and biology.

== The IOM Learning Health System Initiative ==
Since 2005, McGinnis has served as IOM senior scholar and executive director of the Roundtable on Value & Science-Driven Health Care. He founded and stewards the IOM's initiative to accelerate the evolution of a continuously learning health system, described in the Roundtable’s Charter as one “in which science, informatics, incentives, and culture are aligned for continuous improvement and innovation, with best practices seamlessly embedded in the delivery process and new knowledge captured as an integral by-product of the delivery experience.” The initiative is motivated by changes in the complexity and costs of care, shortfalls in its performance, and newly emerging digitally-based tools. The initiative focuses on improving awareness of possibilities and stimulating activities to capture them. The work to improve understanding is being undertaken through the Roundtable's Learning Health System Series of publications exploring the prospects and strategies in areas ranging from research and the clinical data utility to shared decision-making and care culture. On the action front, the Roundtable has developed the concept of Innovation Collaboratives, in which The National Academies steward cooperative projects requiring a trusted scientific forum to accelerate progress aimed at transformational change in the value, science, and culture of health and health care. Currently, the Roundtable stewards about two dozen projects across six collaboratives: Best Practices (health professions societies), Clinical Effectiveness Research (clinical research organizations), Evidence Communication (marketing community), Digital Learning (IT community), Systems Approaches (operations engineers), and Value Incentives (payers and employers).

== Voluntary service and recognitions ==
McGinnis has served on various national committees and boards, including the National Academies IOM Committee on Children's Food Marketing (chair), the NIH State-of-the-Science Conference on Multivitamins in Chronic Disease Prevention (chair), and the Health Professionals Roundtable on Preventive Services (chair), the National Governors Association Commission on Childhood Obesity (co-chair), the Board of Directors of the Nemours Foundation, and the Partnership for Prevention (chair, policy committee). He previously served on the NAS Board on Agriculture, Health and the Environment; the NAS Food and Nutrition Board; the Institute of Medicine's Roundtable on Health and the Environment; the HHS Nutrition Policy Board (chair); the HHS Working Group on Leading Health Indicators (chair); the HHS Task Force on Health Risk Assessment (chair); the National Coordinating Committee on Clinical Preventive Services (chair); and the Armed Forces Epidemiological Board.

McGinnis is an elected member of the Institute of Medicine of the National Academies, Fellow of the American College of Epidemiology and Fellow of the American College of Preventive Medicine. McGinnis' recognitions for his contributions to society include the Wilbur Cohen Award, the Porter Prize, the Distinguished Service Medal of the U.S. Public Health Service, the National Health Leader of the Year Award, and the Public Health Hero Award.
