= David J. Sencer CDC Museum =

Coordinates: 33°47′57″N 84°19′47″W

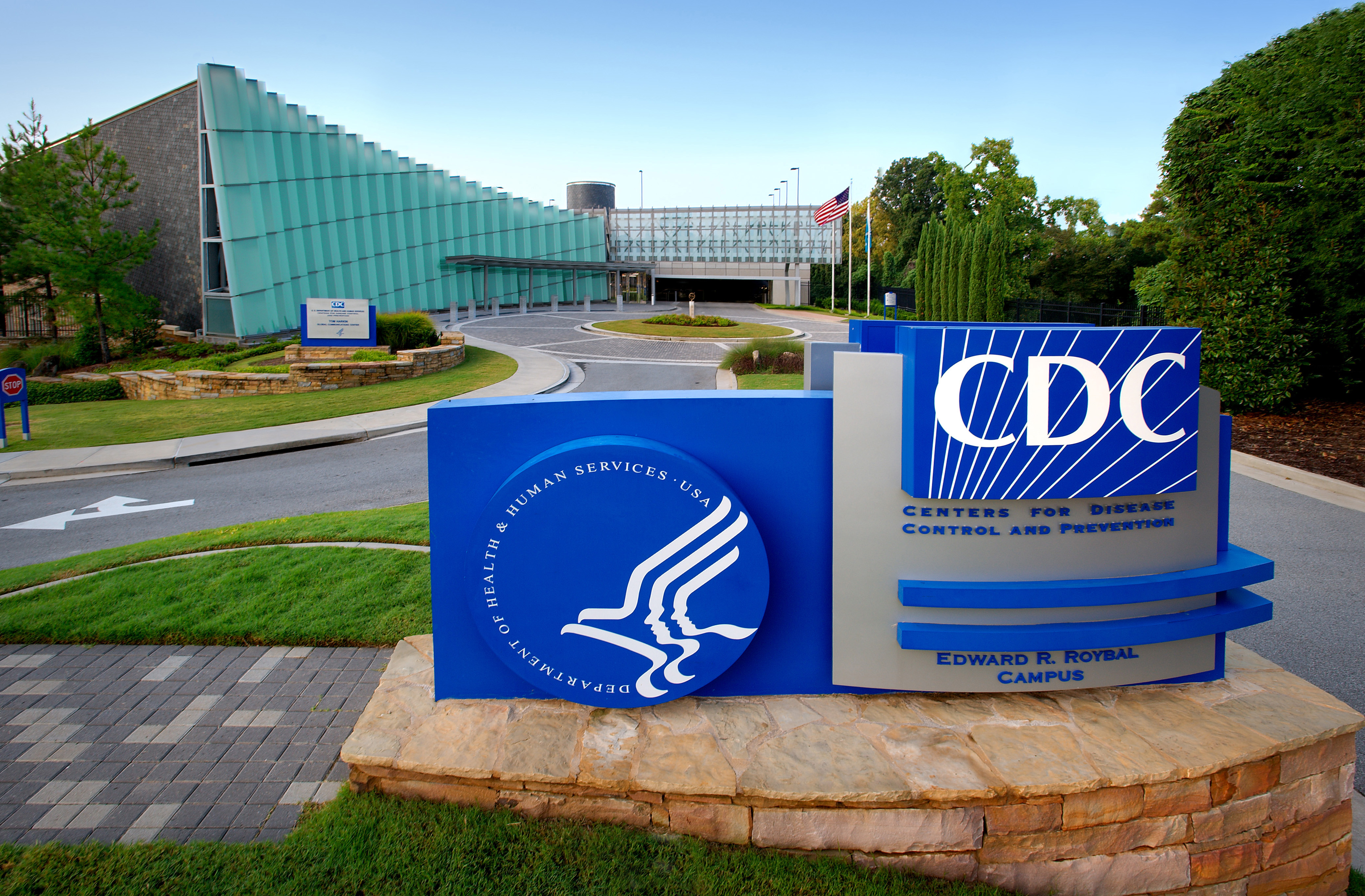
- The exterior of the David J. Sencer CDC Museum
- Former name: Global Health Odyssey Museum
- Established: 1996
- Location: Atlanta, Georgia, U.S.
- Visitors: 90,000
- Website: https://www.cdc.gov/museum/

The David J. Sencer CDC Museum, often referred to as the CDC Museum, is a museum about the U.S. Centers for Disease Control and Prevention located in Atlanta, Georgia. The museum is affiliated with the Smithsonian Institution.

== Mission ==
The CDC Museum’s mission is to educate visitors about the value of prevention–based public health, while collecting, preserving, and presenting CDC’s rich heritage and vast accomplishments through engaging museum exhibitions, dynamic educational programming, and web archives.

— U.S. Centers for Disease Control and Prevention

== History ==
The museum was founded in 1996 as the Global Health Odyssey Museum. This was done during the 50th anniversary of the CDC and coincided with the 1996 Summer Olympics in Atlanta. In 2011, the museum was renamed the David J. Sencer CDC Museum. This was done in honor of David Sencer, an American public health official who was the longest serving director of the CDC.

Exhibitions at the museum include public health topics and the history of the CDC. The museum is a Smithsonian Affiliate Museum. The museum receives approximately 90,000 visitors annually.

In 2020 and 2021, the museum was temporarily closed because of the COVID-19 pandemic.

The museum closed again after a shooting in August 2025.
