= J. Michael Lane =

American epidemiologist (1936–2020)

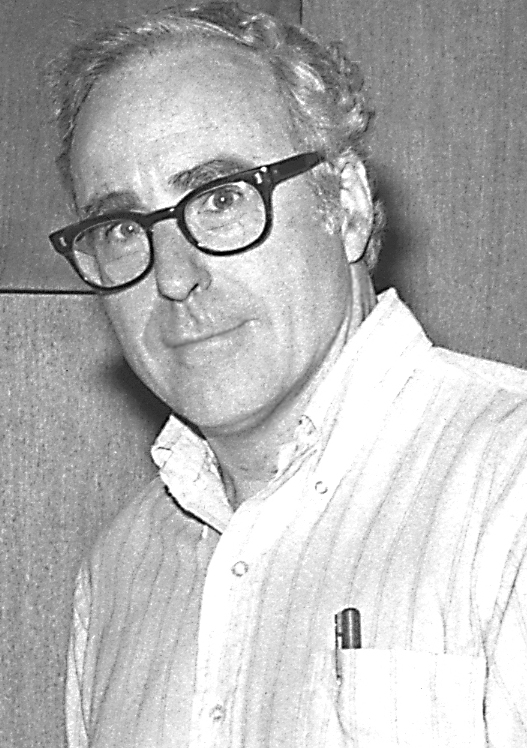
- Lane in 1980
- Born: John Michael Lane; February 14, 1936; Boston, Massachusetts, U.S.
- Died: October 21, 2020 (aged 84); Atlanta, Georgia, U.S.
- Known for: Global efforts in eradicating smallpox
- Spouse: Carolina Hernandez (m. 1969; div. 1998) Lila Elizabeth Summer (m. 1998)

John Michael Lane (February 14, 1936 – October 21, 2020) was an American epidemiologist who was a director of the Epidemic Intelligence Service's Global Smallpox Eradication program from 1973 to 1981, and who played a leading role in the eradication of smallpox in 1977.

== Early life ==
John Michael Lane was born on February 14, 1936, in Boston, Massachusetts, to Eileen O'Connor and Alfred Baker Lewis. His mother was on the national board of the YWCA and a director of Planned Parenthood, and his father was a pro bono lawyer for the early NAACP and later a treasurer of the organization. Lane had two brothers, a half-brother, and two half-sisters. When he was six, his family moved to Greenwich, Connecticut, where Lane studied at the private Brunswick School. He graduated with a bachelor's degree from Yale University in 1957; a medical degree from Harvard University in 1961; and a public health epidemiology degree from the University of California, Berkeley in 1967. Lane completed his internship at the Bellevue Hospital, in New York.

== Career ==
Lane started his career as an epidemiologist with the Centers for Disease Control and Prevention's (CDC) Epidemic Intelligence Service in 1963. He was assigned to the smallpox and other infectious diseases division within CDC. During this time, he traveled to countries in Africa and south-east Asia, including Pakistan, India, Bangladesh, and Indonesia, to undertake vaccination campaigns and combat outbreaks of the disease.

In 1973, Lane was appointed as the director of the Global Smallpox Eradication program. He served in this position through 1981 as the last director of the program, successfully overseeing the eradication of the disease in 1977. The last case of the disease was reported in Somalia in 1977, and it was declared as having been eradicated in 1980. Speaking later about the strategies adopted, Lane recounted the role of volunteers who administered the vaccines, and the vaccination process itself. He spoke of the importance of cooperating with local tribal regional leaders to ensure that the programs were administered to local populations. An additional strategy that was adopted to circumvent the shortage of vaccines was to move from 'mass vaccination' to 'ring vaccination', with the latter strategy focused on 'surveillance and containment', and targeted vaccination within villages with known victims.

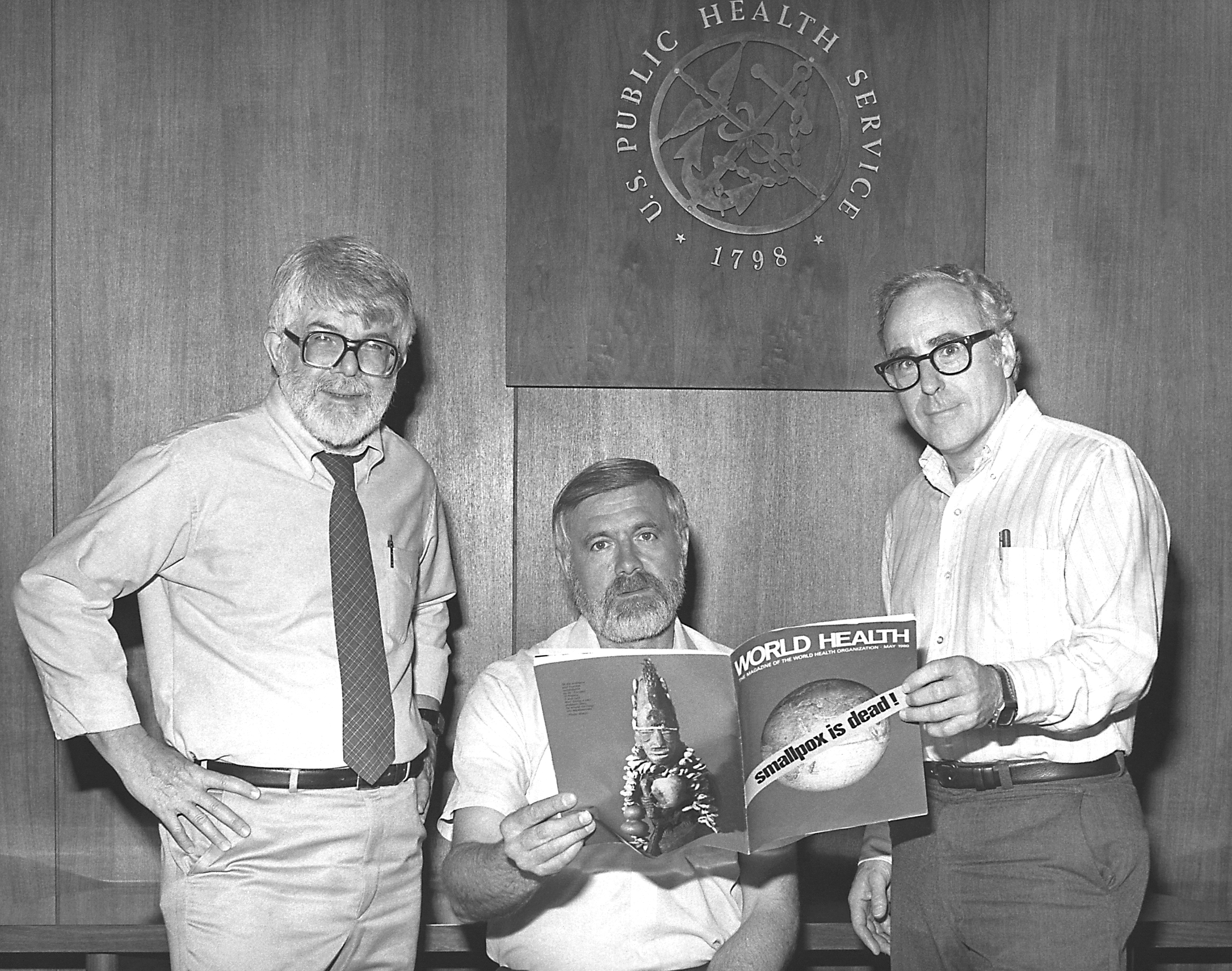
Lane (right) with J. Donald Millar and William Foege, previous directors of the Global Smallpox Eradication Program, with the global announcement of the eradication of smallpox, 1980

Following his role with the Smallpox Eradication program, Lane stayed with the CDC through 1987 as a director of the Center for Prevention Services. He went on to teach at Emory University in Atlanta between 1988 and 1991, and at the Australian National University between 1991 and 1993, where he helped set up the Australian Field Epidemiology Training Program and served as the program director. Lane returned to teach at Emory University in 1993 and continued through 2001.

In the early 21st century, Lane was a proponent for the destruction of the existing stocks of smallpox vaccine because of its potential usage as a bio-terrorist weapon, and pleaded that Russia and the United States destroy their remaining vaccines.

== Personal life ==
Lane married Carolina Hernandez in 1969. The couple divorced in 1998. He subsequently married Lila Elizabeth Summer in 1998. Lane was an avid bird-watcher, trekker, and scuba diver. He completed a trek across the United States from Atlanta to Seattle when he was 79.

Lane died from colon cancer on October 21, 2020, at his home in Atlanta.

== Select publications ==
- Winkelstein, Warren; French, Fern E.; Lane, J. Michael (1969). Basic Readings in Epidemiology. MSS Educational Publishing Company. ISBN 978-0842250177
- Lane, J. Michael; Summer, Lila (2009), "Smallpox as a Weapon for Bioterrorism", in Fong, I. W.; Alibek, Kenneth (eds.), Bioterrorism and Infectious Agents: A New Dilemma for the 21st Century, Emerging Infectious Diseases of the 21st Century, New York, NY: Springer, pp. 147–167, doi:10.1007/978-1-4419-1266-4_5, ISBN 978-1-4419-1266-4, PMC 7120382
- Lane, J. Michael; Ruben, Frederick L.; Neff, John M.; Millar, J. D. (November 27, 1969). "Complications of Smallpox Vaccination, 1968: National Surveillance in the United States". New England Journal of Medicine. 281 (22): 1201–1208. doi:10.1056/NEJM196911272812201. ISSN 0028-4793. PMID 4186802.
- Rutstein, David D.; Berenberg, William; Chalmers, Thomas C.; Child, Charles G.; Fishman, Alfred P.; Perrin, Edward B.; Feldman, Jacob J.; Leaverton, Paul E.; Lane, J. Michael; Sencer, David J.; Evans, Carleton C. (March 11, 1976). "Measuring the Quality of Medical Care: A Clinical Method". New England Journal of Medicine. 294 (11): 582–588. doi:10.1056/NEJM197603112941104. ISSN 0028-4793. PMID 942758.
- Lane, J. Michael; Ruben, Frederick L.; Neff, John M.; Millar, J. D. (1970). "Complications of Smallpox Vaccination, 1968: Results of Ten Statewide Surveys". The Journal of Infectious Diseases. 122 (4): 303–309. doi:10.1093/infdis/122.4.303. ISSN 0022-1899. JSTOR 30108332. PMID 4396189.
- Lane, J. Michael (April 20, 1970). "Deaths Attributable to Smallpox Vaccination, 1959 to 1966, and 1968". JAMA: The Journal of the American Medical Association. 212 (3): 441–4. doi:10.1001/jama.1970.03170160031005. ISSN 0098-7484. PMID 4392370.
- Foege, William H.; Millar, J. Donald; Lane, J. Michael (October 1, 1971). "Selective Epidemiologic Control In Smallpox Eradication". American Journal of Epidemiology. 94 (4): 311–315. doi:10.1093/oxfordjournals.aje.a121325. ISSN 1476-6256. PMID 5110547.
