= William Foege =

American physician and epidemiologist (1936–2026)

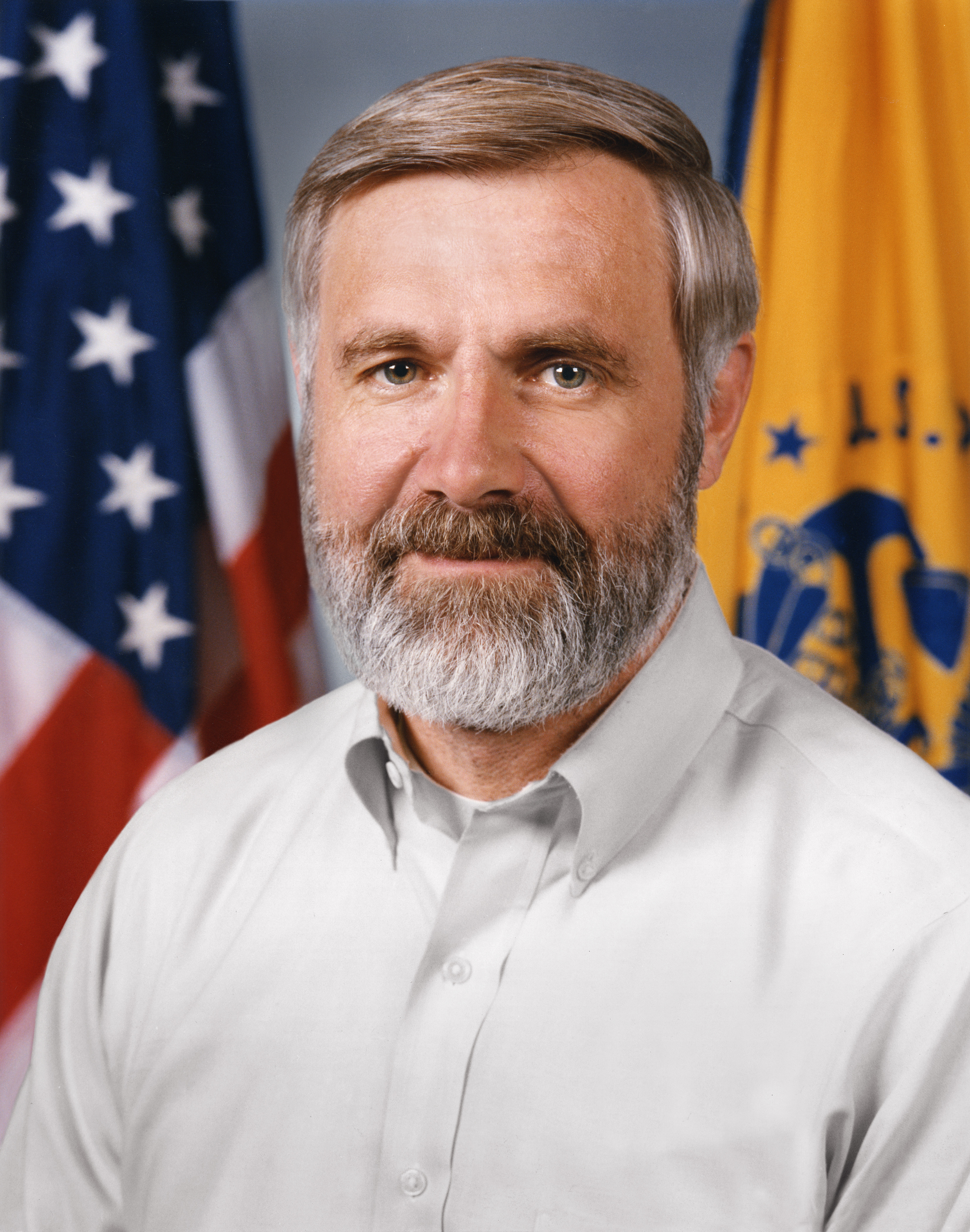

10th Director of the Centers for Disease Control and Prevention
- In office May 1977 – November 30, 1983
- President: Jimmy Carter; Ronald Reagan
- Preceded by: David Sencer
- Succeeded by: James Mason

Personal details
- Born: William Herbert Foege; March 12, 1936 Decorah, Iowa, U.S.
- Died: January 24, 2026 (aged 89) Atlanta, Georgia, U.S.
- Spouse: Paula Foege
- Children: 3 (1 predeceased)
- Education: Pacific Lutheran University (BA); University of Washington (MD); Harvard University (MPH)
- Awards: Calderone Prize (1996); Conrad N. Hilton Humanitarian Prize

William Herbert Foege (/ˈfeɪɡi/ FAY-ghee; March 12, 1936 – January 24, 2026) was an American physician and epidemiologist who is credited with "devising the global strategy that led to the eradication of smallpox in the late 1970s". From May 1977 to 1983, Foege served as the director of the Centers for Disease Control and Prevention. Foege also "played a central role" in efforts that greatly increased immunization rates in developing countries in the 1980s.

== Early life ==
Foege was born in Decorah, Iowa, on March 12, 1936. He was the third of six children born to William A. Foege, a Lutheran minister, and Anne Erika Foege. The family lived in Eldorado, Iowa, in Fayette County, starting in 1936 and moved to Chewelah, Washington, in 1945.

In his younger days he was inspired by the life of his uncle, a Lutheran missionary to New Guinea. He became interested in science at age 13 when working at a pharmacy, and read extensively about the world (e.g., Albert Schweitzer's work in Africa) while in a body cast for several months at age 15. When he was a teenager, he expressed a desire to practice medicine in Africa.

== Education ==
Foege received a B.A. from Pacific Lutheran University in 1957. He attended medical school at the University of Washington, where he became interested in public health while working "after school and on Saturdays" at the Seattle–King County Health Department. After receiving his M.D. in 1961, he completed an internship with the United States Public Health Service hospital at Staten Island in 1961–1962.

He participated in the Epidemic Intelligence Service (EIS) of the Centers for Disease Control and Prevention (CDC) between 1962 and 1964, assigned to Colorado. When Foege was with the EIS, he was inspired by Alexander Langmuir to pursue global health, and spent a short time with the Peace Corps in India under Charles Snead Houston. Upon reading a lecture on priorities in public health by Thomas Huckle Weller, Foege entered the Master of Public Health program at the Harvard School of Public Health where he studied with Weller, and received his M.P.H. in 1965.

== Smallpox eradication ==
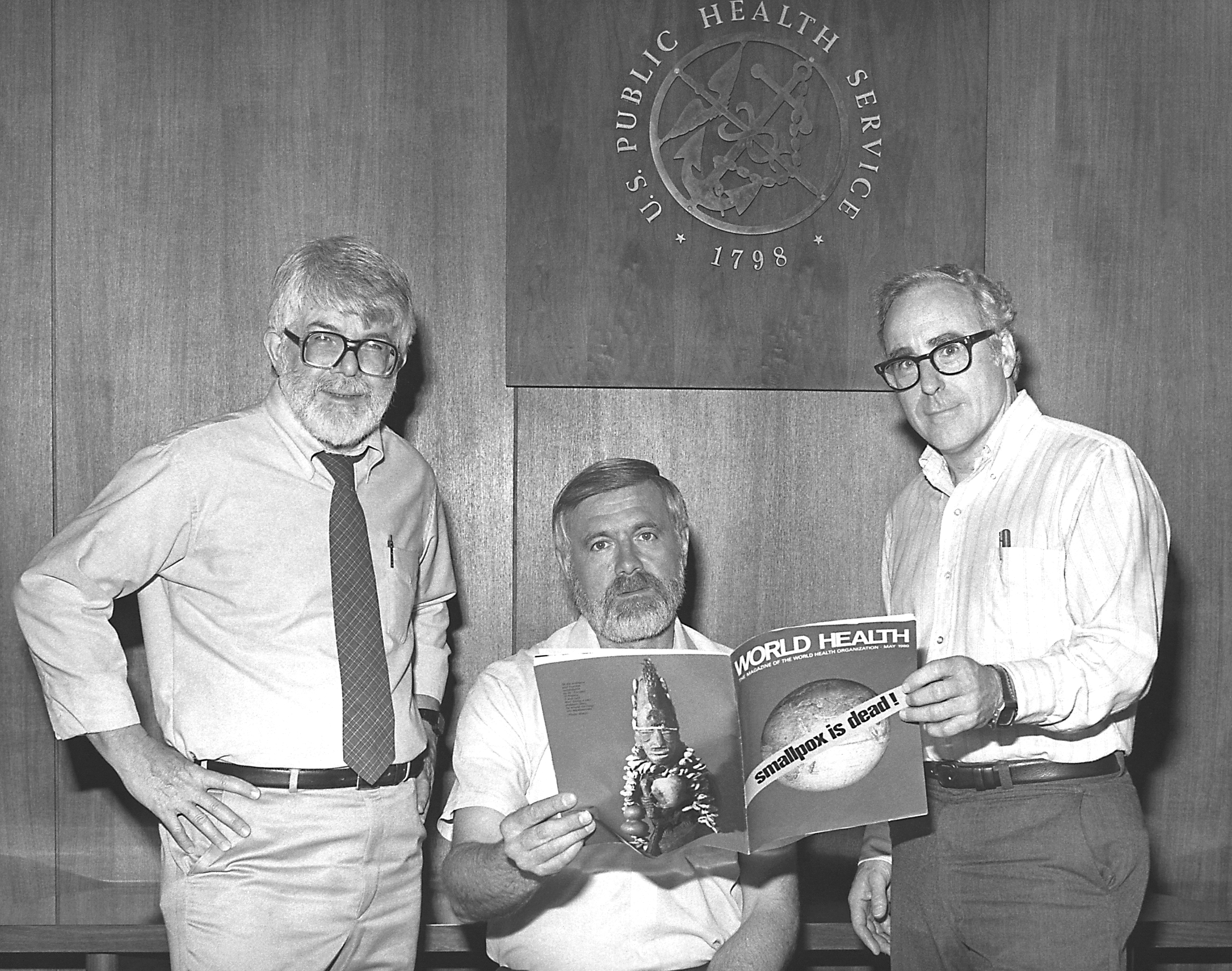
Directors of CDC Smallpox Eradication Program, from left: J. Donald Millar (1966-'70), William H. Foege (1970-'73), and J. Michael Lane (1973-'81) reading news of smallpox's eradication in 1980

While working as a medical missionary in Nigeria in 1966, Foege developed the highly successful surveillance and ring vaccination strategy to contain the spread of smallpox. In contrast to mass vaccinations which was the standard at the time, Foege's strategy focused on targeted vaccination of people exposed to cases of smallpox instead, ensuring that the limited resources available sufficed to eradicate outbreaks of smallpox in the country. This strategy became key to global eradication efforts against smallpox, with the condition later becoming the first infectious disease to be eradicated in human history in 1980. Foege also served as chief of the smallpox eradication program of the CDC.

For his efforts to eradicate smallpox, Foege was the co-winner of the 2020 Future of Life Award along with Viktor Zhdanov. "We're all indebted to Bill Foege and Viktor Zhdanov for their critical contributions to the eradication of smallpox, which demonstrated the immense value of science and international collaboration for fighting disease", said António Guterres, Secretary General, United Nations, quoted in a press release on the award. Dr. William MacAskill said, "Smallpox was one of the worst diseases to ever befall the human race, and its eradication is one of the greatest achievements of humanity. Bill Foege and Viktor Zhdanov should be celebrated for their contributions, and should inspire us today to take effective action to tackle the world's most pressing problems." In consideration of the achievements of Zhdanov and Foege, Bill Gates added, "They [Viktor and Bill] are phenomenal examples of what it means to harness science for global health".

== Career ==
Foege's research includes child survival and development, injury prevention, population, preventive medicine, and public health leadership—particularly in the developing world. He was a strong proponent of disease eradication and control and took an active role in the eradication of Guinea Worm Disease, polio and measles, and the elimination of river blindness.

In May 1977, he became the director of the Centers for Disease Control and Prevention, and served until 1983.

Directorship aside, he also held various positions during his career:

- President, co-founder, The Task Force for Global Health, 1984–1999
- Senior Fellow, Global Health Program, Bill & Melinda Gates Foundation
- Advisory Board Member, Emory University Global Health Institute
- Professor Emeritus, Rollins School of Public Health
- Health Policy Fellow, The Carter Center, 1986–present
- Executive Director, The Carter Center, 1986–1992
- Advisory Medical Board Member, Theranos

In June 2011, Foege authored House on Fire: The Fight to Eradicate Smallpox, a book on the triumph of modern science, medicine, and public health over smallpox.

On September 23, 2020, Foege sent a private letter to Centers for Disease Control and Prevention Director Robert R. Redfield urging him to acknowledge in writing that the CDC had responded poorly to COVID-19 and to set a new course for how CDC would lead the United States' response, calling the White House's approach "disastrous".

== Personal life and death ==
Foege and his wife Paula had three sons, the eldest of whom died in 2007. He has been described as a "religious man"; between 1997 and 2006 he served on the Board of Regents of Pacific Lutheran University.

Foege died from congestive heart failure in Atlanta, Georgia, on January 24, 2026, at the age of 89.

== Awards and honors ==
- Abraham Lilienfeld Award, American College of Epidemiology, 1990
- Fries Prize for Improving Health, James F. and Sarah T. Fries Foundation (formerly known as the Healthtrac Foundation), 1992
- Sedgwick Memorial Medal, American Public Health Association, 1993
- Frank A. Calderone Prize, Columbia Mailman School of Public Health, 1996
- Honorary Doctor of Science, Harvard University, 1997
- Honorary Fellow, London School of Hygiene & Tropical Medicine, beginning 1997
- Honorary Doctor of Humane Letters, Pacific Lutheran University, 2000
- Wittenberg Award, The Luther Institute, 2001
- Mary Woodard Lasker Award for Public Service, 2001
- C.-E. A. Winslow Medal, Yale University, 2004
- Thomas Francis, Jr. Medal in Global Public Health, University of Michigan, 2005
- Public Welfare Medal, United States National Academy of Sciences, 2005
- Honorary Doctor of Medical Sciences, Yale University, 2005
- Albert B. Sabin Gold Medal, Sabin Vaccine Institute, 2006
- Julius B. Richmond Award, Harvard School of Public Health, 2006
- The William H. Foege Building, named in his honor and dedicated in 2006, houses the University of Washington School of Medicine's Departments of Bioengineering and Genome Sciences.
- Jimmy and Rosalynn Carter Award for Humanitarian Contributions to the Health of Humankind, National Foundation for Infectious Diseases, 2007
- Chosen as one of "America's Best Leaders" by U.S. News & World Report, 2007
- Raymond and Beverly Sackler Award for Sustained National Leadership, Research!America, 2008
- CDC Foundation Hero Award, 2009
- Ivan Allen Jr. Prize for Social Courage, Ivan Allen College of Liberal Arts at the Georgia Institute of Technology, 2012
- Presidential Medal of Freedom, 2012
- Richard and Barbara Hansen Leadership Award, University of Iowa College of Public Health, 2014
- 2020 Future of Life Award (Smallpox Eradication)

== Selected publications ==
=== Books and book chapters ===
- Foege WH, Amler RW (1987). "Introduction and methods". In Amler RW, Dull HB (eds.). Closing the gap: the burden of unnecessary illness. New York: Oxford University Press. ISBN 0-19-505483-0. OCLC 16755579.
- Foege WH. "Foreword." In: Albert Schweitzer (1998). The primeval forest. Baltimore, Md: Johns Hopkins University Press in association with The Albert Schweitzer Institute for the Humanities. ISBN 0-8018-5958-1. OCLC 38925138.
- Ross DA, Hinman AR, Saarlas K, Foege WH (2003). "Foreword". In O'Carroll PW, et al. (eds.). Public health informatics and information systems. Berlin: Springer. pp. v–vii. ISBN 0-387-95474-0. OCLC 133157982.
- Foege WH; et al., eds. (2005). Global health leadership and management. San Francisco: Jossey-Bass. ISBN 0-7879-7153-7. OCLC 57579300.
- Foege WH (June 2011). House on Fire: The Fight to Eradicate Smallpox. University of California Press. ISBN 978-0-520-26836-4.
- Foege WH (2018). The Fears of the Rich, the Needs of the Poor: My Years at the CDC. Johns Hopkins University Press. ISBN 978-1-421-42529-0.

=== Journal articles ===
- Foege WH, Millar JD, Lane JM (October 1971). "Selective epidemiologic control in smallpox eradication". Am J Epidemiol. 94 (4): 311–5. doi:10.1093/oxfordjournals.aje.a121325. PMID 5110547.
- Foster SO, Brink EW, Hutchins DL, Pifer JM, Lourie B, Moser CR, Cummings EC, Kuteyi OE, Eke RE, Titus JB, Smith EA, Hicks JW, Foege WH (1972). "Human monkeypox". Bull World Health Organ. 46 (5): 569–76. PMC 2480784. PMID 4340216.
- Ruben FL, Smith EA, Foster SO, Casey HL, Pifer JM, Wallace RB, Atta AI, Jones WL, Arnold RB, Teller BE, Shaikh ZQ, Lourie B, Eddins DL, Doko SM, Foege WH (1973). "Simultaneous administration of smallpox, measles, yellow fever, and diphtheria—pertussis—tetanus antigens to Nigerian children". Bull World Health Organ. 48 (2): 175–81. PMC 2481001. PMID 4541683.
- Henderson RH, Davis H, Eddins DL, Foege WH (1973). "Assessment of vaccination coverage, vaccination scar rates, and smallpox scarring in five areas of West Africa". Bull World Health Organ. 48 (2): 183–94. PMC 2481004. PMID 4541684.
- Foege WH, Millar JD, Henderson DA (1975). "Smallpox eradication in West and Central Africa". Bull World Health Organ. 52 (2): 209–22. PMC 2366358. PMID 1083309.
- Ravenholt RT, Foege WH (October 1982). "1918 influenza, encephalitis lethargica, parkinsonism". Lancet. 2 (8303): 860–4. doi:10.1016/s0140-6736(82)90820-0. PMID 6126720. S2CID 45138249.
- Foege WH, Amler RW, White CC (September 1985). "Closing the gap. Report of the Carter Center Health Policy Consultation". JAMA. 254 (10): 1355–8. doi:10.1001/jama.254.10.1355. PMID 4021014.
- Hinman AR, Foege WH, de Quadros CA, Patriarca PA, Orenstein WA, Brink EW (1987). "The case for global eradication of poliomyelitis". Bull World Health Organ. 65 (6): 835–40. PMC 2491079. PMID 3501736.
- McGinnis JM, Foege WH (November 1993). "Actual causes of death in the United States". JAMA. 270 (18): 2207–12. doi:10.1001/jama.270.18.2207. PMID 8411605.
- McGinnis JM, Foege WH (March–April 1999). "Mortality and morbidity attributable to use of addictive substances in the United States". Proc Assoc Am Physicians. 111 (2): 109–18. doi:10.1046/j.1525-1381.1999.09256.x. PMID 10220805.
- Foege W (April 2002). "Keynote address: issues in overcoming iron deficiency". J Nutr. 132 (4 Suppl): 790S–3S. doi:10.1093/jn/132.4.790S. PMID 11925483.
- Foege WH (March 5, 2003). "Holding our breath". MedGenMed. 5 (1): 11. PMID 12827072.
- Foege WH (December 18, 2003). "Polio and policy options". MedGenMed. 5 (4): 34. PMID 14745381.
- McGinnis JM, Foege WH (March 2004). "The immediate vs the important". JAMA. 291 (10): 1263–4. doi:10.1001/jama.291.10.1263. PMID 15010451.
- Foege WH (Winter 2004). "Redefining public health". J Law Med Ethics. 32 (4 Suppl): 23–6. doi:10.1111/j.1748-720X.2004.tb00178.x. PMID 15807317. S2CID 22762113.
