= Icddr,b =

International health research organisation located in Dhaka

icddr,b
- আন্তর্জাতিক উদরাময় গবেষণা কেন্দ্র, বাংলাদেশ বা ইন্টারন্যাশনাল সেন্টার ফর ডাইরিয়াল ডিজিজ রিসার্চ, বাংলাদেশ
- Logo of the icddr,b
- Formation: 1960; 66 years ago
- Purpose: Diarrhoeal disease research
- Headquarters: 68, Shaheed Tajuddin Ahmed Sarani, Mohakhali, Dhaka, Bangladesh
- Coordinates: 23°46′35.04″N 90°23′59.27″E
- Executive Director: Tahmeed Ahmed
- Notable researchers: Dilip Mahalanabis; Colin Munro MacLeod; Richard A. Cash; David R. Nalin; Niyaz Ahmed; Firdausi Qadri
- Website: www.icddrb.org
- Formerly called: International Centre for Diarrhoeal Disease Research, Bangladesh; SEATO Cholera Research Laboratory

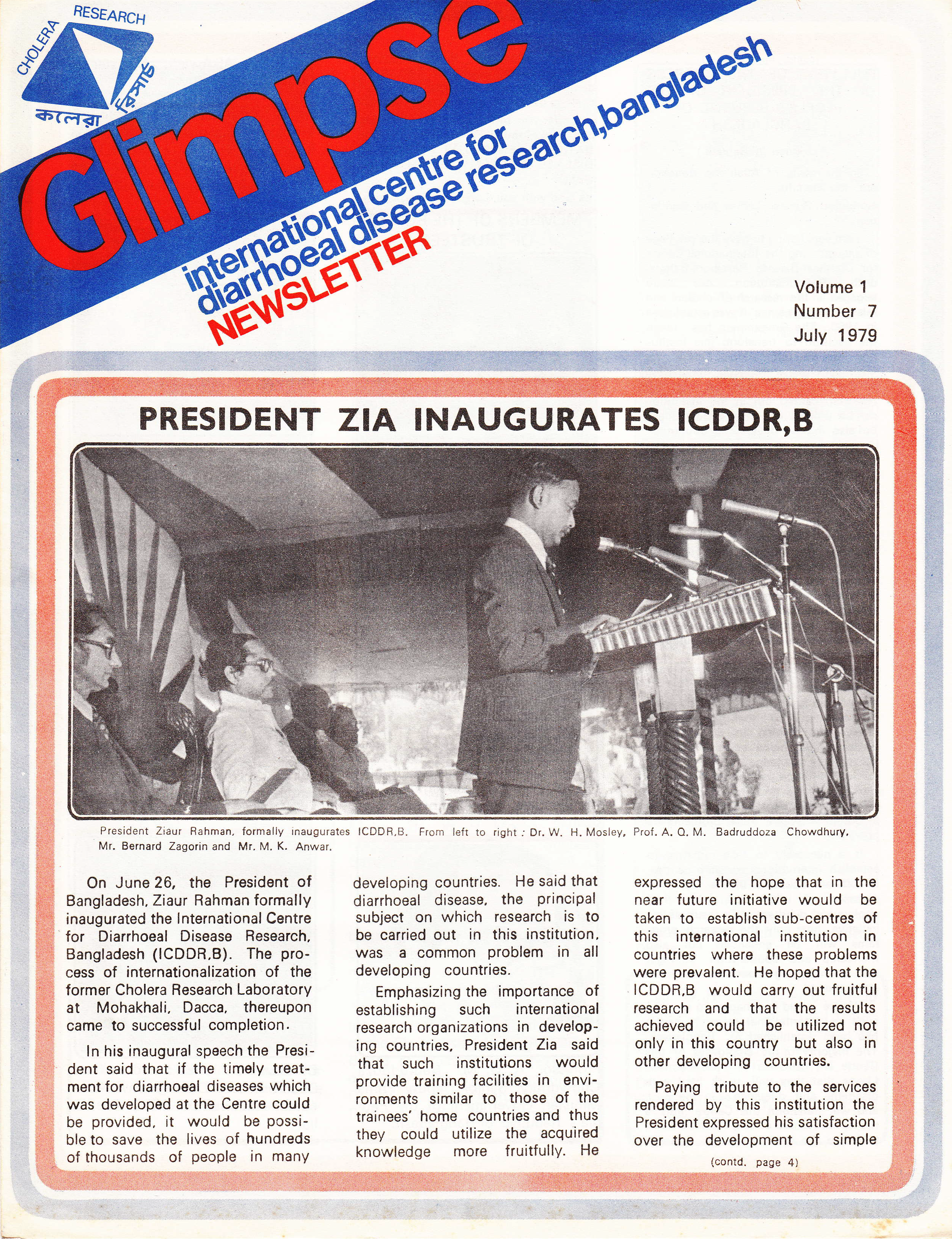
President Zia inaugurates icddr,b

icddr,b (formerly known as the International Centre for Diarrhoeal Disease Research, Bangladesh) is an international health research organisation located in Dhaka, Bangladesh. It is dedicated to saving lives through research, treatment and addresses some of the most critical health concerns facing the world today, ranging from improving neonatal survival to HIV/AIDS. In collaboration with academic and research institutions worldwide, icddr,b conducts research, training and extension activities, as well as programme-based initiatives, to develop and share knowledge for global lifesaving solutions.

icddr,b is one of the leading research institutes of the Global South, releasing, according to the Thomson Reuters Web of Science, 18 percent of the Bangladesh's publications.

icddr,b has a mix of national and international staff, including public health scientists, laboratory scientists, clinicians, nutritionists, epidemiologists, demographers, social and behavioural scientists, IT professionals, and experts in emerging and re-emerging infectious diseases, and vaccine sciences.

icddr,b is supported by about 55 donor countries and organisations, including Sweden (SIDA), Canada, UK, Bangladesh, USA, UN specialised agencies, foundations, universities, research institutes and private sector organisations and companies that share the centre's concern for the health problems of developing countries and who value its proven experience in helping solve those problems. The centre is governed by a distinguished multinational Board of Trustees comprising 17 members from all over the world.

== History ==
It has roots in the SEATO Cholera Research Laboratory formed in 1960. When Bangladesh became independent in 1971, activities were scaled down due to a scarcity of funds. Subsequently, a bilateral agreement was signed by Bangladesh and USAID for direct fund flow to the organisation. Until 1978, there were number research accomplishments such as ORS, Patho-Physiology of shigellosis, Rotavirus, uplifting family planning program etc. In 1978 proposal by an international group of scientists was put forward to elevate the organisation to an international research centre. The organisation was established in its current form via an ordinance promulgated by President Ziaur Rahman and then that was ratified in parliament in 1979. The centre has, among its other accomplishments, played a major role in the discovery and implementation of oral rehydration therapy for the treatment of diarrhoea and cholera in the 1960s. Oral rehydration therapy is thought to have saved over 50 million people worldwide.

Since 1978, the centre has trained more than 27,000 health professionals from over 78 countries. Courses provide practical training in hospital management of diarrhoeal diseases, epidemiology, biostatistics, family planning, demographic surveillance, and child survival strategies. As child deaths from disease have been reduced, deaths from injuries, such as drowning, have become a proportionately greater threat to child survival.

The Epstein files suggest that Jeffrey Epstein may have targeted icddr,b as a potential investment opportunity and possibly invested millions, but the outcomes were negative, though no direct links have been confirmed.

== Awards and recognition ==
In 2017, icddr,b won the Conrad N. Hilton Humanitarian Prize with $2 million in prize money in recognition of the institute's innovative approach to solving global health issues impacting the world's most impoverished communities. In 2016, former UN Secretary-General Ban Ki-moon noted that icddr,b innovations are directly contributing to sustainable development, helping reduce infant, child and maternal mortality significantly in Bangladesh and beyond.

In 2001, icddr,b received the first Gates Award for Global Health from the Bill & Melinda Gates Foundation. In 2002 the first Pollin Prize for Pediatric Research was awarded to Drs. Norbert Hirschhorn, Nathaniel Pierce, Dilip Mahalanabis and David Nalin for their contributions to the development and implementation of oral rehydration therapy. The work of Drs. Hirschhorn and Nalin was done at the Cholera Research Laboratory beginning in 1967. Dr. Dilip Mahalanabis made his major contribution to oral rehydration therapy in 1971 while working in Calcutta and served as Director of Clinical Research at icddr,b in the 1990s. In 2006, the Prince Mahidol Award for public health was given jointly to Drs. Mahalanabis, Richard A. Cash, David Nalin, and Stanley Schultz for their work on oral rehydration therapy. In 2007, icddr,b received the Leadership Award from the Alliance for the Prudent Use of Antibiotics.

It won the $2 million 2017 Conrad N. Hilton Humanitarian Prize from the Conrad N. Hilton Foundation.

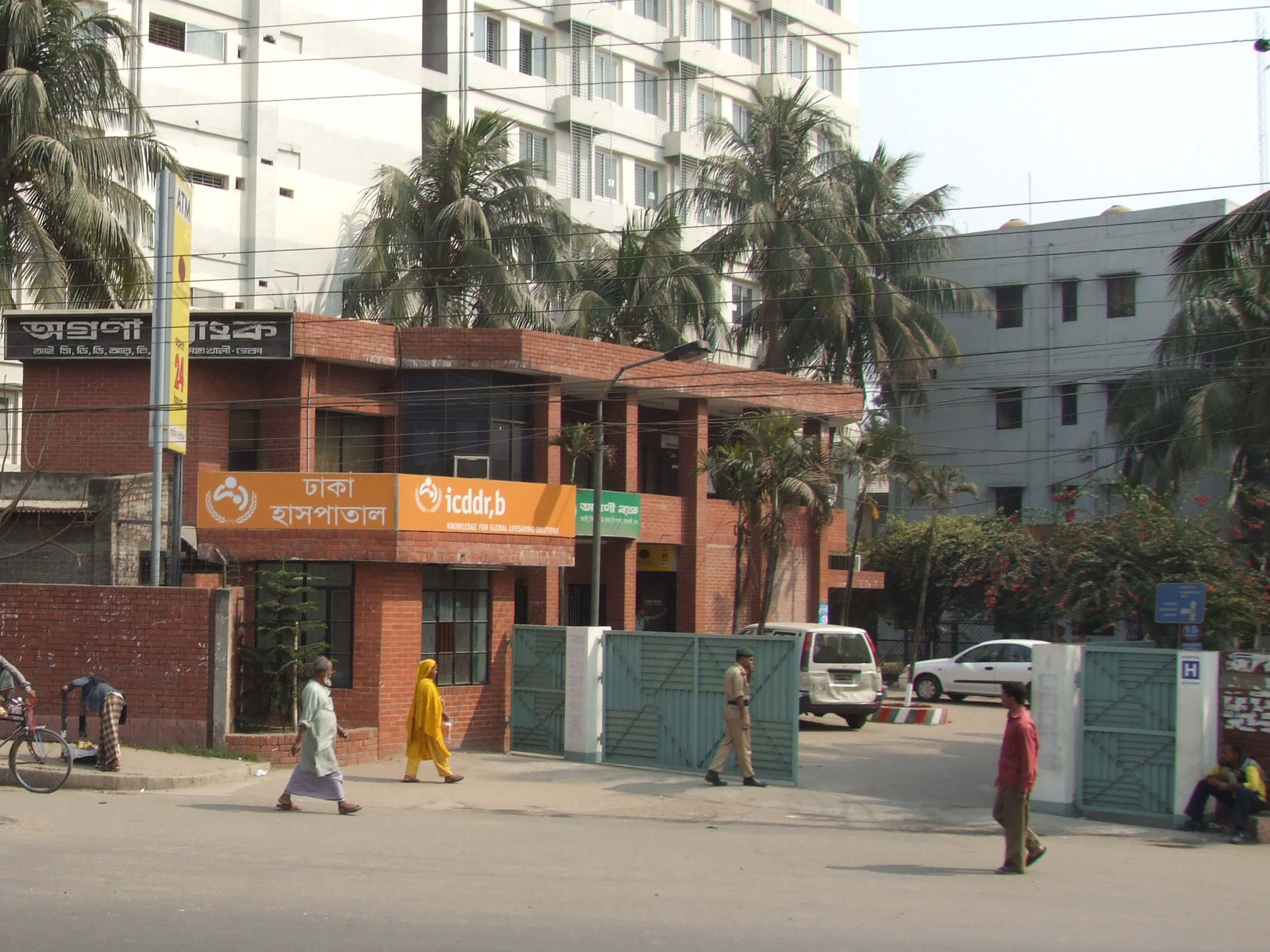
Entrance to the icddr,b head office, in Mohakhali, Dhaka.

== Timeline of innovations and achievements ==
- 1960: Cholera Research Laboratory begins.
- 1963: Population surveillance – the world's longest running field site starts in Matlab Bazaar.
- 1966: Cholera fatality reduced to less than 1%.
- 1967: Work leading to the development of oral rehydration therapy begins.
- 1969: Relationship between breastfeeding and menstruation resumption is demonstrated.
- 1974: Tetanus toxoid vaccine recommended for pregnant women, reducing neonatal mortality by 30%.
- 1978: Rotavirus identified as the most common cause of diarrhoea in infants in Bangladesh, and as highest priority for new vaccines.
- 1982: Rice-based ORS shown to be fully effective alternative to glucose-based ORS and preferred for routine use at icddr,b.
- 1982: Matlab Maternal Child Health and Family Planning project shares its success in lowering national fertility rates with the Government of Bangladesh.
- 1983: Epidemic Control and Preparedness Programme begins.
- 1984: Full Expanded Programme on Immunization data is validated (and begins). Benefit of measles vaccine demonstrated, leading to inclusion in EPI.
- 1985: Cholera vaccine trial launched.
- 1988: Treatment of, and research into, acute respiratory infections/pneumonia begins.
- 1989: Matlab record keeping system, specially adapted for Government use, extended to the national family planning programme.
- 1993: New Vibrio cholerae 0139 (Bengal strain) identified and characterised by icddr,b.
- 1994: icddr,b epidemic response team goes to Goma, Zaire to assist cholera-stricken Rwandan refugees and helps reduce case fatality rate from as high as 49% to less than 1%.
- 1995: Maternal immunisation with pneumococcal vaccine shown likely to protect infants up to 22 weeks.
- 1998: HIV sero-surveillance begins in Bangladesh on behalf of Ministry of Health and Family Welfare, Government of Bangladesh.
- 1999: Protocolized Management of Severely Malnourished Children decreases case fatality from 20% to less than 5%. Published in Lancet.
- 2000: icddr,b assists Government of Bangladesh with control of major dengue epidemic in Dhaka.
- 2000: International, peer-reviewed and indexed icddr,b journal is renamed Journal of Health, Population, and Nutrition.
- 2001: Studies on violence against women in Bangladesh are initiated.
- 2001: icddr,b opens the first tuberculosis laboratory in Bangladesh.
- 2001: Oral cholera vaccine, tested at icddr,b, is approved for use by WHO.
- 2001: Studies on the effects of arsenic on health begin.
- 2002: icddr,b studies establish that zinc treatment of diarrhoea reduces under-5 mortality by 50%.
- 2002: First HIV voluntary counselling and testing unit in Bangladesh opens at icddr,b.
- 2003: New research programmes on HIV/AIDS and Poverty & Health.
- 2004: Studies on preventing high levels of childhood drowning begin.
- 2005: icddr,b team assists in post-tsunami health needs assessment in Sri Lanka.
- 2006: Dispersible zinc tablets launched through unique public-private partnership in national scale-up to treat diarrhoea in children under five years.
- 2006: Studies on abortion and menstrual regulation initiated.
- 2007: Oral cholera vaccine Dukoral, tested at Matlab in 1985, launched in Bangladesh.
- 2008: Introduce SHEBA (an integrated Hospital Management System) and start the journey as a paperless hospital
- 2009: icddr,b opens a ward for ARI (Swine Flu) patients.
- 2010: icddr,b celebrates 50 years of operations. Sends teams to combat deadly cholera outbreaks in Pakistan and Haiti. Research team discovers and characterise the "TLC phage" which changes the chromosomal sequence of the cholera bacterium, enabling incoming toxigenic CTX phage genome to be incorporated and transforming a harmless strain of V. cholerae to a dangerous killer. Issued its first patent from the Director of United States Patent and Trademark Office (United States Patent US7638271) for inventing a new diagnostic method for tuberculosis, called Antibodies from lymphocyte secretions or ALS.
- 2011: "Continuum of Care" (a concept involving a system that guides and tracks patients over time through a comprehensive array of health services) approach achieves 36% drop in perinatalmortality.
- 2014: Oral cholera vaccine in Bangladesh was found to have significant impact on cholera incidence when delivered through Bangladesh's existing immunisation infrastructure.
- 2015: icddr,b published a three-year strategic plan 2015–2018, aiming to achieve broader objectives by developing a greater international focus, promoting the growth of South-South collaborations and increasing engagement with the private sector.
- 2016: Former UN Secretary-General Ban Ki-moon acknowledged that icddr,b interventions are directly contributing to sustainable development, which helped to significantly reduce infant, child and maternal mortality in Bangladesh and beyond.
- 2017: icddr,b wins the 2017 Conrad N. Hilton Humanitarian Prize for its commitment to solving key public health problems facing the world's most vulnerable through innovative scientific research since 1960.

== Facilities ==
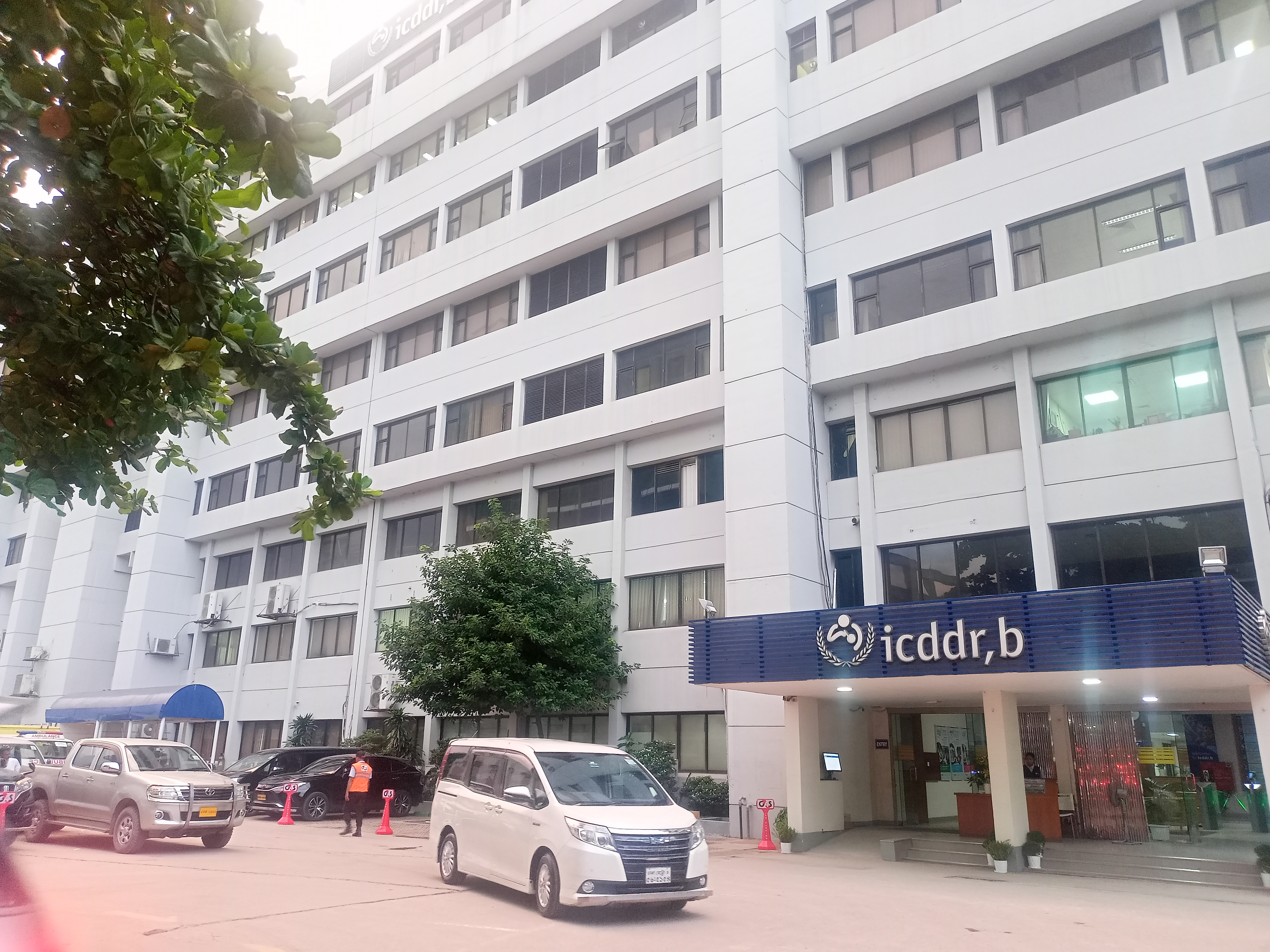
icddr,b main building

The headquarters is in Dhaka located at Mohakhali with modern laboratories and hospital, and training centers. Dhaka Hospital was established by icddr,b in 1962 primarily for diarrhoeal disease. It has since grown into a nationally important centre treating more than 140,000 patients a year. Dhaka Hospital provides an infrastructure for a wide range of clinical research projects. It has pioneered numerous innovations, including a paperless patient record system, which has also been adopted at Matlab Hospital. The Matlab Hospital is located within the Health and Demographic Surveillance Site at Matlab, about 50 kilometres (31 mi) south of Dhaka. It has 120-bed which provide free clinical care for diarrhoeal disease, maternal and child health care services, treating more than 30,000 people a year. It played a key role in community trials of oral rehydration solution and early cholera vaccine studies.
