= Oral rehydration therapy =

Type of fluid replacement used to prevent and treat dehydration

- An oral rehydration solution (250ml) prepared according to WHO formula.
- Other names: oral rehydration solution (ORS), oral rehydration salts (ORS), glucose-salt solution

Oral rehydration therapy (ORT) is a type of fluid replacement used to prevent and treat dehydration, especially due to diarrhea. It involves drinking water with modest amounts of sugar and salts, specifically sodium and potassium. Oral rehydration therapy can also be given by a nasogastric tube. Therapy can include the use of zinc supplements to reduce the duration of diarrhea in infants and children under the age of 5. Use of oral rehydration therapy has been estimated to decrease the risk of death from diarrhea by up to 93%.

Side effects may include vomiting, high blood sodium, or high blood potassium. If vomiting occurs, it is recommended that use be paused for 10 minutes and then gradually restarted. The recommended formulation includes sodium chloride, sodium citrate, potassium chloride, and glucose. Glucose may be replaced by sucrose and sodium citrate may be replaced by sodium bicarbonate, if not available, although the resulting mixture is not shelf stable in high-humidity environments. It works as glucose increases the uptake of sodium and thus water by the intestines, and the potassium chloride and sodium citrate help prevent hypokalemia and acidosis, respectively, which are both common side effects of diarrhea. A number of other formulations are also available including versions that can be made at home. However, the use of homemade solutions has not been well studied.

Oral rehydration therapy was developed in the 1940s using electrolyte solutions with or without glucose on an empirical basis chiefly for mild or convalescent patients, but did not come into common use for rehydration and maintenance therapy until after the discovery that glucose promoted sodium and water absorption during cholera in the 1960s. It is on the World Health Organization's List of Essential Medicines. Globally, as of 2015, oral rehydration therapy is used by 41% of children with diarrhea. This use has played an important role in reducing the number of deaths in children under the age of five.

== Medical uses ==
Share of children with diarrhea receiving oral rehydration salts and zinc

ORT is less invasive than the other strategies for fluid replacement, specifically intravenous (IV) fluid replacement. Mild to moderate dehydration in children seen in an emergency department is best treated with ORT. Persons taking ORT should eat within six hours and return to their full diet within 24–48 hours.

Oral rehydration therapy may also be used as a treatment for the symptoms of dehydration and rehydration in burns in resource-limited settings.

=== Efficacy ===
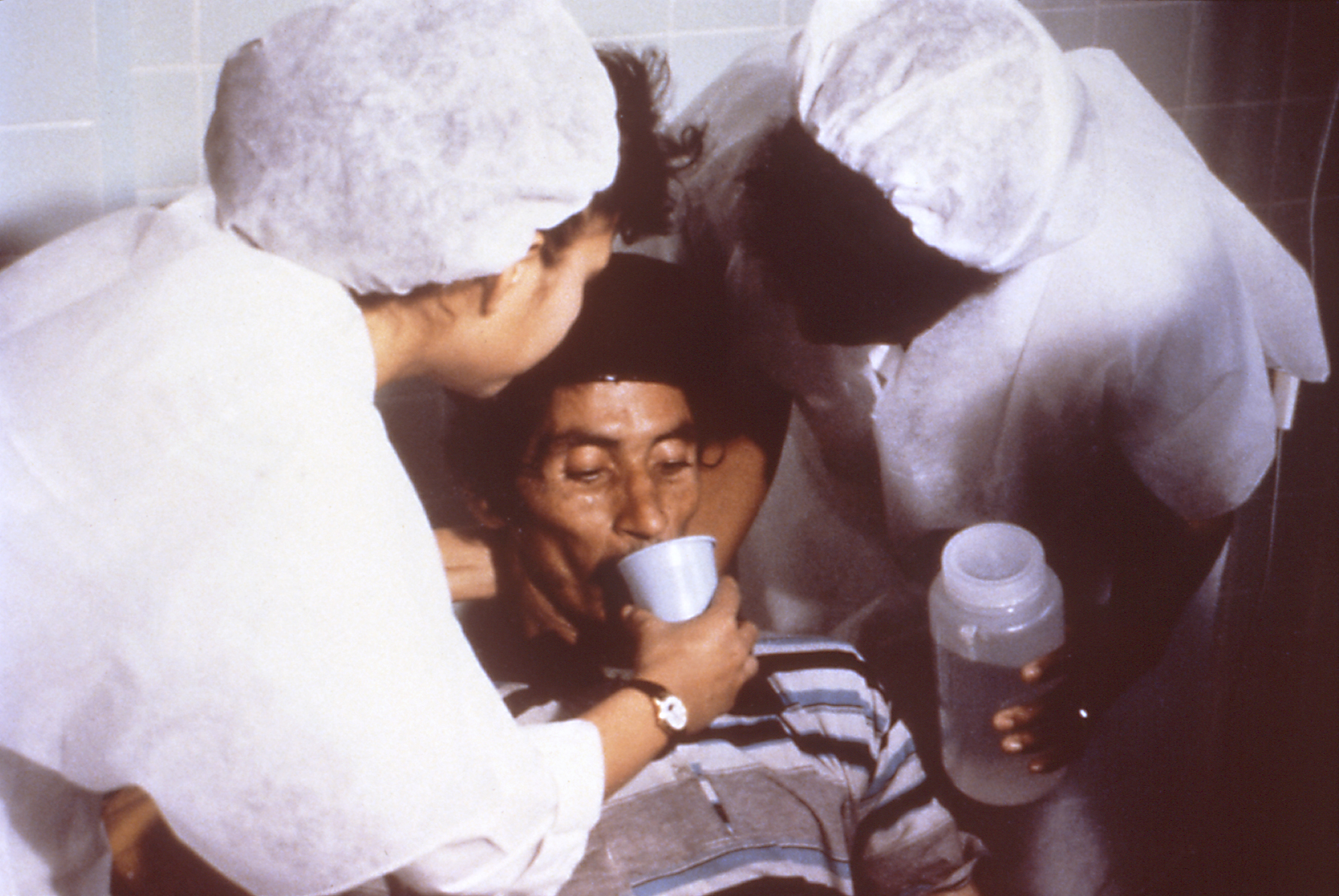
A person with cholera drinking oral rehydration solution (ORS)

ORT may lower the mortality rate of diarrhea by as much as 93%. Case studies in four developing countries also have demonstrated an association between increased use of ORS and reduction in mortality. ORT using the original ORS formula has no effect on the duration of the diarrheic episode or the volume of fluid loss, although reduced osmolarity solutions have been shown to reduce stool volume.

=== Treatment algorithm ===
The degree of dehydration should be assessed before initiating ORT. ORT is suitable for people who are not dehydrated and those who show signs and symptoms of mild to moderate dehydration. People who have severe dehydration should seek professional medical help immediately and receive intravenous rehydration as soon as possible to rapidly replenish fluid volume in the body.

== Contraindications ==
ORT should be discontinued and fluids replaced intravenously when vomiting is protracted despite proper administration of ORT; or signs of dehydration worsen despite giving ORT; or the person is unable to drink due to a decreased level of consciousness; or there is evidence of intestinal blockage or ileus. ORT might also be contraindicated in people who are in hemodynamic shock due to impaired airway protective reflexes. Short-term vomiting is not a contraindication to receiving oral rehydration therapy. In persons who are vomiting, drinking oral rehydration solution at a slow and continuous pace will help resolve vomiting.

== Preparation ==
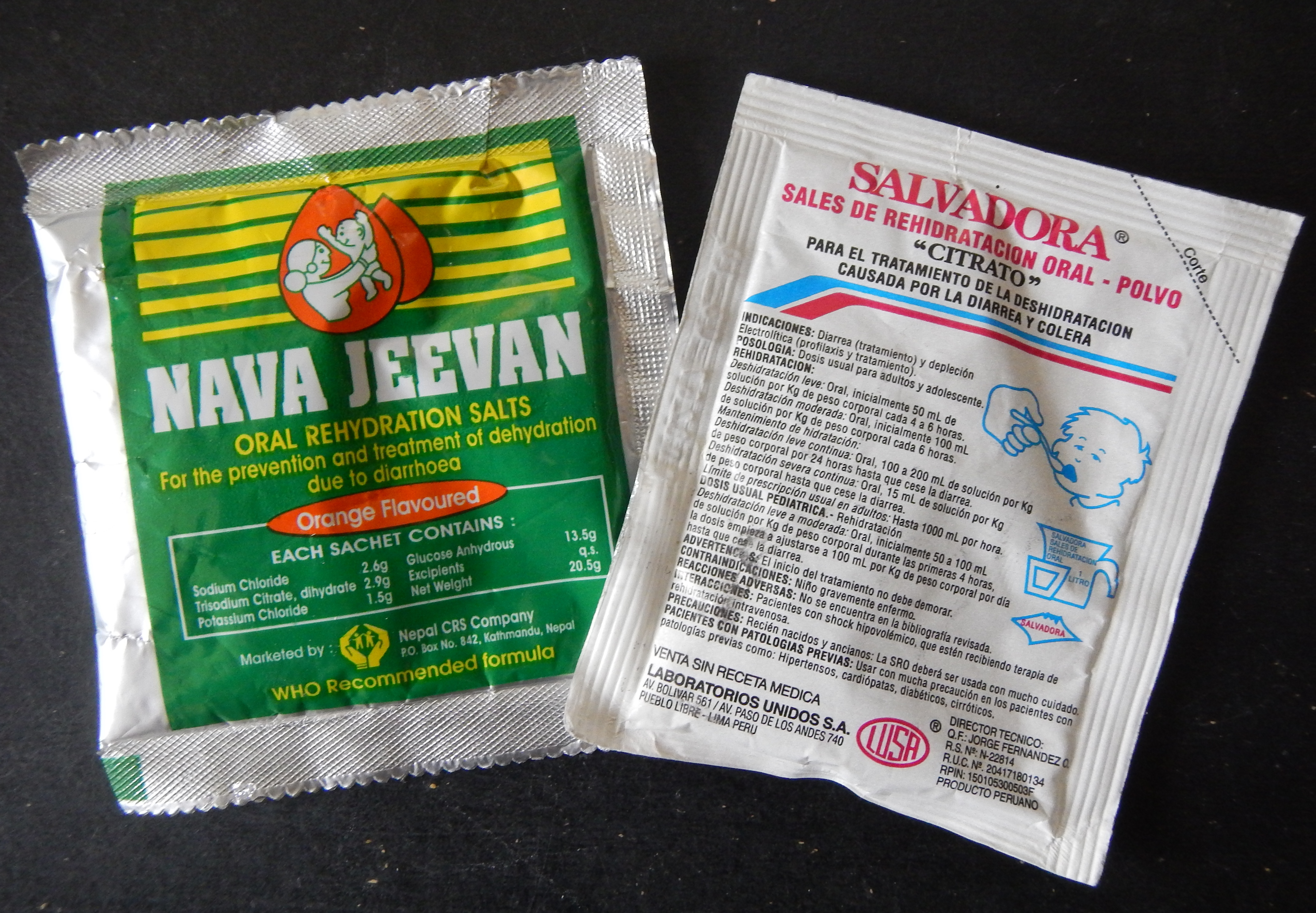
Commercially available oral rehydration salts: left, from Nepal; right, from Peru.

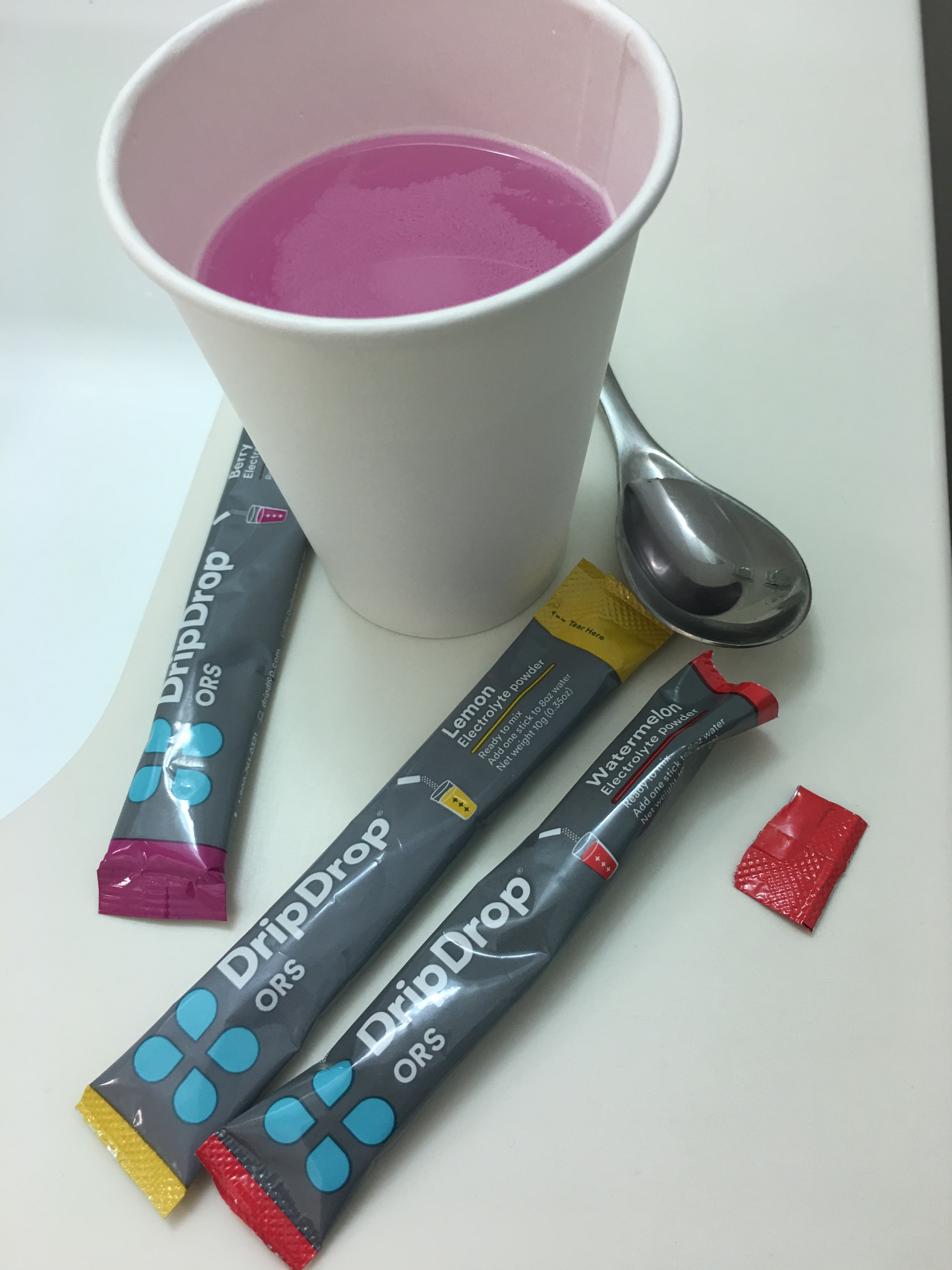
Commercially available ORS in water.

WHO and UNICEF have jointly developed official guidelines for the manufacture of oral rehydration solution and the oral rehydration salts used to make it (both often abbreviated ORS). They also describe other acceptable solutions, depending on material availability. Commercial preparations are available as prepared fluids and as packets of powder ready to mix with water.

A basic oral rehydration therapy solution can also be prepared when packets of oral rehydration salts are not available. The molar ratio of sugar to salt should be 1:1 and the solution should not be hyperosmolar. The Rehydration Project states, "Making the mixture a little diluted (with more than 1 litre of clean water) is not harmful."

The optimal fluid for preparing oral rehydration solution is clean water. However, if this is not available, the usually available water should be used. Oral rehydration solution should not be withheld simply because the available water is potentially unsafe; rehydration takes precedence.

When oral rehydration salts packets and suitable teaspoons for measuring sugar and salt are not available, the WHO has recommended that homemade gruels, soups, etc., may be considered to help maintain hydration. A Lancet review in 2013 emphasized the need for more research on appropriate home made fluids to prevent dehydration. Sports drinks are not optimal oral rehydration solutions, but they can be used if optimal choices are not available. They should not be withheld for lack of better options; again, rehydration takes precedence. But they are not replacements for oral rehydration solutions in nonemergency situations.

=== Reduced-osmolarity ===
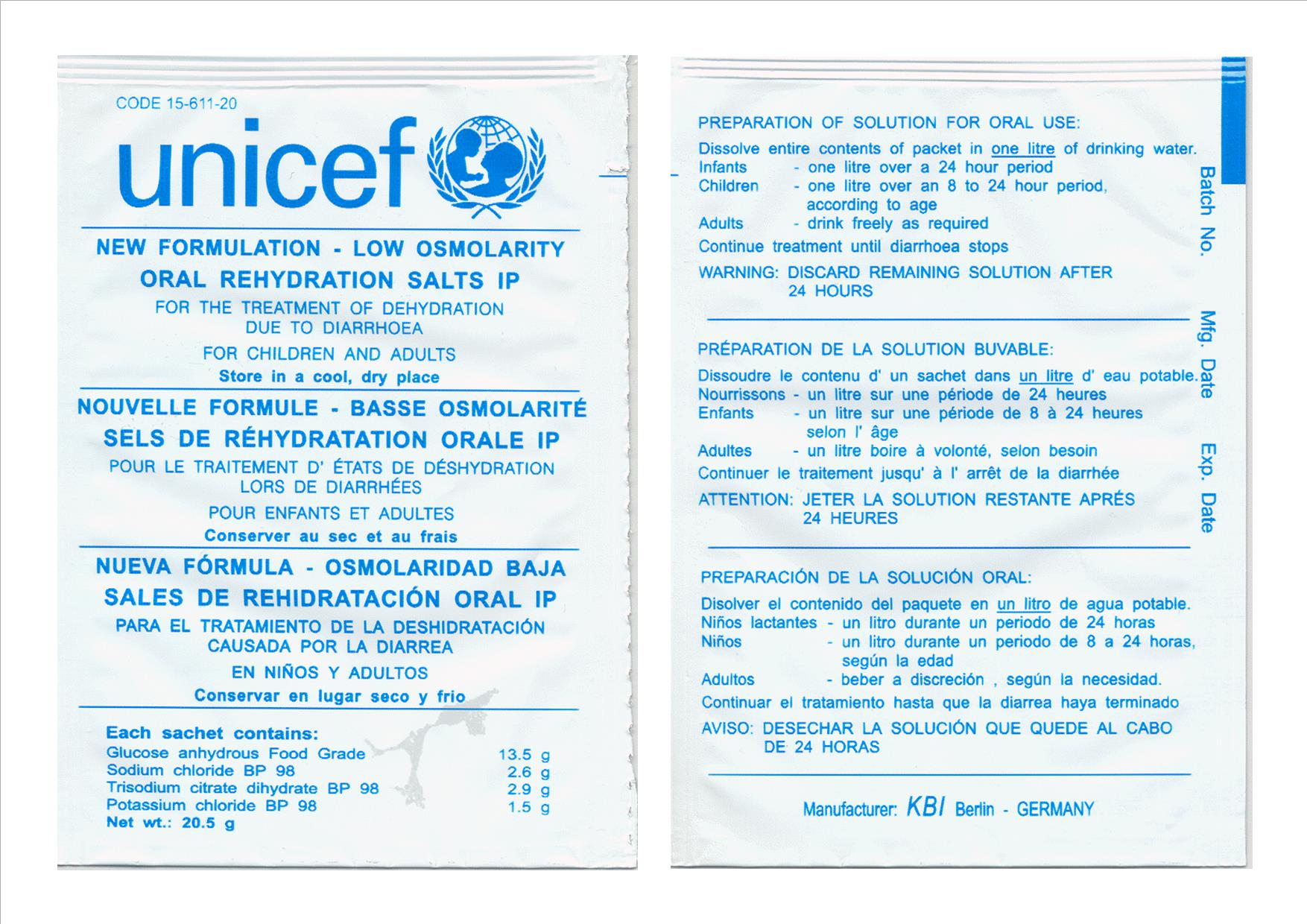
UNICEF-WHO Oral Rehydration Salt (ORS) packet

In 2003, WHO and UNICEF recommended that the osmolarity of oral rehydration solution be reduced from 311 to 245 mOsm/L. These guidelines were also updated in 2006. This recommendation was based on multiple clinical trials showing that the reduced osmolarity solution reduces stool volume in children with diarrhea by about twenty-five percent and the need for IV therapy by about thirty percent when compared to standard oral rehydration solution. The incidence of vomiting is also reduced. The reduced osmolarity oral rehydration solution has lower concentrations of glucose and sodium chloride than the original solution, but the concentrations of potassium and citrate are unchanged.

The reduced osmolarity solution has been criticized by some for not providing enough sodium for adults with cholera. Clinical trials have, however, shown reduced osmolarity solution to be effective for adults and children with cholera. They seem to be safe but some caution is warranted according to the Cochrane review.

Formula for the WHO standard and low-osmolar-oral rehydration solution
Component	Standard		Low-osmolar	
Component	g/L	oz/L	g/L	oz/L
NaCl (salt)	3.5	0.123	2.6	0.092
Trisodium citrate dihydrate	2.9	0.100	2.9	0.100
KCl (NoSalt)	1.5	0.053	1.5	0.053
Anhydrous glucose	20	0.705	13.5	0.480
Total	27.9	0.981	20.5	0.725

Molar composition for the WHO standard and low-osmolar-oral rehydration solution
Component	Standard	Low-osmolar	Acceptable range
Component	mmol/L	mmol/L	mmol/L
Glucose	111	75	<111
Sodium	90	75	60–90
Potassium	20	20	15–25
Chloride	80	65	50–80
Citrate	10	10	8–12
Total	311	245	200–310

== Administration ==
ORT is based on evidence that water continues to be absorbed from the gastrointestinal tract even while fluid is lost through diarrhea or vomiting. The World Health Organization specify indications, preparations and procedures for ORT.

WHO/UNICEF guidelines suggest ORT should begin at the first sign of diarrhea in order to prevent dehydration. Babies may be given ORS with a dropper or a syringe. Infants under two may be given a teaspoon of ORS fluid every one to two minutes. Older children and adults should take frequent sips from a cup, with a recommended intake of 200–400 mL of solution after every loose movement. The WHO recommends giving children under two a quarter- to a half-cup of fluid following each loose bowel movement and older children a half- to a full cup. If the person vomits, the caregiver should wait 5–10 minutes and then resume giving ORS. ORS may be given by aid workers or health care workers in refugee camps, health clinics and hospital settings. Mothers should remain with their children and be taught how to give ORS. This will help to prepare them to give ORT at home in the future. Breastfeeding should be continued throughout ORT.

== Associated therapies ==
=== Zinc ===
As part of oral rehydration therapy, the WHO recommends supplemental zinc (10 to 20 mg daily) for ten to fourteen days, to reduce the severity and duration of the illness and make recurrent illness in the following two to three months less likely. Preparations are available as a zinc sulfate solution for adults, a modified solution for children and in tablet form.

=== Feeding ===
After severe dehydration is corrected and appetite returns, feeding the person speeds the recovery of normal intestinal function, minimizes weight loss and supports continued growth in children. Small frequent meals are best tolerated (offering the child food every three to four hours). Mothers should continue to breastfeed. A child with watery diarrhea typically regains their appetite as soon as dehydration is corrected, whereas a child with bloody diarrhea often eats poorly until the illness resolves. Such children should be encouraged to resume normal feeding as soon as possible. Once diarrhea is corrected, the WHO recommends giving the child an extra meal each day for two weeks, and longer if the child is malnourished.

=== Children with malnutrition ===
Dehydration may be overestimated in wasted children and underestimated in edematous children. Care of these children must also include careful management of their malnutrition and treatment of other infections. Useful signs of dehydration include an eagerness to drink, lethargy, cool and moist extremities, weak or absent radial pulse (wrist), and reduced or absent urine flow. In children with severe malnutrition, it is often impossible to reliably distinguish between moderate and severe dehydration. A severely malnourished child who has signs of severe dehydration but who does not have a history of watery diarrhea should be treated for septic shock.

The original ORS (90 mmol sodium/L) and the current standard reduced-osmolarity ORS (75 mmol sodium/L) both contain too much sodium and too little potassium for severely malnourished children with dehydration due to diarrhea. ReSoMal (Rehydration Solution for Malnutrition) is recommended for such children. It contains less sodium (45 mmol/L) and more potassium (40 mmol/L) than reduced osmolarity ORS. It can be obtained in packets produced by UNICEF or other manufacturers.

An exception is if the severely malnourished child also has severe diarrhea (in which case ReSoMal may not provide enough sodium), in which case standard reduced-osmolarity ORS (75 mmol sodium/L) is recommended. Malnourished children should be rehydrated slowly. The WHO recommends 10 milliliters of ReSoMal per kilogram body weight for each of the first two hours (for example, a 9-kilogram child should be given 90 mL of ReSoMal over the course of the first hour, and another 90 mL for the second hour) and then continuing at this same rate or slower based on the child's thirst and ongoing stool losses, keeping in mind that a severely dehydrated child may be lethargic. If the child drinks poorly, a nasogastric tube should be used. The IV route should not be used for rehydration except in cases of shock and then only with care, infusing slowly to avoid flooding the circulation and overloading the heart.

Feeding should usually resume within 2–3 hours after starting rehydration and should continue every 2–3 hours, day and night. For an initial cereal diet before a child regains his or her full appetite, the WHO recommends combining 25 grams skimmed milk powder, 20 grams vegetable oil, 60 grams sugar, and 60 grams rice powder or other cereal into 1,000 milliliters water and boiling gently for five minutes. Give 130 mL per kilogram of body weight during per 24 hours. A child who cannot or will not eat this minimum amount should be given the diet by nasogastric tube divided into six equal feedings. Later on, the child should be given cereal made with a greater amount of skimmed milk product and vegetable oil and slightly less sugar. As appetite fully returns, the child should be eating 200 mL per kilogram of body weight per day. Zinc, potassium, vitamin A, and other vitamins and minerals should be added to both recommended cereal products, or to the oral rehydration solution itself. Children who are breastfed should continue breastfeeding.

=== Antibiotics ===
The WHO recommends that all severely malnourished children admitted to hospital should receive broad-spectrum antibiotics (for example, gentamicin and ampicillin). In addition, hospitalized children should be checked daily for other specific infections.

If cholera is suspected give an antibiotic to which V. cholerae are susceptible. This reduces the volume loss due to diarrhea by 50% and shortens the duration of diarrhea to about 48 hours.

== Physiological basis ==
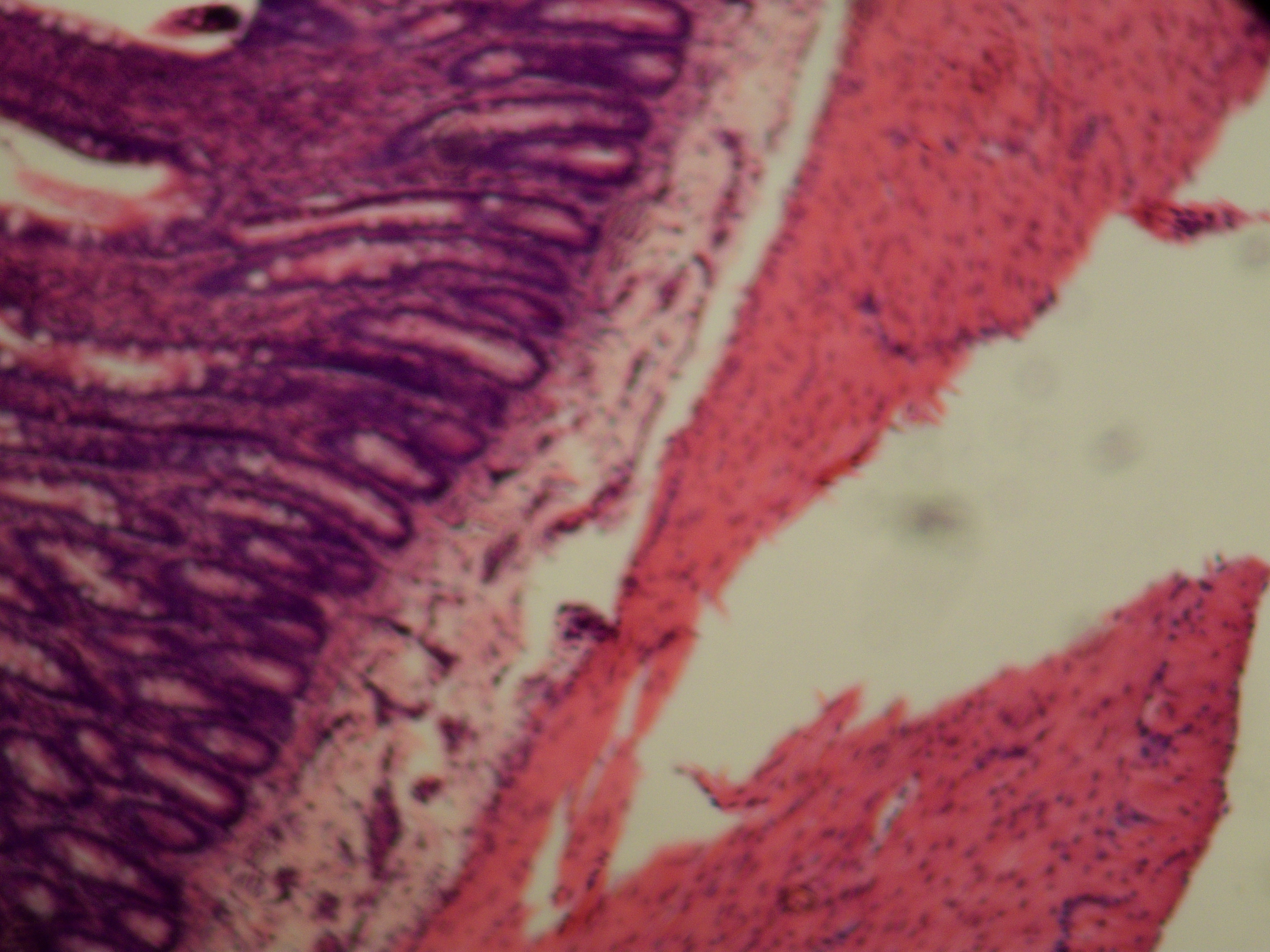
Intestinal epithelium (H&E stain)

Fluid from the body enters the intestinal lumen during digestion. This fluid is isosmotic with the blood and contains a high quantity, about 142 mEq/L, of sodium. A healthy individual secretes 2000–3000 milligrams of sodium per day into the intestinal lumen. Nearly all of this is reabsorbed so that sodium levels in the body remain constant. In a diarrheal illness, sodium-rich intestinal secretions are lost before they can be reabsorbed. This can lead to life-threatening dehydration or electrolyte imbalances within hours when fluid loss is severe. The objective of therapy is the replenishment of sodium and water losses by ORT or intravenous infusion.

Sodium absorption occurs in two stages. The first is via intestinal epithelial cells (enterocytes). Sodium passes into these cells by co-transport with glucose, via the SGLT1 protein. From the intestinal epithelial cells, sodium is pumped by active transport via the sodium-potassium pump through the basolateral cell membrane into the extracellular space.

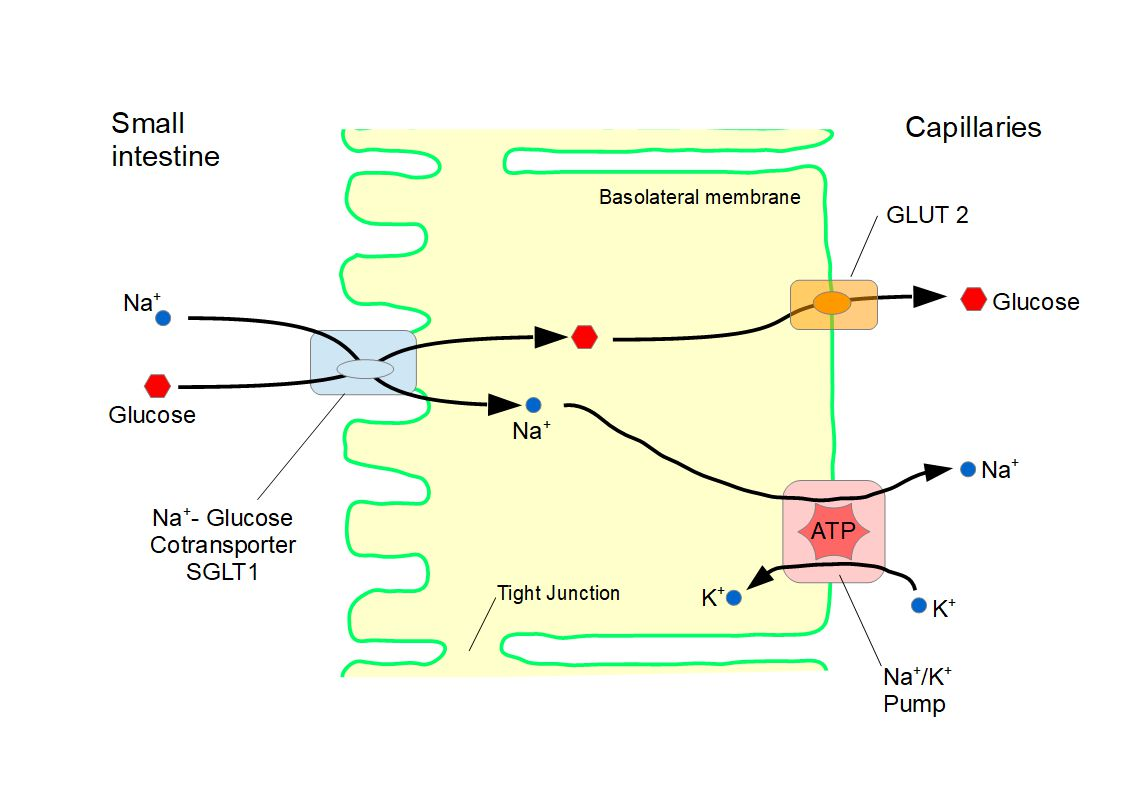

The sodium–potassium ATPase pump at the basolateral cell membrane moves three sodium ions into the extracellular space, while pulling into the enterocyte two potassium ions. This creates a "downhill" sodium gradient within the cell. SGLT proteins use energy from this downhill sodium gradient to transport glucose across the apical membrane of the cell against the glucose gradient. The co-transporters are examples of secondary active transport. The GLUT uniporters then transport glucose across the basolateral membrane. Both SGLT1 and SGLT2 are known as symporters, since both sodium and glucose are transported in the same direction across the membrane.

The co-transport of glucose into epithelial cells via the SGLT1 protein requires sodium. Two sodium ions and one molecule of glucose (or galactose) are transported together across the cell membrane via the SGLT1 protein. Without glucose, intestinal sodium is not absorbed. This is why oral rehydration salts include both sodium and glucose. For each cycle of the transport, hundreds of water molecules move into the epithelial cell to maintain osmotic equilibrium. The resultant absorption of sodium and water can achieve rehydration even while diarrhea continues.

== History ==
=== Definition ===
In the early 1980s, "oral rehydration therapy" meant only the preparation prescribed by the World Health Organization (WHO) and UNICEF. In 1988, the definition was changed to include recommended home-made solutions, because the official preparation was not always available. The definition was also amended in 1988, to include continued feeding as associated therapy. In 1991, the definition became "an increase in administered hydrational fluids"; in 1993, "an increase in administered fluids and continued feeding".

=== Development ===
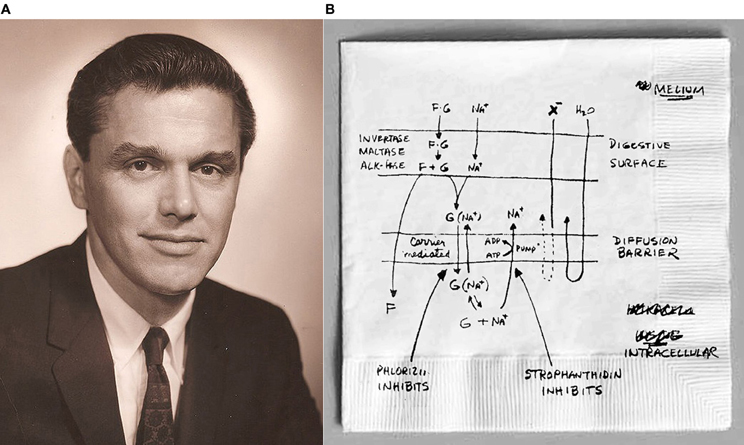
Crane and his sketch of the sodium-glucose symporter

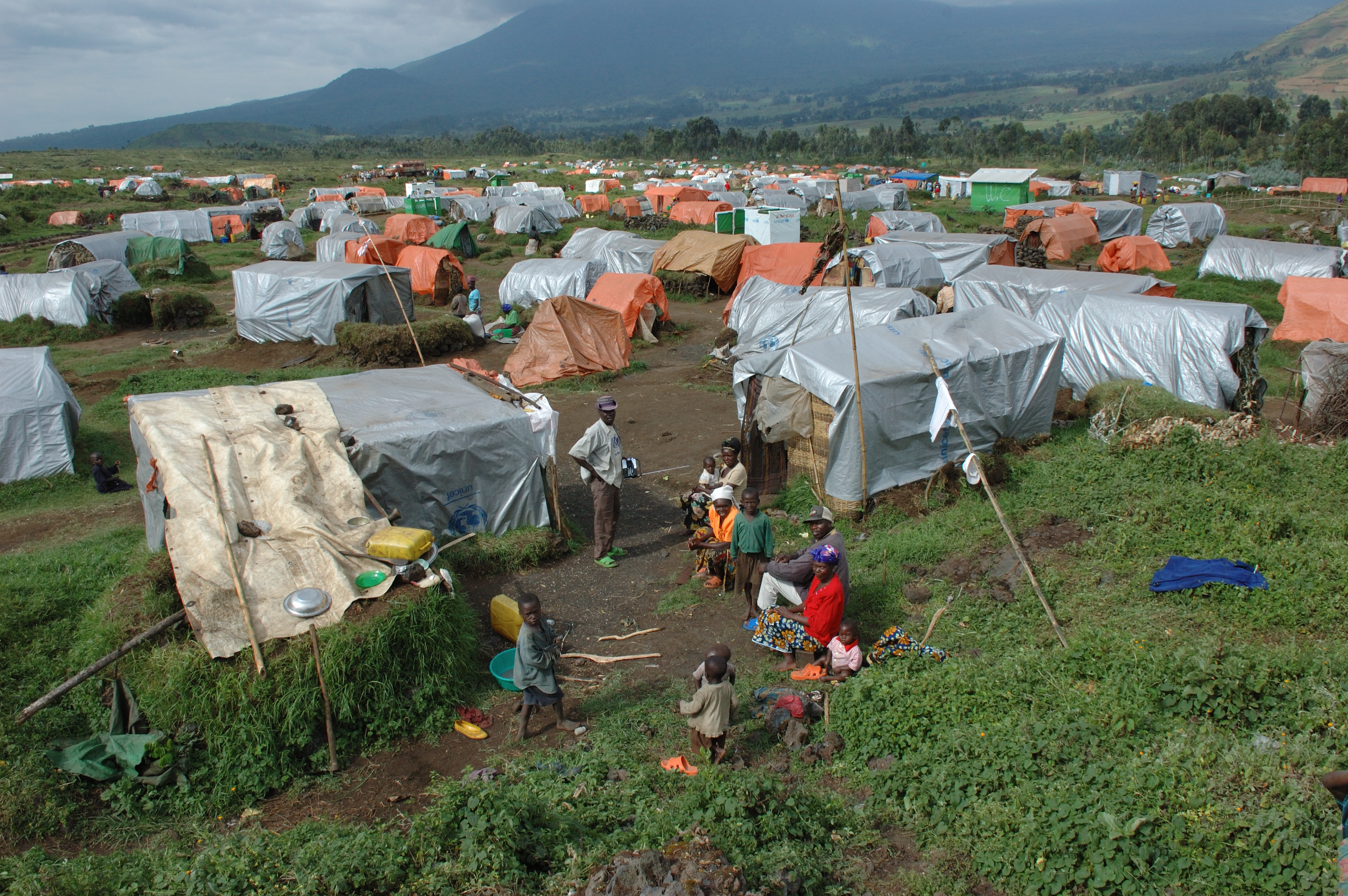
Refugee camp near Goma

In 1953, Hemendra Nath Chatterjee published in The Lancet the results of using ORS to treat people with mild cholera. According to his paper, he treated 186 patients with his oral glucose-sodium electrolyte solution and rehydrated all his patients with mild to moderately severe cholera. He gave the solution orally and rectally, along with Coleus extract, antihistamines, and antiemetics, without controls. The formula of the fluid replacement solution was 4 g of sodium chloride, 25 g of glucose, and 1000 mL of water.

Robert Allan Phillips tried to make an effective ORT solution based on his discovery that, in the presence of glucose, sodium, and chloride could be absorbed in patients with cholera; but he failed because his solution was too hypertonic and he used it to try to stop the diarrhea rather than to rehydrate patients.

In the early 1960s, Robert K. Crane described the sodium-glucose co-transport mechanism and its role in intestinal glucose absorption. This, along with evidence that the intestinal mucosa appears undamaged in cholera, suggested that intestinal absorption of glucose and sodium might continue during the illness. This supported the notion that oral rehydration might be possible even during severe diarrhea due to cholera. In 1967–1968, Norbert Hirschhorn and Nathaniel F. Pierce showed that people with severe cholera can absorb glucose, salt, and water and that this can occur in sufficient amounts to maintain hydration. In 1968, David R. Nalin and Richard A. Cash, helped by Rafiqul Islam and Majid Molla, reported that giving adults with cholera an oral glucose-electrolyte solution in volumes equal to those of the diarrhea losses reduced the need for IV fluid therapy by eighty percent.[46]

In 1971, fighting during the Bangladesh Liberation War displaced millions and an epidemic of cholera ensued among the refugees. When IV fluid ran out in the refugee camps, Dilip Mahalanabis, a physician working with the Johns Hopkins International Center for Medical Research and Training in Calcutta, issued instructions to prepare an oral rehydration solution and to distribute it to family members and caregivers. Over 3,000 people with cholera received ORT in this way. The mortality rate was 3.6% among those given ORT, compared with 30% in those given IV fluid therapy. After Bangladesh won independence, there was a wide campaign to promote the use of saline in the treatment of diarrhea. In 1980, the World Health Organization recognized ORT and began a global program for its dissemination.

Norbert Hirschhorn used oral rehydration therapy on the White River Apache Indian Reservation. He observed that children voluntarily drank as much of the solution as needed to restore hydration, and that rehydration and early re-feeding would protect their nutrition. This led to increased use of ORT for children with diarrhea, especially in developing countries.

In 1980, the Bangladeshi nonprofit BRAC created a door-to-door and person-to-person sales force to teach ORT for use by mothers at home. A task force of fourteen women, one cook, and one male supervisor traveled from village to village. After visiting with women in several villages, they hit upon the idea of encouraging the women in the village to make their own oral rehydration fluid. They used available household equipment, starting with a "half a seer" (half a quart) of water and adding a fistful of sugar and a three-finger pinch of salt. Later on, the approach was broadcast over television and radio, and a market for oral rehydration salts packets developed. Three decades later, national surveys have found that almost 90% of children with severe diarrhea in Bangladesh are given oral rehydration fluids at home or in a health facility. ORT is known in Bangladesh as Orosaline or Orsaline.

From 2006 to 2011, UNICEF estimated that worldwide about a third of children under 5 who had diarrhea received an oral rehydration solution, with estimates ranging from 30% to 41% depending on the region.

ORT is one of the principal elements of the UNICEF "GOBI FFF" program (growth monitoring; ORT; breast feeding; immunization; female education; family spacing and food supplementation). The program aims to increase child survival in developing nations through proven low-cost interventions.

== Awards ==
- Centre for Health and Population Research, Dhaka, Bangladesh, 2001 Gates award for global health.
- Norbert Hirschhorn, Dilip Mahalanabis, David Nalin, and Nathaniel Pierce, 2002 inaugural Pollin Prize for Pediatric Research.
- Richard A. Cash, David Nalin, Dilip Mahalanabis and Stanley Schultz, 2006 Prince Mahidol Award.
