= Dilip Mahalanabis =

Indian paediatrician (1934–2022)

Padma Bhushan Dilip Mahalanabis
- Born: 12 November 1934; Kishoreganj, Bengal Province, British India
- Died: 16 October 2022 (aged 87); Kolkata, West Bengal, India
- Education: MBBS, DCH, MRCP (Edinburgh)
- Alma mater: Medical College and Hospital, Kolkata
- Known for: Development of oral rehydration solution
- Awards: Pollin Prize (2002); Prince Mahidol Award (2006); Padma Vibhushan (posthumous, 2023)

Dilip Mahalanabis (12 November 1934 – 16 October 2022) was an Indian paediatrician known for pioneering the use of oral rehydration therapy to treat diarrhoeal diseases. Mahalanabis had begun researching oral rehydration therapy in 1966 as a research investigator for the Johns Hopkins University International Center for Medical Research and Training in Calcutta, India. During the Bangladeshi war for independence, he led the effort by the Johns Hopkins Center that demonstrated the dramatic life-saving effectiveness of oral rehydration therapy when cholera broke out in 1971 among refugees from East Bengal (now Bangladesh) who had sought asylum in West Bengal. The simple, inexpensive Oral Rehydration Solution (ORS) gained acceptance, and was later hailed as one of the most important medical advances of the 20th century.

From 1975 to 1979, Mahalanabis worked in cholera control for the World Health Organization (WHO) in Afghanistan, Egypt and Yemen. During the 1980s, he worked as a WHO consultant on research on the management of bacterial diseases. In 1983, Mahalanabis was made a member of the WHO's Diarrhoeal Diseases Control Programme. He remained in that role for over five years. He was also associated with Kolkata's National Institute of Cholera and Enteric Diseases (NICED) and the Institute of Child Health.

== Early life and education ==
Dilip Mahalanabis was born on November 12, 1934, in Kishoreganj district of Bengal Province of British India. He graduated from the Calcutta Medical College as a paediatrician in 1958 after working there as an intern. The establishment of the NHS in UK provided him an opportunity to pursue medicine in the UK, he obtained degrees from London and Edinburgh.

== Career ==
While he was in the UK he became the first Indian to be selected as the registrar for the Queen Elizabeth Hospital for Children. In the 1960s he joined the Johns Hopkins University International Centre for Medical Research and Training (JH-CMRT) in Kolkata, where he began his research into oral rehydration therapy.

=== Bangladeshi Refugee Camps and pioneering of Oral Rehydration Therapy ===
The outbreak of the Bangladesh Liberation War led to a massive refugee crisis, with most of the refugees ending up in India. Cholera quickly became a major cause of death among the starving and exhausted refugees, with a case fatality rate (CFR) of 30%. To help the government and non-governmental organisations deal with this situation, JH-CMRT sent its professional and paramedical personnel to the refugee camps. Dr. Mahalanabis and his team worked along the border of India and East Pakistan, with their treatment center being located in Bongaon. The 16 beds available to them in two cottages which served as cholera wards were completely insufficient to serve the 350,000 refugees living in the vicinity of the town, cholera wards quickly ran out of space with even floors being completely occupied by sick patients, this necessitated the setting up of a large separate tent with 100 cots. They also suffered from a shortage of intravenous fluids and had no way of obtaining them in the required quantities and trained personnel to administer them. Based on research available at the time, Mahalanabis and his team were confident that oral rehydration alone would be enough to prevent fatal dehydration in the early stages, with intravenous fluid being required only for severe cases after the onset of hypovolemic shock and severe acidosis.

He used an oral rehydration solution (ORS) using locally available ingredients and with minimum number of ingredients consisting of 22g glucose, 3.5g sodium chloride, 2.5g sodium hydrogencarbonate per litre of water. The glucose was prepared by JH-CMRT and the ingredients were weighed and packed in sealed and labeled polyethylene bags. This powdered mixture was added to drums containing potable water and given to patients in cups. Due to local sourcing of all the materials, the cost was just 11 paise (1.5 cents) per litre of the solution. The family members of the patients were instructed to provide the patients with the ORS due to the simplicity of the therapy. Potassium was also orally administered for children, and coconut water was provided whenever possible due to its high potassium content along with a small dose of tetracycline for both adults and children. During a 8-week period in which he and his team administered this therapy to 3700 patients, only 135 cases were fatal translating to a CFR of 3.6% which was a massive decrease from 30% fatality observed earlier, in the separate tent the CFR was even lower at 1%, however the conditions were so poor that half the patients died before any oral rehydration therapy could be even administered.

During this time Dr. Dhiman Barua who was the head of the bacterial diseases unit of the WHO visited the camp managed by Mahalanabis, and began boldly promoting the treatment in the WHO and UNICEF. Despite this Mahalanabis's treatment was met with skepticism from the scientific community with many journals refusing to publish his original paper, it would take 7 more years for oral rehydration therapy to be accepted as a good treatment for dehydration from diarrhea and other diseases. He never patented his ORS formula.

=== Later career ===
He worked in the cholera control unit of the WHO from 1975 to 1979, serving in Afghanistan, Egypt, and Yemen. He worked as a consultant on bacterial diseases for the WHO during the 1980s.

In the mid-1980s and early 1990s, he was a medical officer in the Diarrheal Disease Control Programme of the WHO.

In 1990 he was appointed as a clinical research officer at the International Centre for Diarrhoeal Disease Research (ICDDR,B), Bangladesh. Later going on to become the Director of Clinical Research there. In 2004, he and Dr. Nathaniel Pierce were working on an improved version of the ORS which would be more effective at preventing dehydration from all forms diarrhoea and confer addition benefits like reduced stool output.

== Awards and honours ==
In 1994, Mahalanabis was elected a foreign member of the Royal Swedish Academy of Sciences. In 2002 Dr. Mahalanabis, Dr. Nathaniel Pierce, Dr. David Nalin and Dr. Norbert Hirschhorn, were awarded the first Pollin Prize in Pediatric Research for their contributions to the discovery and implementation of oral rehydration therapy. In 2006 Dr. Mahalanabis, Dr. Richard A. Cash and Dr. David Nalin were awarded the Prince Mahidol Award, also for their role in the development and application of oral rehydration therapy. In 2023, he was posthumously awarded the Padma Vibhushan.

== Personal life and death ==
Mahalanabis was married to Jayanti Mahalanabis. He died at a private hospital in West Bengal, Kolkata on 16 October 2022, at the age of 87. He was suffering from lung infection and other old age related ailments.
