= John Snow, Inc =

American public health research and consulting firm

John Snow, Inc.
- Company type: Privately held
- Key people: Joel Lamstein (Founder) , Margaret Crotty (CEO) & (president)
- Website: www.jsi.com

John Snow, Inc. (JSI) is a global consulting organization dedicated to improving people’s lives around the world through greater health, education, and socioeconomic equity for individuals and communities, and to providing an environment where people of passion can pursue this cause. JSI was founded in 1978 by Joel Lamstein and Norbert Hirschhorn. In 2022, Margaret Crotty was appointed CEO and president, succeeding the founder, Lamstein. The firm is based in Boston.

== Activities ==
On January 8, 2010, as Secretary of State Hillary Clinton spoke on the 15th anniversary of the 1994 Cairo International Conference on Population and Development (ICPD), JSI president Joel Lamstein appeared as a guest blogger in the Huffington Post. The article, "Re-Discovering U.S. Leadership: An Unlikely Contender" highlights issues facing women around the world—in particular refugees and those displaced—as Secretary Clinton reaffirmed the U.S. government's support for universal access to reproductive health. Lamstein wrote, "Secretary of State Hillary Clinton will emphasize the U.S.'s commitment to advancing reproductive health worldwide. There will be strong words and very good intentions. However, what is needed is strong action and the political will to do what it takes to save lives and strengthen communities around the world."

JSI was the managing partner on the Supply Chain Management System (SCMS) project, funded by the US government's PEPFAR program. PRI's news radio show The World featured a story on the 8000-mile journey that antiretroviral (ARV) medication takes from the factory to the consumer. Titled "Delivering AIDS Drugs: The Long Journey" and reported by David Baron, the medication is followed from its point of manufacture in India to the remote village of Grabo in Côte d'Ivoire, where a woman named Grace is anxiously awaiting its arrival. SCMS helps get essential, life-saving medication to people in developing countries who live with AIDS.

JSI conducted a study of infections in Massachusetts hospitals, "Hospital Staffing and Health Care-Associated Infections: A Systematic Review of the Literature" in the October 2008 issue of Clinical Infectious Diseases (2008; 47:937-44). The article is part of the evidence review conducted by the JSI team for the Massachusetts Department of Public Health's Healthcare-Associated Infection project. The efforts are focused on eliminating preventable infections through the application of clinical 'best practices' and other incentives across Massachusetts hospitals.

JSI staff co-authored an article in the Journal of Public Health Management & Practice on the use of computer modeling in emergency preparedness.

In Connecticut, as the state recognized the need to adopt modern information technology in medical records management, it turned to JSI to assist with developing a statewide plan to phase in a standardized electronic system for the state's doctors, hospitals, and other healthcare providers to use in creating, storing, and exchanging medical records. The plan was submitted to the Connecticut legislature for review by the state's lawmakers.

== Fellowships ==
Since 2001, JSI has funded the Mabelle Arole Fellowship, which it founded in collaboration with the American Medical Student Association in honor of Dr. Mabelle Arole. The fellowship is named in memory of her dedication to the Jamkhed, India community and her wisdom in working with its members to determine what must be done and how to improve child and maternal health status. This award is given annually to a recent college graduate to study community-based primary health care in Jamkhed.
