= David Nalin =

American physiologist (born 1941)

David R. Nalin
- Born: David R. Naliboff; April 22, 1941 (age 85); New York, New York
- Education: Albany Medical College
- Known for: Oral rehydration therapy
- Awards: the Pollin Prize for Pediatric Research; the Mahidol Medal
- Scientific career
- Workplaces: International Centre for Diarrhoeal Disease Research, Bangladesh

David R. Nalin (born April 22, 1941) is an American physiologist, and winner of the Pollin Prize for Pediatric Research and the Prince Mahidol Award. Nalin had the key insight that oral rehydration therapy (ORT) would work if the volume of solution patients drank matched the volume of their fluid losses, allowing drastic reduction or replacement of intravenous therapy for cholera. He led the trials that first demonstrated ORT works in cholera and, crucially, in other dehydrating diarrheal diseases. Nalin's discoveries have been estimated to have saved over 50 million lives worldwide.

== Discovery of Oral Rehydration Therapy ==
In the fall of 1968, at age 26 and after his first year of medical residency, Nalin was working in Dacca, Bangladesh at the Pakistan–SEATO Cholera Research Laboratory when a cholera epidemic broke out near Chittagong, along the Burmese border. Until ORT, effective rehydration for severe dehydration generally required intravenous fluids, often inaccessible for patients in low-resource settings.

Indian scientist Hemendra Nath Chatterjee reported that Avomine reduced vomiting during cholera, making oral rehydration possible, using a solution of 4 g sodium chloride and 25 g glucose per liter of water; however, he did not present intake–output balance data to prove absorption, also administered the solution rectally by enema without physiologic basis, and used it only in the mildest subset of patients, with the rest receiving intravenous therapy. Thus his publication provided no credible basis for modern ORT, which is successful without Avomine or the folk medicine (Coleus sp. extract) he used. Nalin’s work drew on the known coupling of sodium and glucose transport in the small intestine, which remains intact—and even enhanced—during cholera. ORT proved effective for rehydration and maintenance therapy in acute watery diarrheal diseases, including cholera patients in shock after initial correction with relatively small volumes of intravenous fluids.

Building on this physiological basis, Nalin realized ORT could replace IV treatment for most diarrhea, not just cholera. Together with colleague Richard A. Cash, and despite difficult field conditions, he conducted trials that demonstrated ORT’s effectiveness. UNICEF later wrote: “No other single medical breakthrough of the 20th century has had the potential to prevent so many deaths over such a short period of time and at so little cost.” The Lancet called ORT “potentially the most important medical advance of this century.”

== Honors and recognition ==
Among his distinctions, in November 2002 Nalin received the first Pollin Prize in Pediatric Research (with Norbert Hirschhorn, Dilip Mahalanabis, and Nathaniel Pierce). In January 2007 he received the Mahidol Medal from the King of Thailand for the discovery and implementation of ORT.

== Quotes about the Science and Scientist, David Nalin ==
“No other single medical breakthrough of the 20th century has had the potential to prevent so many deaths over such a short period of time and at so little cost.” – UNICEF 1987.

“Potentially the most important medical advance of this century.” – The Lancet.

“Which medicine has saved more lives than any other and can be made by anyone in their kitchen … ? The answer is: eight teaspoons of sugar, half a teaspoon of salt and one litre of water … the perfect medicine.” – Jeremy Laurance, The Independent.

== Science of ORT ==
Many members of the research team responsible for the discovery of ORT had not yet completed their medical residencies. At the time there was a military draft in the U.S. and many medical students joined the U.S. Public Health Service, including the National Institutes of Health and the CDC’s Epidemic Intelligence Service, where some were posted overseas for research and care.

Every letter which went through the Bangladesh post office from 1993–1994 was stamped with a printed rhyme. Translated into English, it read (gur is a molasses):

Mix with much care,
Good water, a liter,
A pinch of salt with a fistful of gur,
Remove the menace for good.

== Timeline ==
1941 – David Nalin born in New York City.
1957 – Graduated from the Bronx High School of Science.
1961 – Graduated from Cornell University.
1965 – Graduated from Albany Medical College.
1966 – Joined U.S. Public Health Service.
1967 – Arrived in Dhaka (then East Pakistan) to do cholera research at the Pakistan–SEATO Cholera Research Laboratory as a research associate at the NIH.
1967 – Discovered that oral therapy could rehydrate cholera patients; collaborated with Richard A. Cash to develop the trial protocol.
1973 – Established and served at the Johns Hopkins Center for Medical Research in Dhaka, Bangladesh.
1975 – World Health Organization and UNICEF agreed to promote a single orally administered ORS solution to prevent dehydration caused by diarrhea.
1979 – Took charge of a malaria research centre in Lahore, Pakistan; expelled in early 1982 following unfounded allegations.
1983–2002 – Director of Clinical Research International; later Director of Vaccine Scientific Affairs, Merck Vaccine Division.
2002 – Received the Pollin Prize in Pediatric Research.
2007 – Received the Mahidol Medal in Bangkok.

== Books and publications ==
- Oral maintenance therapy for cholera in adults. Nalin DR, Cash RA, Islam R, Molla M, Phillips RA. Lancet. 1968 Aug 17;2(7564):370–3.
- Oral or nasogastric maintenance therapy in pediatric cholera patients. Nalin DR, Cash RA. J Pediatr. 1971 Feb;78(2):355–8.
- Worldwide experience with the CR326F-derived inactivated hepatitis A virus vaccine in pediatric and adult populations: an overview. Nalin DR, Kuter BJ, Brown L, et al. J Hepatol. 1993;18 Suppl 2:S51–5.
- Mumps, measles, and rubella vaccination and encephalitis. Nalin DR. BMJ. 1989 Nov 11;299(6709):1219.
- Oral therapy for diarrheal diseases. Nalin DR. J Diarrhoeal Dis Res. 1987 Dec;5(4):283–92.
- Recognition and treatment of anthrax. Nalin DR. JAMA. 1999 Nov 3;282(17):1624–5.
