= James Francis Martin =

American physician-scientist

James F. Martin is an American physician-scientist recognized for his contributions to the fundamental understanding of signaling pathways and genetic determinants of organ development, disease, and regenerative biology.

== Education ==
Martin pursued his education at Fordham University in Bronx, NY, where he earned a B.S. degree in Chemistry. He attended the University of Texas Medical School for his medical training, where he obtained his M.D. and completed residency and fellowship in general surgery. Dedicated to advancing research, Martin then pursued a Ph.D. to study molecular muscle biology under the mentorship of Eric Olson at the University of Texas Health Science Center in Houston.

== Career ==
Martin was appointed as the faculty at Texas A&M University in 1996 and promoted to full professor in 2006. In 2011, he moved his research laboratory to Baylor College of Medicine, where he became the Vivian Smith professor and the vice chair of the Department of Molecular Physiology and Biophysics. He is also the director of the Center for Organ Repair and Renewal at Baylor College of Medicine and the Cardiomyocyte Renewal Lab at the Texas Heart Institute.

== Honors and recognitions ==
- 2016 Michael E. DeBakey, MD Excellence in Research Award
- 2021 Fellow, the National Academy of Inventors
- 2022 Member, the Association of American Physicians

== Research ==
Martin's research investigates the genetic regulation of organ development, regeneration and disease, with a keen focus on the heart, and combines genetic as well as acquired mammalian disease models with advanced genomics approaches. His previous work has focused on understanding the functions of BMP signaling, Wnt signaling, and the transcription factor Pitx2 in the regulation of heart, craniofacial, and limb development in mice. An important milestone in his research was the discovery of the critical role of Hippo signaling in controlling heart size during development. Notably, his recent study demonstrated that inhibiting Hippo signaling can reverse heart failure in adult heart injury models of mice and pigs by promoting heart regeneration. Furthermore, his research discovered a direct interaction between Yap, a downstream effector of the Hippo signaling, and the dystrophin-glycoprotein complex. His laboratory also studies genetic underpinnings of human congenital heart diseases and the roles of different non-muscle cells in contributing to heart disease, regeneration, and repair.

== Entrepreneurship ==
Martin is a co-founder of Yap Therapeutics, a startup with a mission to translate his research findings into therapies that promote regenerative repair in patients with heart failure
