= Hemendra =

Hemendra is a given name. Notable people with the given name include:

- Hemendra Singh Banera (1946–2021), Indian politician
- Hemendra Prasad Barooah (1926–2013), Indian entrepreneur
- Hemendra Mohan Bose (1864–1916), Indian entrepreneur
- Hemendra Nath Chatterjee (fl. 1950s), Indian scientist
- Hemendra Singh Panwar (born 1937), Indian conservationist
- Hemendra Singh Rao Pawar (1968–2023), titular Maharaja of Dhar State
- Hemendra Kumar Roy (1888–1963), Indian Bengali writer
- Hemendra Chandra Singh (1967–2014), Indian politician
