= Tahmeed Ahmed =

Bangladeshi public health clinician-scientist

Executive Director of International Centre for Diarrhoeal Disease Research, Bangladesh
- Incumbent
- Assumed office February 1, 2021
- Preceded by: John D. Clemens

Personal details
- Education: Mymensingh Medical College; University of Tsukuba

Tahmeed Ahmed is a Bangladeshi Scientist with a particular research focus on Gastroenterology, Public Health Nutrition, and Global Health. He is a physician by training with specialization in treating patients with cholera and diarrheal diseases as well as maternal and childhood malnutrition. He has been serving as the Executive Director of the International Centre for Diarrhoeal Disease Research, Bangladesh (ICDDRB) since February 1, 2021. He is the first Bangladeshi to serve in the role.

Dr. Ahmed is also working as a Professor of Public Health Nutrition in the James P. Grant School of Public Health at BRAC University. He is an Affiliate Professor in the Department of Global Health at University of Washington. He is also chair of the drafting committee of Bangladesh's nutrition policy.

== Life ==
Dr. Ahmed's father was an economist who died while he was a child. His mother encouraged him to pursue a career in medicine. He attended St. Gregory's High School and College and Notre Dame College, Dhaka. Later he completed his MBBS from the Mymensingh Medical College in 1983. He was a postgraduate trainee majoring in internal medicine at Mymensingh Medical College Hospital from 1983 to 1984. In 1996, he completed a PhD from the University of Tsukuba.

== Career ==
Dr. Ahmed joined the International Centre for Diarrhoeal Disease Research, Bangladesh (icddr,b) in 1985 as a medical officer. He has been promoted to the position of Scientist in 2003 and appointed as the Head of Nutrition Programme at International Centre for Diarrhoeal Disease Research, Bangladesh in 2005. Dr. Ahmed became Senior Director of Nutrition and Clinical Services Division at icddr,b on 2015. On February 1, 2021, he succeeded Professor John D. Clemens as the Executive Director of icddr,b.

His research works primarily focus on community-based and clinical studies to improve nutritional status of populations particularly children and women and to further optimize management of diarrheal diseases and associated conditions. He is also interested in upstream research using tools to study microbiota, proteome, and metabolome in improving the treatment of nutritional disorders.

Dr. Ahmed is an Editorial Board Member in the American Journal of Clinical Nutrition. He was recognized as Goalkeepers Champion by the Gates Foundation in 2024. In 2025, he was named among TIME magazine’s 100 most influential people in health, recognized for his contributions to maternal and child health, nutrition, and evidence-based health solutions in resource-limited settings.

He also serves on the International Advisory Board of The Lancet Primary Care.

== Notable works ==
1. Development of a ready-to-use supplementary food made from locally available food ingredients in Bangladesh
2. Development of Microbiota-directed Therapeutic Food (MDCF)

== Awards ==
1. 2025 - TIME100 Health 2025
2. 2024 - Gates Foundation Goalkeepers Award for Nutrition
3. 2024 - 48th Gopalan Memorial Oration Gold Medal
4. 2024 - Public Health Excellence Award by the Public Health Foundation of Bangladesh
5. 2018 - Islamic Development Bank Transformers’ Roadshow Award
6. 2007 - Development Market Place Award 2007 from the World Bank
7. 2003 - Dr Sultan Ahmed Choudhury Gold Medal Award from Bangladesh Academy of Sciences
