= Richard A. Cash =

American global health researcher (1941–2024)

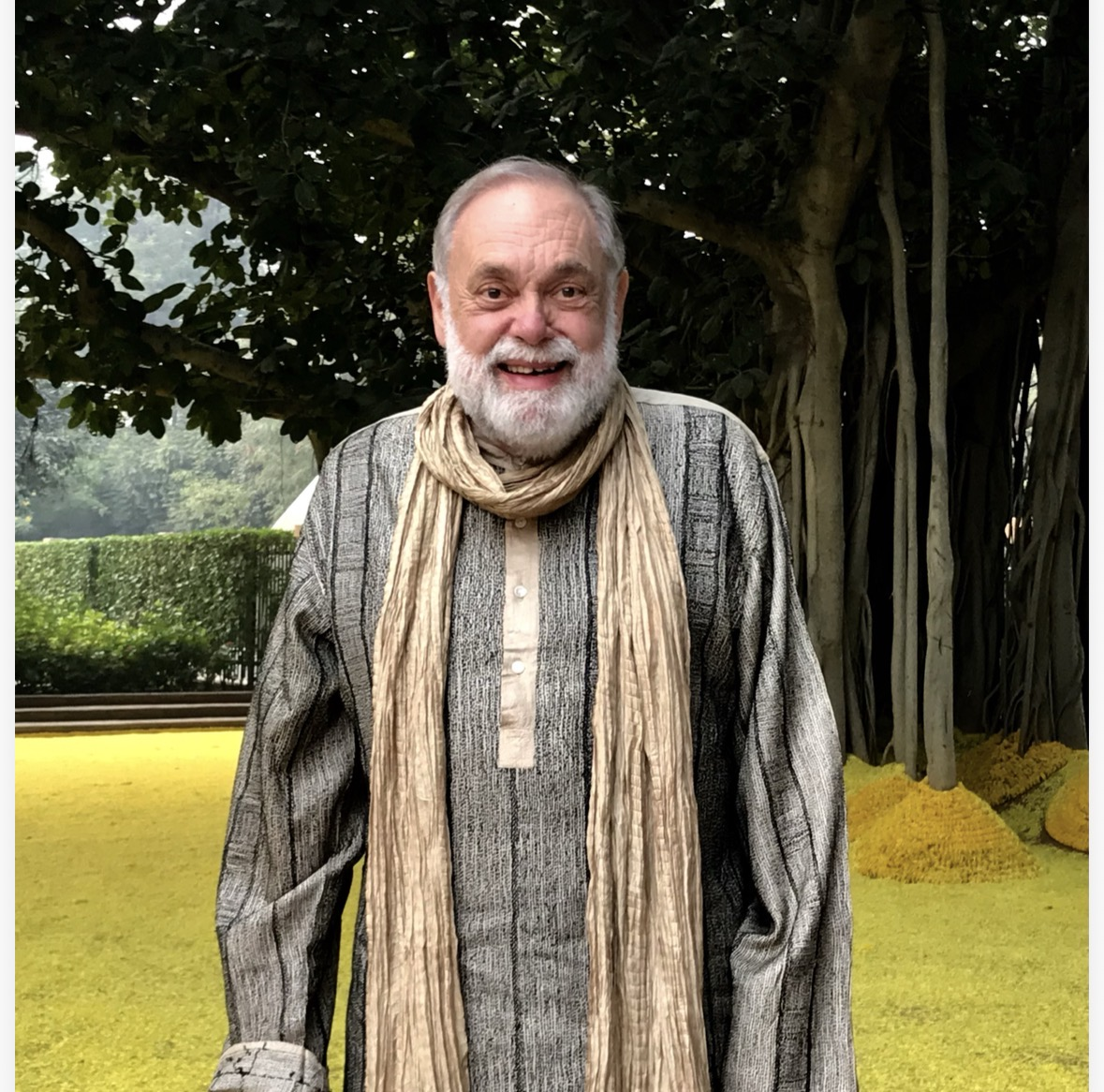
- Richard in Dehli circa 2018
- Born: June 9, 1941; Milwaukee, Wisconsin, U.S.
- Died: October 22, 2024 (aged 83); Cambridge, Massachusetts, U.S.
- Education: UW–Madison (BS); NYU School of Medicine (MD); Johns Hopkins University (MPH)
- Known for: Developing oral rehydration therapy
- Spouse: Stella Dupuis
- Awards: Prince Mahidol Award (2006)
- Scientific career
- Fields: Global health; population health
- Workplaces: Johns Hopkins Hospital; BRAC University; SEATO; ICDDR,B; AMCHSS,SCTIMST,Sree Chitra Tirunal Institute of Medical Sciences and Technology,India; Harvard School of Public Health; Harvard University

Richard Alan Cash (June 9, 1941 – October 22, 2024) was an American global health researcher, public health physician, and internist. He was a pioneer of oral rehydration therapy for lethal diseases such as cholera. This simple, practical therapy is estimated to have saved over 50 million lives.

== Medical career ==
Cash was an alumnus of the University of Wisconsin–Madison (B.S., 1963), New York University School of Medicine (M.D., 1966), and Johns Hopkins School of Hygiene and Public Health (MPH, 1973).

Cash began his international career over 40 years ago when he was assigned by NIAID of the NIH to the Pakistan-SEATO Cholera Research Laboratory (CRL) in Dhaka, East Pakistan (now the ICDDR,B in Dhaka, Bangladesh). While there, he and his colleagues developed and conducted the first clinical trials of oral rehydration therapy (ORT) in adult and pediatric cholera patients and patients with other infectious causes of diarrhea. This technology matches the volume of fluid losses from dehydration patients with the volume they consume so that the fluid replacement packets greatly reduce or completely replace IV therapy (particularly where it is not feasible or unavailable), which was then the only current treatment for cholera. Discoveries in ORT have been estimated to have saved over 50 million lives worldwide. World Health Organization (WHO) estimates are that at least 60 million children have been spared painful deaths because of ORT. They also conducted the first field trials of ORT, the first community-based trials of ORT, and the first use of amino acids (glycine) as an additional substrate. In the late 1970s, Cash worked with BRAC (presently the world's largest NGO in terms of programs and personnel) on their OTEP (Oral Therapy Extension Programme), which taught over 13 million mothers and caregivers how to prepare and use ORT in the home using the "pinch and scoop" method.

It is estimated by WHO researchers that, each year, around 500 million packs of the oral rehydration solution are used in more than 60 developing countries, saving over 60 million lives around the world. For demonstrating how inexpensive and simple-to-use oral rehydration therapy (ORT) could treat cholera and other diarrheal diseases, then by promoting in the developing world customized applications of oral rehydration therapy (ORT) developed by Cash and David R. Nalin (at Merck in Vaccine Development from 1983 to 2002), Cash, David Nalin, and Dilip Mahalanabis became joint recipients of the 2006 Prince Mahidol Award in public health for "exemplary contributions in the field of public health" and for their contributions "to the application of the oral rehydration solution in the treatment of severe diarrhea worldwide, including Thailand.

On November 8, 2011, Cash was presented with the 2011 James F. and Sarah T. Fries Foundation Prize for Improving Health at the Centers for Disease Control and Prevention for his leadership in the development and dissemination of Oral Rehydration Therapy as a practical treatment for cholera and other diarrheal diseases that has saved the lives of at least 60 million children worldwide.

He was a Senior Lecturer in International Health at the Harvard T.H. Chan School of Public Health in Boston.

== Contributions to ethics ==
Cash lectured internationally and authored or co-authored a number of published papers on research ethics. He also taught a Harvard course and had long directed (until 2009) a summer intensive workshop on those issues. He won continued NIH funding for a series of courses on research ethics in medical and health research done in resource-poor nations that touch on over a dozen issues listed on the public course's website. The use of case method teaching has been a critical element of all his courses. Many of the currently-used ethics case studies, the course outlines, many readings, and other course materials are available on that site. After the breakup of the Soviet Union, Cash served (beginning in 2003) with the Russian Academy of Sciences project on development of bioethics capacity in the Commonwealth of Independent States.

== Contributions to public health ==
Cash explored contrasts within and between nations in health research ethics as a PI (Principal Investigator) of a training grant from the National Institutes of Health on "Ethical Issues in International Health Research" at HSPH. For eleven years, as Director of the Program on Ethical Issues in International Health Research and in line with his deep commitment to capacity building in growing nations, he has conducted training workshops based on this research in at HSPH, and in 18 nations in South America, Africa, India, and the Middle East, covering issues of informed consent, confidentiality, conflict of interest, investigator responsibilities to study populations, research in resource poor environments, and the development of ethical review committees. He has also overseen the training of 20 Fellows from Asia, and he has conducted over 30 workshops on research ethics in 12 nations.He also held faculty positions and was involved in multiple researches at the Achutha Menon Centre for Health Science Studies (AMCHSS), Sree Chitra Tirunal Institute for Medical Sciences and Technology, Trivandrum, Kerala, India, where he taught in the Master of Public Health (MPH) program,which is the first MPH program in India.

== Later public appearances ==
Richard Cash had been interviewed intermittently (often in remote meetings) to comment on the legacy of work he had done in the Middle East, India, and Himalayas.

== Death ==
Cash died in Cambridge, Massachusetts on October 22, 2024, from brain cancer at the age of 83.

== Accolades ==
- 1994 − Special Citation − 25th Anniversary of the development of Oral Rehydration Therapy (ORT) ICDDRB/Government of Bangladesh
- 2006 − 2006 Prince Mahidol Award, received in January 2007 in Bangkok
- 2007 − Solomon A. Berson Medical Alumni Achievement Award, New York University School of Medicine
- 2008 − Distinguished Alumni Award, New York University
- 2011 − 2011 Fries Prize for Improving Health
- 2018 − '50 Years of ORT: Cashing in on the Poor Man's Gatorade' − Symposium celebrating the development of ORT and the contributions of Richard Cash and David Nalin, November 19, 2018, sponsored by the Department of Global Health and Population, Harvard Global Health Institute, and Harvard T.H. Chan School of Public Health, Boston, MA.
- 2025 − The Richard Cash Memorial Fund was announced on March 7, 2025, by the Department of Global Health and Population, his academic department at the Harvard T.H. Chan School of Public Health.
- Richard A. Cash – Prof K. Mohandas Award for Best Outgoing MPH Student is being awarded at Achutha Menon Centre for Health Science Studies (AMCHSS), Sree Chitra Tirunal Institute for Medical Sciences and Technology(SCTIMST),Kerala, India for more than a decade.

== Books and publications ==
Cash published over 120 peer-reviewed academic papers, spanning his work over 50 years. Some highlights include:

- Oral maintenance therapy for cholera in adults. Nalin DR, Cash RA, Islam R, Molla M, Phillips RA. Lancet. 1968 Aug 17;2(7564):370-3.

This paper in The Lancet is the original report of Dr. Nalin and colleagues’ work with ORT.

- Oral or nasogastric maintenance therapy in pediatric cholera patients. Nalin DR, Cash RA. J Pediatr. 1971 Feb;78(2):355-8.

This paper describes the use of ORT in pediatric patients.

- Cash, R., Wikler, D., Saxena, A., Capron, A. Casebook on Ethical Issues in International Health Research, Geneva: World Health Organization, 2009, 2010.

Translated into three other languages, including Arabic, Russian, and Spanish. ISBN 978-924154772-7; (NLM classification: W 20.5).
