= Pollin Prize for Pediatric Research =

Annual award given to physicians from 2002 to 2010

The Pollin Prize for Pediatric Research was an annual award given to physicians who contributed important advances to the field of pediatrics, and was the only existing international pediatric award. The prize was created in 2002 by Irene and Abe Pollin, and funded by the Linda and Kenneth Pollin Foundation. It was administered by the NewYork-Presbyterian Hospital, and as of 2003, Dr. Rudolph Leibel was chairman of the selection panel.

The prize is no longer awarded.

== Recipients ==
- 2010 – Roscoe O. Brady and Charles R. Scriver
- 2009 – Basil S. Hetzel
- 2008 – John Allen Clements
- 2007 – Samuel L. Katz
- 2006 – No award
- 2005 – Eric N. Olson, Abraham Rudolph
- 2004 – Alfred Sommer
- 2003 – Emil Frei, Emil J. Freireich, Donald Pinkel, and James F. Holland
- 2002 – Dilip Mahalanabis, Norbert Hirschhorn, David Nalin, and Nathaniel F. Pierce

== See also ==
- List of medicine awards
