= Wiwat Rojanapithayakorn =

Thai public health official

Wiwat Rojanapithayakorn (Thai: วิวัฒน์ โรจนพิทยากร) (born, 25 October 1950) is a Thai public health official known for developing the 100% condom program in Thailand in 1989. He first pioneered the program as the director of Thailand's Office of Communicable Disease Control in Ratchaburi, and while he was the director of the country's Center for the Prevention and Control of AIDS. He, together with Mechai Viravaidya, won the Prince Mahidol Award in 2009 for this work. He later served as the leader of the Joint United Nations Programme on HIV/AIDS team in Beijing, China.
