= Scandinavian Journal of Work, Environment & Health =

- Discipline: Occupational medicine
- Language: English
- Edited by: Alex Burdorf, Reiner Rugulies

Publication details
- History: 1975-present
- Publisher: Nordic Association of Occupational Safety and Health
- Frequency: Bimonthly
- Open access: Yes
- License: CC-BY 4.0
- Impact factor: 5.024 (2020)

Standard abbreviations
- ISO 4: Scand. J. Work Environ. Health

Indexing
- CODEN: SWEHDO
- ISSN: 0355-3140 (print); 1795-990X (web)
- LCCN: 76646984
- OCLC no.: 756482211

Links
- Journal homepage; Online access; Online archive

The Scandinavian Journal of Work, Environment & Health is a bimonthly peer-reviewed open-access medical journal. It covers research on occupational and environmental health and safety. It is published by the Nordic Association of Occupational Safety and Health. Occasionally the journal publishes supplementary issues. It was established in 1975 and the editors-in-chief are Alex Burdorf (Erasmus University) and Reiner Rugulies (National Research Centre for the Working Environment).

== Abstracting and indexing ==
The journal is abstracted and indexed in Index medicus/MEDLINE/PubMed, Science Citation Index, Biological Abstracts, Social Sciences Citation Index, Current Contents/Social & Behavioral Sciences, Current Contents/Clinical Medicine, BIOSIS Previews, Excerpta Medica, EBSCO databases, Cambridge Scientific Abstracts, and PsycINFO. According to the Journal Citation Reports, the journal has a 2020 impact factor of 5.024.

== See also ==
- Occupational disease
- Occupational health psychology
- Occupational safety and health
- Organizational psychology
