= Norbert Hirschhorn =

Austrian-American public health physician

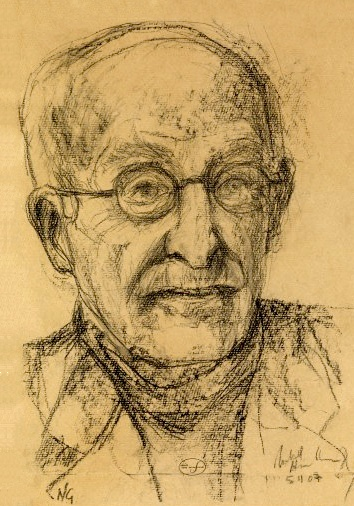
- A drawing of Hirschhorn in 2007
- Born: 1938 (age 87–88); Vienna, Austria
- Education: Columbia University (AB); Columbia University College of Physicians and Surgeons (MD); Vermont College of Fine Arts (MFA)
- Occupations: Physician (retired), poet
- Website: bertzpoet.com

Norbert Hirschhorn (born 1938) is an Austrian-born American public health physician. He was one of the inventors and developers of the life-saving method called oral rehydration therapy for adults and children suffering fluid loss from cholera and other infectious diarrheal illnesses. It is estimated that his work has saved around 50 million people suffering from dehydration.

In the past decade, he has conducted research on tobacco control, particularly examining once-secret, now publicly available tobacco industry documents. In retirement he devotes himself to writing and publishing poetry and literary book reviews.

== Life and education ==
Hirschhorn was born in Vienna, Austria, in 1938. He escaped the Nazi regime with his parents to London, where they spent the war until immigrating to the United States. He has three children from his first marriage: Elisabeth Hirschhorn Donahue, John Hirschhorn and Robert Hirschhorn. Hirschhorn grew up in New York, attending the Bronx High School of Science. He graduated from Columbia College, Columbia University in the City of New York in 1958 with a Bachelor of Arts, and later received his medical degree at Columbia University College of Physicians and Surgeons in 1962. He specialized in internal medicine with internship and residencies at Boston City Hospital, Harvard II and IV medical services (1962–64, 1967–8), and gained certification in 1970 from the American Board of Internal Medicine.

Hirschhorn joined the US Public Health Service in 1964, and was assigned to the Pakistan-Seato Cholera Research Laboratory, Dacca, East Pakistan (now the International Center for Diarrheal Disease Control, Bangladesh), where he conducted research on cholera and other diarrheal diseases and demonstrated the proof of concept of oral rehydration therapy.

== Career ==
After a post-doctoral fellowship from the National Institute of Arthritis and Metabolic Disease in electrophysiology at Harvard-affiliated Beth Israel Hospital in Boston (1968–1970), he was appointed Assistant Professor of Clinical Medicine, Johns Hopkins University School of Medicine at Baltimore City Hospital, and Lecturer, Department of International Health, Johns Hopkins University School of Hygiene and Public Health (1970–1973). In that time, he introduced oral rehydration therapy on the White River Apache Indian Reservation with a grant from the National Institute of Allergy and Infectious Diseases. It was demonstrated that children would voluntarily drink as much of the solution as needed to restore hydration; and that rehydration and early re-feeding would protect their nutrition. Wide application of the therapy in both clinical and non-clinical settings resulted. From that work, Hirschhorn established the clinical physiology of rehydration in children.

In 1978, Joel Lamstein and Hirschhorn founded John Snow, Incorporated (JSI), named after the father of epidemiology, John Snow, and initially launched as a small for-profit business focused on health care in the United States. In 1980, the organization began working internationally, with Hirschhorn serving as Vice-President of the International Division. From 1983 to 1991, JSI implemented the USAID-Ministry of Health sponsored National Control of Diarrheal Diseases Project in Egypt. Country-wide implementation of oral rehydration therapy and other control measures dramatically reduced child mortality. From 1990 to 1993, with a United Nations Food and Agriculture Organization team, Hirschhorn conducted research on pesticide poisoning in Indonesian farmers.

From 1993 to 1995, Hirschhorn was Visiting Professor of Public Health at the University of Minnesota. He then left JSI to join the Minnesota Department of Health, directing the Division of Family Health (1995–1998). Between 1998 and 2005, he served as a lecturer at the Yale University School of Medicine, Department of Epidemiology and Public Health; Visiting Senior Lecturer and Consultant, Faculty of Health Sciences, American University of Beirut, Lebanon; Visiting Lecturer, Princeton University, Woodrow Wilson School of Public and International Affairs; and Visiting Researcher at the National Public Health Institute in Finland. In those intervening years, he also served as a consultant to the World Health Organization Tobacco-Free Initiative, conducting research on tobacco industry documents. Several seminal papers were produced.

Since his retirement, Hirschhorn has published several essays on the life and illnesses of famous personalities of the 19th century, including Abraham Lincoln. He writes book reviews, and has published seven collections of poetry. He lives in Minneapolis, Minnesota.

== Achievements ==
For his work in oral rehydration therapy, Hirschhorn was recognized by President William J. Clinton at a White House ceremony in 1993 as an "American Health Hero"; received the Charles A. Dana Foundation Award for Pioneering Achievement in Health in 1990; and the Pollin Prize for Pediatric Research in 2002.

== Memberships and professional affiliations ==
Professional Societies: American Public Health Association; National Council for International Health (Chair of 16th Annual Conference, 1989); American Association for the Advancement of Science; Academy of Breastfeeding Medicine; Society for Research on Nicotine and Tobacco; Emily Dickinson International Society; British Haiku Society; Society of Medical Writers, UK; Poetry Society, UK.

Board Member of: Child Health Foundation, President; 1994–1996; National Council for International Health (1990–1996), Minnesota International Health Volunteers (1994–1997), Immunization Action Coalition (Minnesota), Minnesota Council for Preventive Medicine (1993–2000).

== Bibliography ==
- Hirschhorn, N; Cash, RA; Woodward, WE; Spivey, GH (1972). "Oral fluid therapy of Apache children with acute infectious diarrhoea". Lancet. 2 (7766): 15–8. doi:10.1016/s0140-6736(72)91277-9. PMID 4113619.
- Hirschhorn, Norbert; McCarthy, Brian J.; Ranney, Bobbette; Hirschhorn, Mary Ann; Woodward, Susan T.; Lacapa, Ann; Cash, Richard A.; Woodward, William E.; Weil, William B. (1973). "Ad libitum oral glucose-electrolyte therapy for acute diarrhea in apache children". The Journal of Pediatrics. 83 (4): 562–71. doi:10.1016/s0022-3476(73)80215-x. PMID 4581015.
- Hirschhorn, N; Denny, KM (1975). "Oral glucose-electrolyte therapy for diarrhea: A means to maintain or improve nutrition?". The American Journal of Clinical Nutrition. 28 (2): 189–92. doi:10.1093/ajcn/28.2.189. PMID 1054211.
- Hirschhorn, N (1980). "The treatment of acute diarrhea in children. An historical and physiological perspective". The American Journal of Clinical Nutrition. 33 (3): 637–63. doi:10.1093/ajcn/33.3.637. PMID 6766662.
- Hirschhorn, N (2000). "Shameful science: Four decades of the German tobacco industry's hidden research on smoking and health". Tobacco Control. 9 (2): 242–8. doi:10.1136/tc.9.2.242. PMC 1748350. PMID 10841866.
- Hirschhorn, N.; Bialous, SA (2001). "Second-hand smoke and risk assessment: What was in it for the tobacco industry?". Tobacco Control. 10 (4): 375–82. doi:10.1136/tc.10.4.375. PMC 1747615. PMID 11740031.
- Hirschhorn, N (2004). "Corporate social responsibility and the tobacco industry: Hope or hype?". Tobacco Control. 13 (4): 447–53. doi:10.1136/tc.2003.006676. PMC 1747956. PMID 15564636.
- Hirschhorn, N; Bialous, SA; Shatenstein, S (2006). "The Philip Morris External Research Program: Results from the first round of projects". Tobacco Control. 15 (3): 267–9. doi:10.1136/tc.2005.012799. PMC 2564674. PMID 16728760.
- Kishi, M; Hirschhorn, N; Djajadisastra, M; Satterlee, LN; Strowman, S; Dilts, R (1995). "Relationship of pesticide spraying to signs and symptoms in Indonesian farmers". Scandinavian Journal of Work, Environment & Health. 21 (2): 124–33. doi:10.5271/sjweh.19. PMID 7618058.
- Miller, Peter; Hirschhorn, Norbert (1995). "The effect of a national control of diarrheal diseases program on mortality: The case of Egypt". Social Science & Medicine. 40 (10): S1–S30. doi:10.1016/0277-9536(95)00001-n. PMID 7638641.
