= Stanley Schultz =

American physician

- Born: October 26, 1931
- Died: October 23, 2014 (aged 82)
- Education: New York University School of Medicine (M.D.)
- Known for: Oral rehydration therapy research
- Scientific career
- Fields: Medicine, physiology
- Workplaces: University of Texas Health Science Center at Houston McGovern Medical School

Stanley G. Schultz (October 26, 1931 – October 23, 2014) was an American physician and scientist whose work led to the development of oral rehydration therapy. He held the Fondren Family Chair in Cellular Signaling and the H. Wayne Hightower Distinguished Professorship in the Medical Sciences at the University of Texas Health Science Center at Houston (UTHealth) before becoming the center's medical school dean.

== Biography ==
After growing up in New York City, Schultz completed his undergraduate studies at Columbia University and attended New York University School of Medicine. After postgraduate work at Harvard Medical School and military service at the School of Aerospace Medicine at Brooks Air Force Base, Schultz took faculty positions at Harvard Medical School and the University of Pittsburgh School of Medicine.

He joined the physiology faculty at the University of Texas Health Science Center at Houston in 1979, and he held the school's Fondren Family Chair in Cellular Signaling and the H. Wayne Hightower Distinguished Professorship in the Medical Sciences. He was named interim dean of the UT Houston Medical School in 2003, then served as dean in 2004 and 2005 before retiring for health reasons.

Schultz's scientific work studied ion transport in the small intestine, and some of his research findings led to the development of oral rehydration therapy. He was the 1992-93 president of the American Physiological Society. He received Thailand's Prince Mahidol Award in 2007. He was elected to membership in the Association of American Physicians and the European Academy of Sciences.

Schultz died of cancer in 2014 in Mountain View, California. He had moved to the area to be closer to his children and grandchildren.
