= Hemendra Nath Chatterjee =

Indian scientist who invented oral rehydration therapy

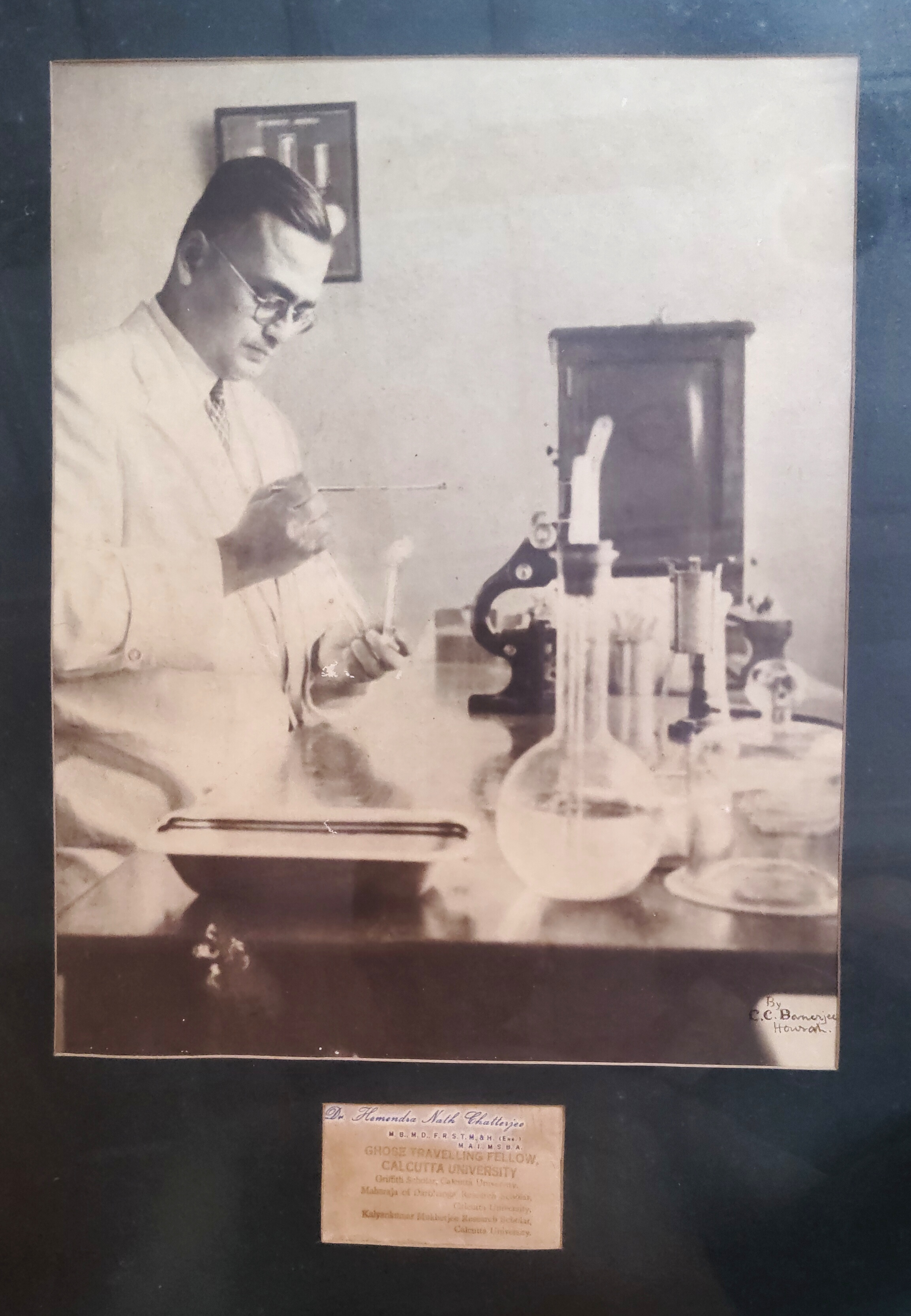
Dr. Hemendra Nath Chatterjee (c. 1950s), Indian physician and pioneer of early oral rehydration therapy (ORT) research.

Hemendra Nath Chatterjee was an Indian scientist from West Bengal known for the earliest publication of a formula for Orally Rehydrated Saline (ORS) for diarrhea management in 1952. Although his results were published in The Lancet, they didn't receive much recognition from Western scientists until later. Some argue this was for cultural reasons as his treatment protocol included traditional medicine, and also because the scientific underpinnings of ORS weren't well understood.

In his 1953 study, Chatterjee gave a dilute salt and glucose solutions both rectally and orally to a small percentage of pre-selected mildly ill cholera patients. He did not measure intake and output and presented no balance dated confirming absorption. In that paper he states that Avomine can stop vomiting during cholera and then oral rehydration is possible. Patients also received a leaf decoction of Coleus aromaticus, a folk anti-diarrheal, which is now known to make diarrhea worse. The formulation of the fluid replacement solution was hypotonic sodium chloride, 25 g of glucose and 1000 ml of water.
