= Institute of Child Health, Kolkata =

Institute of Child Health

- Location within Kolkata Location within India

Geography
- Location: West Bengal, India
- Coordinates: 22.5388171°N 88.3716124°E

Organisation
- Type: Specialist
- Affiliated university: West Bengal University of Health Sciences

Services
- Speciality: Pediatrics, teaching

History
- Opened: 1953; 73 years ago

Links
- Website: www.ichcalcutta.org
- Lists: Hospitals in India

Institute of Child Health is a hospital in Kolkata, India offering post-graduate training in pediatrics under West Bengal University of Health Sciences. It has a distinction of being the first pediatric institute of India.

== History ==
The Institute of Child Health was set up by Dr. K. C. Chaudhuri, the doyen of Indian pediatrics, in Kolkata in 1953. Jawaharlal Nehru, the then Prime Minister of India, inaugurated the institute on 16 January 1956. It is the first pediatric institute of India.
