= Eric N. Olson =

American molecular biologist

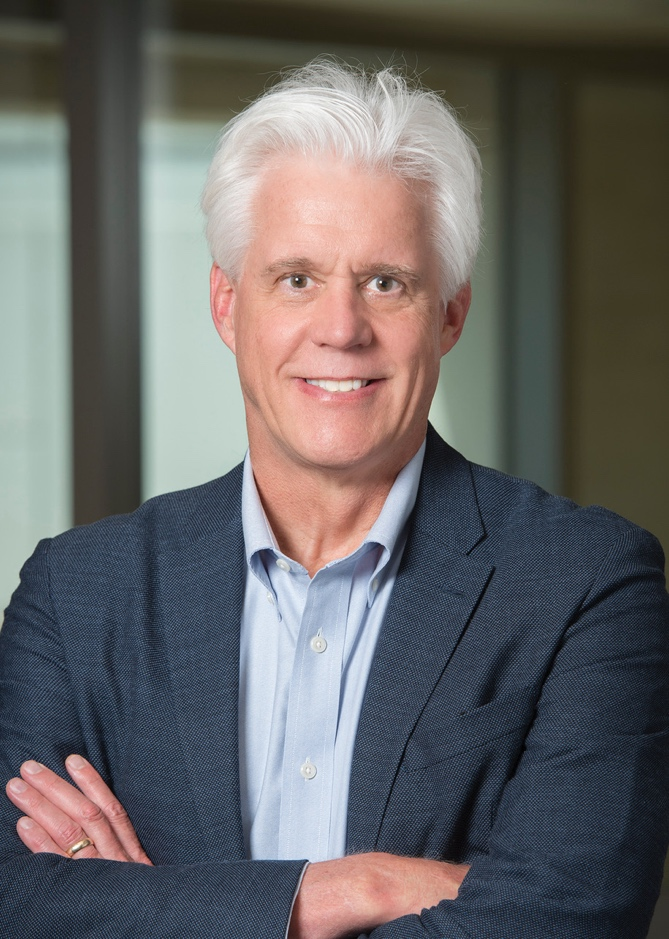
- Born: September 27, 1955 (age 71); Rochester, New York

Eric Newell Olson (born September 27, 1955 in Rochester, New York) is an American molecular biologist. He is professor and chair of the Department of Molecular Biology at the University of Texas Southwestern Medical Center in Dallas, where he also holds the Robert A. Welch Distinguished Chair in Science, the Annie and Willie Nelson Professorship in Stem Cell Research, and the Pogue Distinguished Chair in Research on Cardiac Birth Defects.

== Biography ==
Olson grew up in North Carolina and attended Wake Forest University, receiving a B.A. in Chemistry and Biology, and a Ph.D. in Biochemistry. After postdoctoral training at Washington University School of Medicine, he began his scientific career at MD Anderson Cancer Center in Houston. In 1995, he founded the Department of Molecular Biology at UT Southwestern.

Olson and his trainees discovered many of the key genes and mechanisms responsible for development of the heart and other muscles. His laboratory also unveiled the signaling pathways responsible for pathological cardiac growth and heart failure. Olson’s discoveries at the interface of developmental biology and medicine have illuminated the fundamental principles of organ formation and have provided new concepts in the quest for cardiovascular therapeutics. His most recent work has provided a new strategy for correction of Duchenne muscular dystrophy using CRISPR gene editing.

Olson is a member of the U.S. National Academy of Sciences, the National Academy of Medicine, and the American Academy of Arts and Sciences. His work has been recognized by numerous awards, including the Basic Research Prize and Research Achievement Award from the American Heart Association, the Pasarow Medical Research Award, the Passano Award, the March of Dimes Prize in Developmental Biology and the Louisa Gross Horwitz Prize 2025. In 2009, the French Academy of Science awarded Dr. Olson the Lefoulon-Delalande Grand Prize for Science. His work has been cited over 200,000 times in the scientific literature.

Olson was awarded the Eugene Braunwald Mentorship Award from the American Heart Association.

Olson serves on the advisory boards of numerous organizations including the Howard Hughes Medical Institute and has founded multiple biotechnology companies to translate the discoveries from his laboratory to the clinic. In his spare time, he plays guitar and harmonica with The Transactivators, a rock band inspired by the Texas musician, Willie Nelson, who created the professorship that supports Olson's research.

== Awards and honors ==
- 1998 Fellow, American Academy of Arts and Sciences
- 1998 Edgar Haber Cardiovascular Medicine Research Award, American Heart Association
- 1999 American Heart Association Basic Research Prize
- 1999 Gill Heart Institute Award for Outstanding Contributions to Cardiovascular Medicine
- 1999 Elected to U.S. National Academy of Sciences
- 2000 Pasarow Award in Cardiovascular Medicine
- 2000 NIH MERIT Award
- 2001 Elected to the Institute of Medicine of National Academy of Sciences
- 2003 Founding Distinguished Scientist Award, American Heart Association
- 2003 Louis and Artur Lucian Award for Research in Cardiovascular Diseases, McGill University
- 2005 Outstanding Investigator Award, International Society for Heart Research (ISHR)
- 2005 Pollin Prize for Pediatric Research, Columbia University
- 2008 American Heart Association Research Achievement Award
- 2009 LeFoulon Delalande Grand Prix Awarded by the Institut de France and French Academy of Science
- 2012 Passano Award, Passano Foundation
- 2013 March of Dimes Prize in Developmental Biology, March of Dimes
- 2016 Eugene Braunwald Academic Mentorship Award, American Heart Association
- 2019 Edwin Grant Conklin Medal.
- 2025 Louisa Gross Horwitz Prize (Columbia University).
