= Alfred Sommer =

American ophthalmologist and academic

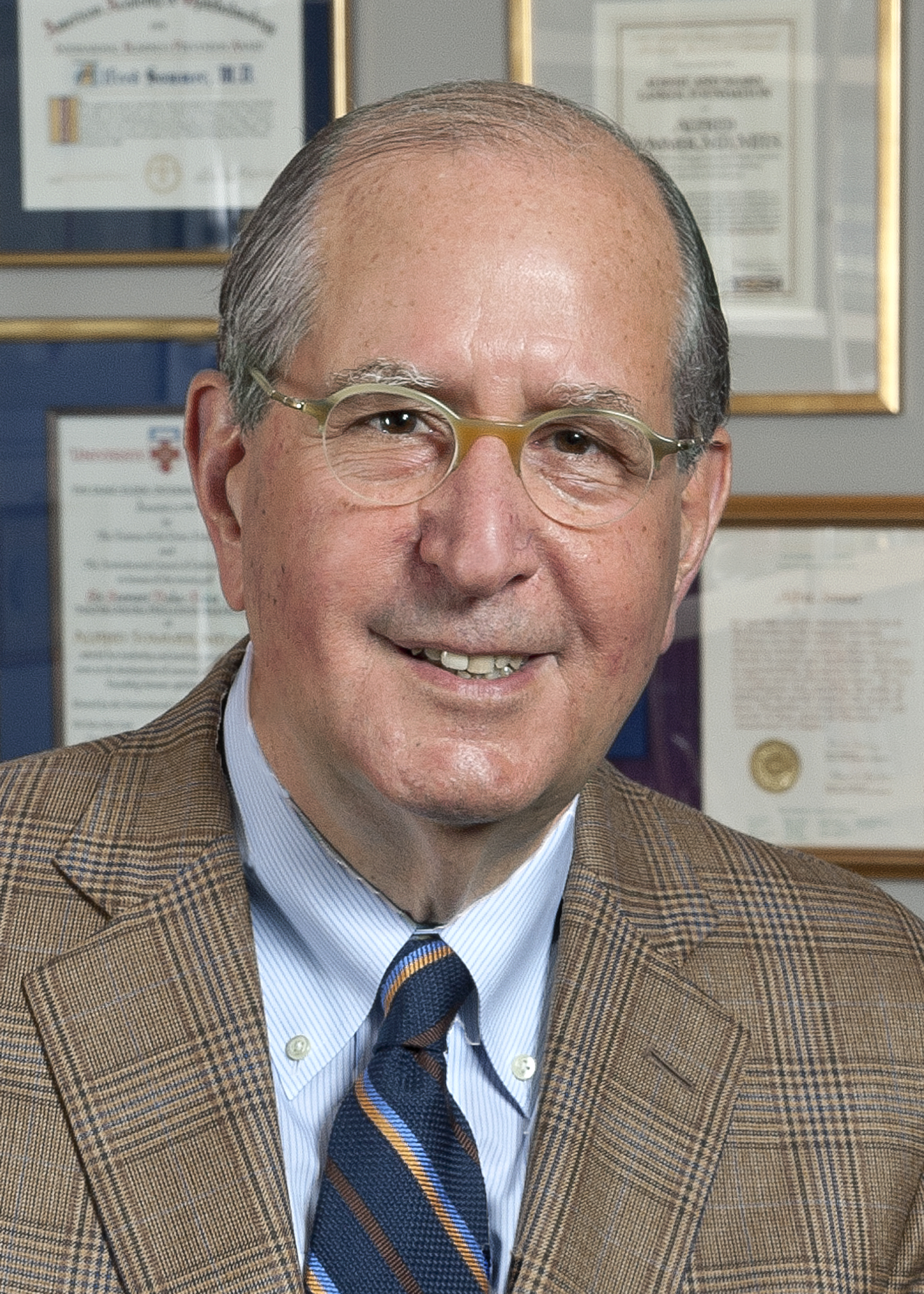
- Alfred Sommer
- Born: October 2, 1942 (age 83); New York City, New York, U.S.
- Education: Union College (B.S., 1963); Harvard Medical School (M.D., 1967); Johns Hopkins Bloomberg School of Public Health (M.H.S., 1973)
- Known for: Vitamin A deficiency Blindness prevention
- Awards: Centers for Disease Control and Prevention Fries Prize for Improving Health (2008); American Academy of Ophthalmology Laureate (2011); Helen Keller Prize for Vision Research (2005); National Academy of Sciences (2001); Lasker-DeBakey Clinical Medical Research Award (1997); National Academy of Medicine (1992)
- Scientific career
- Fields: Ophthalmology; Epidemiology; International Health

Alfred (Al) Sommer (born October 2, 1942) is an American ophthalmologist and epidemiologist at the Johns Hopkins Bloomberg School of Public Health. His research on vitamin A in the 1970s and 1980s revealed that dosing even mildly vitamin A deficient children with an inexpensive, large dose vitamin A capsule twice a year reduces child mortality by as much as 34 percent. The World Bank and the Copenhagen Consensus list vitamin A supplementation as one of the most cost-effective health interventions in the world.

== Biography ==
=== Early life and education ===
Sommer was born on October 2, 1942, in New York City. He attended Union College in Schenectady, New York and graduated summa cum laude in 1963. At Union College, Sommer received a Bachelor of Science in biology, with a minor in history. Sommer attended Harvard Medical School and obtained his MD in 1967. He served as a medical intern and resident at Harvard University's Beth Israel Deaconess Medical Center (formerly Beth Israel Hospital) from 1967 to 1969.

In 1969, Sommer joined the Public Health Service as an Epidemic Intelligence Service (EIS) officer at the Centers for Disease Control and Prevention, and moved overseas with his family to work in the Cholera Research Laboratory in Dhaka, Bangladesh (then known as East Pakistan), where he conducted the first formal epidemiologic investigation of a major disaster: the 1970 cyclone that washed away a quarter of a million people in a single night. He assisted Bangladeshis in their Liberation War and, in 2013, the Bangladesh government bestowed upon him the “Friends of Liberation War Honour” for his contributions during the revolution.

In 1972, Sommer returned to the United States and continued his education at the Johns Hopkins School of Hygiene and Public Health (which became known as the Johns Hopkins Bloomberg School of Public Health in 2000). Upon completing his Master of Health Sciences degree in epidemiology there, Sommer spent three years as a resident and fellow in ophthalmology at the Wilmer Eye Institute (associated with the Johns Hopkins School of Medicine) from 1973 to 1976.

=== Career ===
Following his training at the Wilmer Eye Institute, Sommer and his family moved to Indonesia, where he began his groundbreaking work on vitamin A deficiency. Following that, he moved to London as a visiting professor at the Institute of Ophthalmology. Then, in 1980, he returned to the Johns Hopkins Wilmer Eye Institute as the founding director of the Dana Center for Preventive Ophthalmology. He held this position until 1990 when he assumed the position of dean of the Johns Hopkins Bloomberg School of Public Health. While serving as the dean of the Bloomberg School, Sommer expanded both the faculty and student bodies and raised hundreds of millions of dollars to renovate and dramatically expand the School's physical plant and its research and educational programs. Sommer's efforts helped the school attain the #1 spot on the U.S. News & World Report Graduate Schools of Public Health ranking, a prestigious title it still holds to this day. Sommer served as dean of the Johns Hopkins Bloomberg School of Public Health until 2005, when he returned to work as a professor and researcher of both epidemiology and ophthalmology. Sommer is currently a Johns Hopkins University Distinguished Service Professor, inaugural Gilman Scholar, and Dean Emeritus of the Bloomberg School of Public Health.

In the mid-1980s, Sommer initiated and led the development of one of the first, and still rigorously updated, clinical guidelines of any medical specialty: the "Preferred Practice Patterns" of the American Academy of Ophthalmology.

== Research ==
=== Vitamin A-deficiency and child mortality research ===
Sommer initiated his research on the causes and effects of vitamin A deficiency while still a resident at the Wilmer Institute. After completing his residency, Sommer moved his family to Indonesia for three years to continue this work in depth. He was appointed Visiting Professor of Ophthalmology at the University of Padjadjaran in Indonesia. Sommer conducted a sequence of observational and intervention trials in Indonesia, and subsequently elsewhere, that led to his discovery that Vitamin A deficiency reduces immune responsiveness, and therefore resistance to deadly infectious diseases, especially diarrhea and measles.

Sommer was forced to repeat his experiments multiple times before convincing the scientific community of the importance of Vitamin A deficiency in contributing to the death and blindness of nearly a million children every year, and the effectiveness of one large oral dose of vitamin A, twice a year, in preventing these outcomes. Sommer solidified scientific support by organizing an international conference on the issue at the Rockefeller Foundation center for study in Bellagio, Italy. The scientists at the conference concluded that almost any intervention that substantially improved children's vitamin A status, including the use of twice yearly large dose capsules, which was the focus of Sommer's research, was shown to reduce the child mortality rate of these Vitamin A deficient children by as much as 34 percent. He also conducted studies in which he supplemented Nepalese women of childbearing age with Vitamin A/beta-carotene and observed a 45% reduction in the maternal mortality rate. Sommer and his colleagues conducted further trials on the impact of dosing newborn children in populations that were vitamin A deficient vitamin A supplementation in newborns, repeatedly demonstrating that it reduced newborn mortality by 10-20%.

=== Other pioneering discoveries ===
Sommer made a number of other discoveries that have led to major advances in global health care and policies, including demonstrating that measurement of mid-arm-circumference (MUAC) is a simple and effective tool for conducting nutritional surveillance and identifying children and populations at high risk of dying from malnutrition; that the easily assessed appearance of the nerve fiber layer in the retina is an early, accurate predictor of glaucomatous optic nerve damage indicating the need to initiate glaucoma therapy; and that vaccination for smallpox as long as 6 days after infection can prevent the disease, an observation that forestalled mass vaccination of primary responders following 9/11.

== Recognition ==
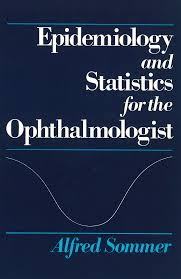
Book written by Alfred Sommer in 1980 to teach other Ophthalmologist how to do better clinical research

Alfred Sommer has received multiple awards for his research, including the Albert Lasker Award for Clinical Medical Research (1997), the Danone International Prize for Nutrition (2001), the Dan David Prize (2013), and the Helen Keller Prize for Vision Research, the Lucien Howe Medal of the American Ophthalmological Society, the Laureate Award of the American Academy of Ophthalmology (2011), the Duke Elder and Gonin Medals of the International Council of Ophthalmology, the Pollin Prize in Pediatric Research (Columbia University), the E.H. Christopherson Lectureship (American Academy of Pediatrics), the Prince Mahidol Award (from the King of Thailand), and the Warren Alpert Research Prize from Harvard Medical School in 2003, among other honors.

The 2005 PBS documentary Rx for Survival featured Sommer as a "global health champion." Several institutions around the world have bestowed honorary doctoral degrees to Dr. Sommer, including Johns Hopkins University and McGill University. Sommer is an elected member of both the National Academy of Sciences and the National Academy of Medicine.

== Current research interests ==
Sommer's current research interests include the diagnosis and management of glaucoma, improved child survival and blindness prevention strategies, and micronutrient interventions, in addition to other projects in both epidemiology and ophthalmology.

== Sommer Scholars and other Named Honors at JHSPH ==
In 2004, Michael Bloomberg, former chair of the Johns Hopkins University's board of trustees, donated $22 million to establish the Sommer Scholars Program at the Johns Hopkins Bloomberg School of Public Health in honor of Dr. Sommer. The programs aims to "recruit the next generation of public health leaders to devise new, effective interventions to improve global health." Additionally, as a consequence of gifts from other supporters, the Bloomberg School's Department of Molecular Microbiology is chaired by the "Alfred and Jill Sommer Professor"; the "Dana Center of the Wilmer Eye Institute is led by the "Alfred Sommer Professor of Ophthalmology"; and the main auditorium of the Bloomberg School is named "Sommer Hall."
