= Prince Mahidol Award =

International award for medicine and public health

- Awarded for: Outstanding achievements in medicine and public health
- Country: Thailand
- Presented by: Prince Mahidol Award Foundation
- First award: 1992; 34 years ago
- No. of laureates: 87 Laureates as of 2020
- Website: www.princemahidolaward.org

The Prince Mahidol Award (Thai: รางวัลสมเด็จเจ้าฟ้ามหิดล) is an annual award for outstanding achievements in medicine and public health worldwide. The award is given by the Prince Mahidol Award Foundation, which was founded by the Thai Royal Family in 1992.

== Prince Mahidol Award Foundation ==
King Bhumibol Adulyadej founded the Prince Mahidol Award Foundation on 1 January 1992 on the occasion of the 100th Anniversary of the birth of his father, Prince Mahidol Adulyadej, initially under the name "Mahidol Award Foundation", but since 28 July 1997 as "Prince Mahidol Award Foundation." In addition to the actual award, the Fund also promotes the memory of Prince Mahidol, who is regarded as the father of modern medicine and public health of Thailand. Princess Maha Chakri Sirindhorn is chairwoman of the Foundation Committee.

The award is given annually in two categories to international personalities or organizations:

- For outstanding progress in medicine
- For the active promotion of public health

and consists of:

- a medal
- a certificate
- prize money (US $100,000)

Between 1992 and 2014, 70 prizes were awarded, including 32 in medicine and 38 in public health.

=== Nomination process ===
1. Any individual or group of individuals may be nominated by a national governmental agency, or by an individual. Nominations are transmitted to the secretary-general of the Prince Mahidol Award Foundation.
2. The nomination forms are forwarded to the Scientific Advisory Committee for initial screening.
3. Once screened, the International Award Committee, which comprises several world-renowned experts in the fields of medicine and public health, will consider them and make recommendations to the Foundation’s Board of Trustees.
4. The Foundation’s Board of Trustees makes final approval.

=== Prince Mahidol Award Laureates ===
Source: Laureates

No.	Award year	Name	Flag	Country	Field	Note
1	1992	Sir William Richard Shaboe Doll	(United Kingdom)	United Kingdom	Medicine	deceased (July 24, 1997)
2	1992	Dr. Chen Minzhang	(China)	People's Republic of China	Public health	deceased (March 16, 1999)
3	1993	John B. Stanbury	(United States)	United States	Medicine	deceased (July 6, 2015)
4	1993	Dr. Ciro de Quadros	(Brazil)	Federal Republic of Brazil	Public health	deceased (May 28, 2014)
5	1994	Professor William Trager	(United States)	United States	Medicine	deceased (January 25, 1997)
6	1994	Dr. Ho Wang Lee	(South Korea)	Republic of Korea	Public health	deceased (July 5, 2022)
7	1995	Professor Egon Diczfalusy	(Sweden)	Sweden	Medicine	
8	1995	Professor Carl Djerassi	(United States)	United States	Medicine	
9	1995	Professor Frederick T. Sai	(Ghana)	Republic of Ghana	Public health	deceased (September 19, 2019)
10	1995	Dr. Nafis Sadik	(Pakistan)	Islamic Republic of Pakistan	Public health	
11	1996	Professor Dr. Prasong Tuchinda	(Thailand)	Thailand	Medicine	
12	1996	Dr. Suchitra Nimmannitya	(Thailand)	Thailand	Medicine	
13	1996	Professor Vincent P. Dole	(United States)	United States	Public health	
14	1997	Dr. Satoshi Omura	(Japan)	Japan	Medicine	
15	1997	Dr. P. Roy Vagelos	(United States)	United States	Medicine	
16	1997	Professor Alfred Sommer	(United States)	United States	Public health	
17	1997	Dr. Guillermo Arroyave	(Guatemala)	Guatemala	Public health	
18	1998	Dr. Rene Favaloro	(Argentina)	Republic of Argentina	Medicine	deceased (July 29, 2000)
19	1998	Dr. Harvey D. White	(New Zealand)	New Zealand	Medicine	
20	1998	Professor Kennedy F. Shortridge	(Australia)	Australia	Public health	
21	1998	Dr. Margaret F.C. Chan	(Hong Kong)	Hong Kong	Public health	
22	1999	Dr. R. Palmer Beasley	(United States)	United States	Medicine	
23	1999	Dr. Adetokunbo Oluwole Lucas	(Nigeria)	Federal Republic of Nigeria	Public health	
24	1999	Dr. Tore Godal	(Norway)	Kingdom of Norway	Public health	
25	2000	Professor Ernesto Pollitt	(Peru)	Peru	Medicine	
26	2000	Professor David JP Barker	(United Kingdom)	United Kingdom	Medicine	
27	2000	Sir Richard Peto	(United Kingdom)	United Kingdom	Public health	
28	2000	Sir Iain Geoffrey Chalmers	(United Kingdom)	United Kingdom	Public health	
29	2001	Sir David John Weatherall	(United Kingdom)	United Kingdom	Medicine	
30	2001	Professor Lam Sai Kit	(Malaysia)	Malaysia	Public health	
31	2001	Professor Barry J. Marshall	(Australia)	Australia	Public health	
32	2002	Professor Thomas E. Starzl	(United States)	United States	Medicine	
33	2002	Sir Roy Calne	(United Kingdom)	United Kingdom	Medicine	
34	2002	Dr. Maurice R. Hilleman	(United States)	United States	Public health	
35	2002	Dr. P. Helena Makela	(Finland)	Republic of Finland	Public health	
36	2003	Professor Herbert L. Needleman	(United States)	United States	Public health	
37	2003	China Cooperative Research Group	(China)	People's Republic of China	Medicine	on Qinghaosu and its derivatives as Antimalarials
38	2004	Professor Norman Sartorius	(Germany)	Federal Republic of Germany	Medicine	
39	2004	Professor Jonathan M. Samet	(United States)	United States	Public health	
40	2005	Professor Harald Zur Hausen	(Germany)	Federal Republic of Germany	Public health	
41	2005	Professor Eugene Goldwasser	(United States)	United States	Medicine	
42	2006	Professor Stanley G. Schultz	(United States)	United States	Medicine	deceased (October 23, 2014)
43	2006	Dr. Richard A. Cash	(United States)	United States	Public health	
44	2006	Dr. David R. Nalin	(United States)	United States	Public health	
45	2006	Dr. Dilip Mahalanabis	(India)	India	Public health	
46	2007	Professor Basil Stuart Hetzel	(Australia)	Australia	Public health	
47	2007	Dr. Sanduk Ruit	(Nepal)	Kingdom of Nepal	Public health	
48	2007	Professor Dr. Axel Ullrich	(Germany)	Federal Republic of Germany	Medicine	
49	2008	Professor Sergio Henrique Ferreira	(Brazil)	Federal Republic of Brazil	Medicine	
50	2008	Professor Michiaki Takahashi	(Japan)	Japan	Public health	
51	2008	Professor Yu Yongxin	(China)	People's Republic of China	Public health	
52	2009	Professor Anne Mills	(United Kingdom)	United Kingdom	Medicine	
53	2009	Wiwat Rojanapithayakorn	(Thailand)	Thailand	Public health	
54	2009	Mechai Viravaidya	(Thailand)	Thailand	Public health	
55	2010	Robert E. Black	(United States)	United States	Public health	
56	2010	Kenneth H. Brown	(United States)	United States	Public health	
57	2010	Kevin Marsh	(United Kingdom)	United Kingdom	Medicine	
58	2010	Ananda Shiv Prasad	(United States)	United States	Public health	
59	2010	Nicholas J. White	(United Kingdom)	United Kingdom	Medicine	
60	2011	Ruth F. Bishop	(Australia)	Australia	Public health	
61	2011	Aaron T. Beck	(United States)	United States	Medicine	
62	2011	David T. Wong	(United States)	United States	Medicine	
63	2012	Michael David Rawlins	(United Kingdom)	United Kingdom	Medicine	
64	2012	Uche Veronica Amazigo	(Nigeria)	Federal Republic of Nigeria	Public health	
65	2013	Jim Yong Kim	(United States)	United States	Public health	
66	2013	David D. Ho	(United States)	United States	Medicine	
67	2013	Anthony Fauci	(United States)	United States	Medicine	
68	2013	Peter Piot	(Belgium)	Belgium	Public health	
69	2014	Donald A. Henderson	(United States)	United States	Public Health	
70	2014	Akiro Endo	(Japan)	Japan	Medicine	
71	2015	Michael Gideon Marmot	(United Kingdom)	United Kingdom	Public Health	
72	2015	Morton M. Mower	(United States)	United States	Medicine	
73	2016	Vladimir Hachinski	(Canada)	Canada	Public Health	
74	2016	Sir Gregory Paul Winter	(United Kingdom)	United Kingdom	Medicine	
75	2017	Rachel Schneerson	(United States)	United States	Public Health	
76	2017	Porter W. Anderson Jr.	(United States)	United States	Public Health	
77	2017	Mathuram Santosham	(United States)	United States	Public Health	
78	2017	John B. Robbins	(United States)	United States	Public Health	
79	2017	Human Genome Project			Medicine	
80	2018	John D. Clemens	(United States)	United States	Public Health	
81	2018	Jan R. Holmgren	(Sweden)	Sweden	Public Health	
82	2018	Mary-Claire King	(United Kingdom)	United Kingdom	Medicine	
83	2018	Brian J. Druker	(United States)	United States	Medicine	
84	2019	Ralf Bartenschlager	(Germany)	Germany	Medicine	
85	2019	David Mabey	(United Kingdom)	United Kingdom	Public Health	
86	2020	Valentín Fuster	(United States)	United States	Medicine	
87	2020	Bernard Pécoul	(France)	France	Public Health	
88	2021	Katalin Karikó	(Hungary)	Hungary	Medicine	
89	2021	Drew Weissman	(United States)	United States	Medicine	
90	2021	Pieter Cullis	(Canada)	Canada	Medicine	
91	2022	Ralph DeFronzo	(United States)	United States	Medicine	
92	2022	Ian Frazer	(Australia) (United Kingdom)	Australia / United Kingdom	Public health	
93	2022	John T. Schiller	(United States)	United States	Public health	
94	2022	Douglas R. Lowy	(United States)	United States	Public health	
95	2023	Napoleone Ferrara	(Italy) (United States)	Italy / United States	Medicine	
96	2023	Barry Rumack	(United States)	United States	Public Health	
97	2024	Anthony R. Hunter	(United Kingdom) (United States)	United Kingdom / United States	Medicine	
98	2024	Jonathan Shepherd	(United Kingdom)	United Kingdom	Public Health	
99	2025	Terry D. King	(United States)	United States	Medicine	
100	2025	Walter Willett	(United States)	United States	Public Health	

== See also ==
- List of medicine awards
- List of prizes named after people
