= Dr. Nathan Davis Awards =

American Medical Association Awards for Outstanding Government Service
- Awarded for: Significant accomplishments to advance public health
- Country: United States
- Presented by: American Medical Association (AMA)
- First award: 1989; 37 years ago
- Website: www.ama-assn.org/about/awards/american-medical-association-awards-outstanding-government-service

The Dr. Nathan Davis Awards are presented annually by the American Medical Association (AMA) and awarded to elected and career public servants in national, state, and local governments for outstanding government service. These awards are named for the founder of the American Medical Association, Nathan Smith Davis.

The first Dr. Nathan Davis Awards were presented in 1989. Since then a number of prominent individuals have received a Dr. Nathan Davis Award for outstanding government service.

== United States Senator ==
- 1989 Lowell P. Weicker, Jr., Connecticut
- 1990 Orrin G. Hatch, Utah, Edward M. Kennedy, Massachusetts
- 1991 John D. Rockefeller, IV, West Virginia
- 1992 Dale Bumpers, Arkansas, Bob Dole, Kansas
- 1993 Christopher Dodd, Connecticut
- 1994 John H. Chafee, Rhode Island
- 1995 Mark O. Hatfield, Oregon
- 1996 Connie Mack, Florida
- 1997 Mike DeWine, Ohio
- 1998 John McCain, Arizona
- 1999 John B. Breaux, Louisiana
- 2001 Richard J. Durbin, Illinois
- 2002 Dianne Feinstein, California
- 2003 Pete V. Domenici, New Mexico
- 2004 William H. Frist, Tennessee
- 2005 Max Baucus, Montana, Chuck Grassley, Iowa
- 2006 Jon Kyl, Arizona
- 2007 Gordon H. Smith, Oregon
- 2008 Tom Harkin, Iowa
- 2009 Edward M. Kennedy, Massachusetts
- 2012 Debbie Stabenow, Michigan
- 2015 Irene Aguilar, Colorado
- 2017 John Barrasso, Wyoming
- 2019 Lamar Alexander, Tennessee
- 2022 Roy Blunt, Missouri

== United States Representative ==
- 1989 Henry A. Waxman, California
- 1990 William H. Natcher, Kentucky
- 1991 J. Roy Rowland, Georgia, C. W. "Bill" Young, Florida
- 1992 Charles B. Rangel, New York
- 1993 Charles W. Stenholm, Texas
- 1994 Nancy Johnson, Connecticut
- 1995 Bill Archer, Texas
- 1996 John Edward Porter, Illinois
- 1997 Marge Roukema, New Jersey
- 1998 Greg Ganske, MD, Iowa, Louis Stokes, Ohio
- 1999 Benjamin L. Cardin, Maryland
- 2000 John D. Dingell, Michigan, Charlie Norwood, Georgia
- 2001 Michael Bilirakis, Florida
- 2002 Constance A. Morella, Maryland
- 2003 James C. Greenwood, Pennsylvania
- 2004 William M. Thomas, California
- 2006 J. Dennis Hastert, Illinois
- 2007 Sherrod Brown, Ohio
- 2008 Steny H. Hoyer, Maryland
- 2009 Nathan Deal, Georgia
- 2010 Donna Christensen, U.S. Virgin Islands
- 2011 Rosa L. DeLauro, Connecticut
- 2012 Allyson Y. Schwartz, Pennsylvania
- 2014 Fred Upton, Michigan
- 2015 Michael C. Burgess, Texas
- 2016 John Boehner, Ohio; and Nancy Pelosi, California
- 2017 Phil Roe, Tennessee; and John Nygren, Wisconsin
- 2020 Raul Ruiz, California
- 2023 Kevin Brady, Texas
- 2024 Larry Bucshon, Indiana

== Member of the Executive Branch by Presidential Appointment ==
- 1989 C. Everett Koop, Surgeon General of the United States
- 1990 Louis W. Sullivan, Secretary of Health and Human Services
- 1991 Margaret M. Heckler, former Secretary of Health and Human Services
- 1992 Antonia C. Novello, Surgeon General of the United States
- 1993 Philip R. Lee, Assistant Secretary for Health, Health and Human Services
- 1994 J. Jarrett Clinton, former Assistant Secretary of Defense, Regional Health Administrator, Region V, Georgia
- 1996 David Satcher, Director, Center for Disease Control and Prevention
- 1997 Donna Shalala, Secretary, U.S. Department of Health and Human Services
- 1998 Kenneth W. Kizer, Under Secretary for Health, U.S. Department of Veterans Affairs
- 1999 Ricardo Martinez, Administrator, National Highway Traffic Safety Administration
- 2000 John M. Eisenberg, Director, Agency for Healthcare Research and Quality, U.S. Department of Health and Human Services
- 2001 Jeffrey P. Koplan, Director, Centers for Disease Control and Prevention
- 2002 William H. Foege, Former Director, Centers for Disease Control and Prevention
- 2003 Tommy Thompson, Secretary, Department of Health and Human Services
- 2004 Mark B. McClellan, Commissioner, Food and Drug Administration
- 2005 William Winkenwerder, Jr., Assistant Secretary of Defense for Health Affairs
- 2006 Carolyn Clancy, Director, Agency for Healthcare Research and Quality
- 2007 Margaret J. Giannini, Director, Office on Disability, US Department of Health and Human Services
- 2009 Jeffrey William Runge, President, Biologue, Inc.
- 2010 Vice Admiral John Mateczun, Commander, Joint Task Force, National Capital Region Medical
- 2011 R. Gil Kerlikowske, Commander, Director, White House Office of National Drug Control Policy
- 2013 Donald Berwick, former Administrator of the Centers for Medicare and Medicaid Services
- 2015 Bruce G. Gellin, Deputy Assistant Secretary for Health Director, National Vaccine Program Office, Office of the Assistant Secretary for Health, U.S. Department of Health and Human Services
- 2017 Andrew M. Slavitt, Acting Administrator, Centers for Medicare & Medicaid Services
- 2019 Scott Gottlieb, Commissioner, U.S. Food and Drug Administration
- 2023 Rahul Gupta, Director, White House Office of National Drug Control Policy
- 2024 Michael Osterholm, Director, Center for Infectious Disease Research and Policy, University of Minnesota

== Member of the Executive Branch in Career Public Service ==
- 1989 Donald A. B. Lindberg, Director, Library of Medicine, NIH, Ruth L. Kirschstein, MD, Director, National Institute of General Medical Sciences, NIH
- 1991 William F. Raub, former Deputy Director, NIH
- 1992 Anthony S. Fauci, Director, National Institute of Allergy and Infectious Diseases; Director, Office of AIDS Research
- 1993 Samuel Broder, Director, National Cancer Institute, NIH
- 1994 Donald L. Custis, former Surgeon General of the Navy, former Chief Medical Director of Department of Veterans Affairs
- 1995 Kenneth P. Moritsugu, Assistant Surgeon General and Medical Director, Federal Bureau of Prisons
- 1996 Edgar R. Anderson, Jr., former Surgeon General of the U.S. Air Force
- 1997 Kevin R. Kerrigan, Naval Hospital, North Charleston, South Carolina
- 1998 Claude J.M. Lenfant, Director, National Heart, Lung and Blood Institute National Institutes of Health
- 1999 Rear Admiral Michael L. Cowan, Deputy Director for Medical Readiness, The Joint Staff, Janet Woodcock, Director, Center for Drug Evaluation and Research, Food and Drug Administration
- 2000 Marilyn H. Gaston, Assistant Surgeon General, Associate Administrator Bureau of Primary Health, U.S. Public Health Service, Gerald Fischbach, Director, National Institute of Neurological Disorders and Stroke, National Institutes of Health
- 2001 James P. Bagian, Director, VA National Center for Patient Safety Department of Veterans Affairs
- 2002 Joseph F. Fraumeni, Jr., Director, Division of Cancer Epidemiology and Genetics National Cancer Institute
- 2003 Judith Elaine Fradkin, Director, Division of Diabetes, Endocrinology and Metabolic Diseases, National Institute of Diabetes and Kidney Diseases, National Institutes of Health
- 2004 Duane F. Alexander, Director, National Institute of Child Health and Human Development National Institutes of Health
- 2005 Vice Admiral James A. Zimble, (USN Ret.), President Emeritus, Uniformed Services University of the Health Sciences
- 2006 Christopher Allan Percy, Medical Officer and Director of Community Health Services, Northern Navajo Medical Center
- 2007 Douglas R. Lowy, Chief, Laboratory of Cellular Oncology, Center for Cancer Research, National Cancer Institute, National Institutes of Health, John T. Schiller, PhD, Principal Investigator, Neoplastic Disease Section, Laboratory of Cellular Oncology, Center for Cancer Research, National Cancer Institute, National Institutes of Health
- 2008 W. Marston Linehan, Chief, Urologic Oncology Branch Center for Cancer Research National Cancer Institute
- 2009 D. Joe Boone, Associate Director for Science, Division of Laboratory Systems National Center for Preparedness, Detection and Control of Infectious Diseases Centers for Disease Control and Prevention
- 2010 Ira Pastan, Chief of the Molecular Biology Laboratory, National Institute of Health’s Center for Cancer Research
- 2011 William A. Gahl, Clinical Director, National Human Genome Research Institute, Director, intramural program of the National Institutes of Health Office of Rare Diseases, Director, National Institutes of Health Undiagnosed Diseases Program
- 2012 Leon Esterowitz, Program Director, Biophotonics Directorate for Engineering, National Science Foundation
- 2013 Thomas R. Insel, Director, National Institute of Mental Health
- 2014 Paul K. Carlton, Jr., Lt. Gen., United States Air Force (Ret.)
- 2015 Dale P. Sandler, Senior Investigator, Epidemiology Branch/Chronic Disease Epidemiology Group, National Institutes of Environmental Health Sciences
- 2016 Karen Midthun, Director, Center for Biologics Evaluation and Research
- 2017 Janine Austin Clayton, Associate Director for Research on Women’s Health and Director of the Office of Research on Women’s Health, National Institutes of Health; and Patrick Conway, Deputy Administrator for Innovation and Quality and Chief Medical Officer, Centers for Medicare & Medicaid Services
- 2018 Michael Marc Gottesman, Deputy Director, Intramural Research Lab Chief, Center for Cancer Research National Institutes of Health
- 2019 Steven A. Rosenberg, Chief, Surgery Branch, National Cancer Institute
- 2020 Nora D. Volkow, Director, National Institute on Drug Abuse, National Institutes of Health and Martha Sedegah, Director, Clinical Immunology and Parasitology, Malaria Department, Naval Medical Research Center
- 2021 Darlene Chee, CEO Indian Health Service, Navajo Area Chinle Comprehensive Healthcare Facility
- 2022 Peter Marks, Director, Center for Biologics Evaluation and Research U.S. Food and Drug Administration
- 2023 Debra Houry, Chief Medical Officer and Deputy Director of Program and Science, Centers for Disease Control and Prevention
- 2024 Russell S. Thomas, Director, Center for Computational Toxicology and Exposure in the Office of Research and Development, United States Environmental Protection Agency

== Member of the Executive Branch of the Federal Government in Career Military Service ==
- 2000 Lieutenant General Ronald R. Blanck, Surgeon General of the Army, Rear Admiral Joyce Johnson, DO, MA, Director of Health and Safety, United States Coast Guard
- 2002 Lieutenant General Paul K. Carlton, Jr., Surgeon General, United States Air Force, Captain Daniel Carucci, MD, Director, Malaria Program, Naval Medical Research Center, United States Navy
- 2003 Captain Daniel Carucci, Director, Malaria Program, Naval Medical Research Center, United States Navy
- 2011 Vice Admiral Adam M. Robinson, Jr., Surgeon General, United States Navy
- 2012 Lieutenant General Eric B. Schoomaker, Surgeon General and Command General, USA MEDCOM, United States Army
- 2013 Major General Kimberly Siniscalchi, Assistant Surgeon General, Air Force
- 2018 Lt. General Mark A. Ediger, Surgeon General, United States Air Force

== Governor or Statewide Elected Official ==
- 1989 William Donald Schaefer, Governor, Maryland
- 1993 Brereton C. Jones, Governor, Kentucky
- 1994 Mike Leavitt, Governor, Utah
- 1995 Parris Glendening, Governor, Maryland
- 1996 Pierre Howard, Lieutenant Governor, Georgia
- 1997 George Pataki, Governor, New York, Mike Moore, Attorney General, Mississippi
- 1998 Howard Dean, Governor, Vermont
- 1999 Christine Todd Whitman, Governor, New Jersey
- 2000 Mel Carnahan, Governor, Missouri
- 2001 Richard Blumenthal, Attorney General, Connecticut
- 2002 John Oxendine, Commissioner of Insurance and Fire Safety, Georgia
- 2004 Jeb Bush, Governor, State of Florida
- 2005 Drew Edmondson, Attorney General, State of Oklahoma
- 2006 Susan Combs, Commissioner, Texas Department of Agriculture, Joe Manchin, Governor, State of West Virginia
- 2008 Jodi Rell, Governor, State of Connecticut
- 2009 Rick Perry, Governor, State of Texas
- 2010 John Baldacci, Governor, State of Maine, Sandy Praeger, Commissioner, Kansas Insurance Department
- 2013 Anthony Brown, Maryland Lieutenant Governor
- 2015 Mike Beebe, Governor, State of Arkansas
- 2016 Lieutenant General Thomas W. Travis, (Ret.), 21st Air Force Surgeon General, United States Air Force
- 2017 Dave Jones, Insurance Commissioner, California
- 2018 Josh Shapiro, Attorney General, The Commonwealth of Pennsylvania
- 2019 Charlie Baker, Governor, The Commonwealth of Massachusetts
- 2020 Larry Hogan, Governor, The State of Maryland

== See also ==
- List of awards for contributions to society
