= Maura L. Gillison =

American medical oncologist and molecular epidemiologist

- Born: January 4, 1965; London, Ontario, Canada
- Died: June 21, 2026 (aged 61); Willoughby, Ohio, U.S.
- Spouse: David E. Symer (m. 1992)
- Children: 2

Academic background
- Education: BSc, Zoology, 1987, Duke University; MD, 1991, Johns Hopkins University School of Medicine; PhD, 2001, Johns Hopkins Bloomberg School of Public Health
- Thesis: Evidence for a causal association between human papillomavirus and a subset of head and neck cancers (2001)

Academic work
- Institutions: MD Anderson Cancer Center; Ohio State University Comprehensive Cancer Center; Johns Hopkins University

Maura Lianne Gillison (January 4, 1965 – June 21, 2026) was an American medical oncologist and molecular epidemiologist. She is credited as the first investigator to establish a definitive connection between HPV and oral cancer.

== Early life and education ==
Gillison was born in London, Ontario, on January 4, 1965, and moved frequently with her family in the United States and Mexico. She graduated from Hathaway Brown School in Shaker Heights, Ohio, in 1983. She completed her Bachelor of Science degree in zoology from Duke University before moving to Maryland to attend the Johns Hopkins University School of Medicine (JHUSOM), from which she received her medical degree in 1991.

Gillison completed her internship in internal medicine at Johns Hopkins Hospital in 1993 and medical residency training at Massachusetts General Hospital in Boston, Massachusetts, in 1995. She returned to Baltimore in 1996 for clinical fellowship training in medical oncology at the Johns Hopkins Oncology Center. She attended the Graduate Training Program in Clinical Investigation at the Johns Hopkins Bloomberg School of Public Health, from which she received the PhD degree in 2001.

As a graduate student in Professor Keerti Shah's laboratory, Gillison wrote a landmark paper published in 2000 in the Journal of the National Cancer Institute which demonstrated a link between human papillomavirus virus (HPV)-16 and oropharyngeal cancers. She is credited as the first investigator to establish a connection between HPV and oral cancer. She later stated that although the paper impacted her entire career, she was "having so much fun that I didn’t realize its implications". Following her time at JHU, Gillison was inducted as a member of Delta Omega, an honorary society for studies in public health.

== Career ==
Following publication of her landmark 2000 study, Gillison was the senior author of the groundbreaking 2007 New England Journal of Medicine study "Case–Control Study of Human Papillomavirus and Oropharyngeal Cancer" showing that HPV 16 infection results in head and neck squamous cell carcinoma (HNSCCs) in both men and women, and that having multiple oral sex partners increases the risk for developing these cancers. The following year, Gillison and her research team described distinct risk factor profiles for HPV16–positive and HPV16–negative HNSCCs.

Gillison was recruited from Johns Hopkins in 2009 to join the Ohio State University Comprehensive Cancer Center with research grants from the National Cancer Institute (NCI). In the same year, she presented data at the American Society of Clinical Oncology (ASCO) conference showing that HPV is the most important predictor of clinical response to tumor therapy and prognosis for patients with these cancers. As a result of her work, the NCI recommended that clinical trials in HNSCC stratify tumors by HPV status.

Gillison advocated for inclusion of boys and men in anti-HPV vaccination efforts. She stated: "The time has come to have a more thorough discussion about the potential benefits of HPV vaccines in boys … When my patients ask whether they should vaccinate their sons [with the HPV vaccine], I say ‘certainly’. The vaccine will protect them against genital warts and anal cancer and—as a potential by-product of that—it may protect them against oral cancer caused by HPV … The time has come to consider offering the HPV vaccine to boys." She and her colleagues subsequently showed that the HPV vaccine dramatically reduced the prevalence of oral HPV infections in vaccinated vs unvaccinated men.

She was inducted into the American Society for Clinical Investigation. She was also honored by the American Association for Cancer Research with the 2012 Richard and Hinda Rosenthal Memorial Award.

As the Jeg Coughlin Chair in Cancer Research, professor in the division of medical oncology, and member of the cancer control program at the Ohio State University Comprehensive Cancer Center, Gillison was elected a member of the National Academy of Medicine. She was also inducted into JHU's Society of Scholars in 2016.

In 2017, Gillison joined the MD Anderson Cancer Center to continue her research into HPV-caused cancers. She continued to investigate the genetic and genomic changes induced by HPV that transform human cells, and studied immunological responses to HPV-associated cancers, to improve anti-cancer therapies.

Gillison was inducted into the 2020 class of Giants of Cancer Care, awarded for Translational Science.

She was the recipient of the 2021 David A. Karnofsky Memorial Award and Lecture from American Society of Clinical Oncology.

In 2024, Gillison was awarded the Potu N. Rao Award for Excellence in Basic Science at University of Texas MD Anderson Cancer Center in Houston, Texas.

In December 2025, Gillison was awarded the VinFuture Grand Prize together with laureates Drs. Douglas R. Lowy, John T. Schiller and Aimée R. Kreimer of the U.S. National Cancer Institute, in Hanoi, Vietnam.

== Personal life and death ==
Gillison married David E. Symer in 1992; he is an oncologist and physician-scientist. They had two daughters. She died in Willoughby, Ohio, on June 21, 2026, from cancer of the small intestine.
