= VinFuture Prize =

Prizes established by Phạm Nhật Vượng in 2020

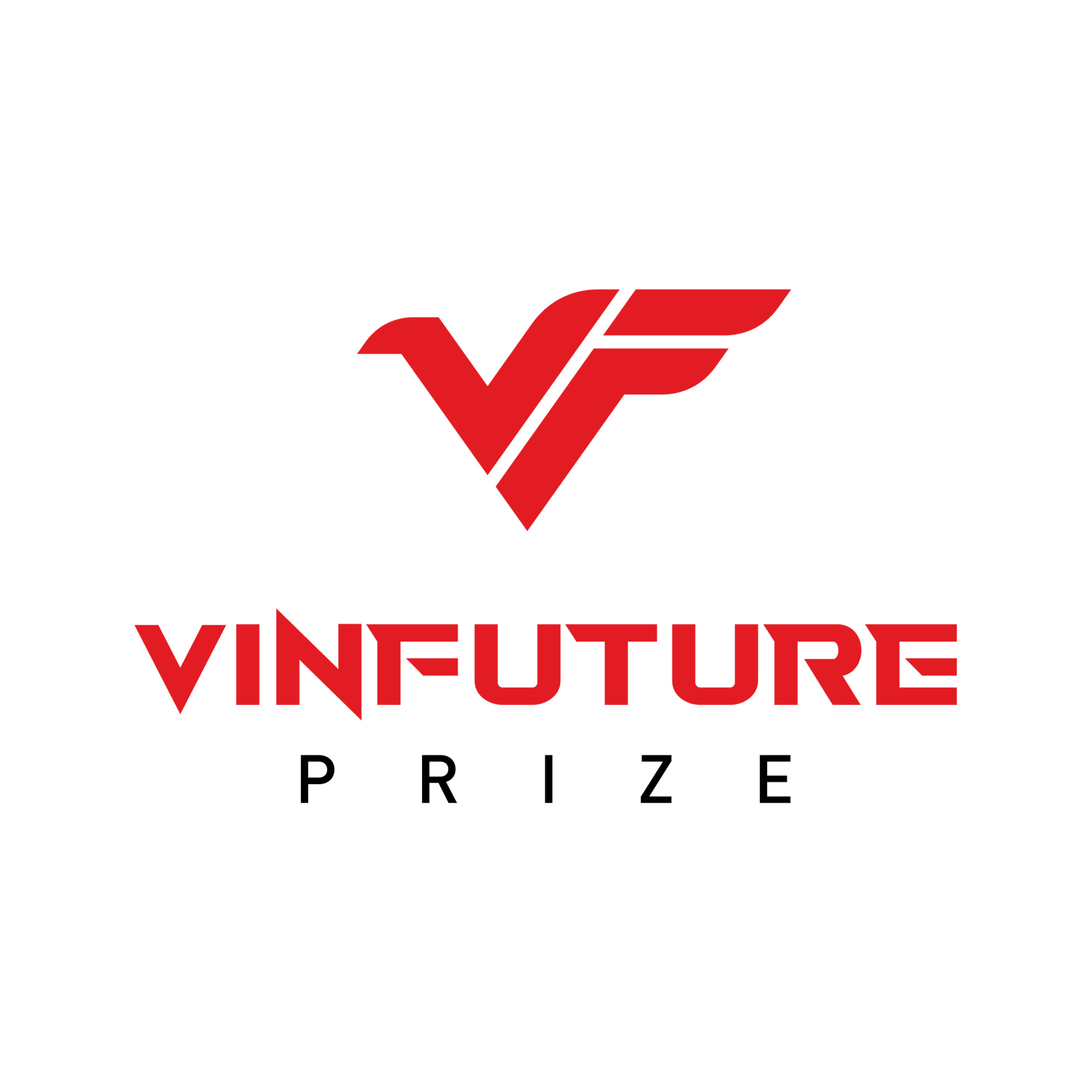
- Awarded for: Scientific discoveries and technological innovations
- Country: Vietnam
- Presented by: The VinFuture Foundation
- Rewards: The VinFuture Grand Prize awards 70 billion VND, approx. 3 million US$, and three special prizes for Women Innovators, Innovators from Developing Countries, and Emerging Field Innovators - each valued at $500,000 US (2021)
- First award: 2021
- Website: vinfutureprize.org

The VinFuture Prize is an annual international award established in 2020 by the Vietnam-based VinFuture Foundation. The foundation aims to promote research in health, technology, and sustainability.

== Founders ==
The VinFuture Foundation was founded in 2020 by Phạm Nhật Vượng (founder of Vingroup) with his wife, Phạm Thu Hương. The organization operates as an independent nonprofit entity with the stated mission of recognizing research in line with the United Nations’ Sustainable Development Goals (SDGs).

== Prize Council ==
The VinFuture Foundation Prize Council is responsible for setting criteria, evaluating laureates, and selecting winners in recognition of research that "has or will have the potential to bring solutions that can be applied to the everyday life of ordinary people."

The Prize Council is chaired by Sir Richard Henry Friend, the Cavendish Professor of Physics at the University of Cambridge, and includes members from international universities and research institutions.

=== Members ===
- Prof. Pascale Cossart, FRS (Pasteur Institute, Paris, France)
- Prof. Van-Chi Dang (Ludwig Institute for Cancer Research; Johns Hopkins University, United States)
- Prof. Martin Andrew Green (University of New South Wales, Australia)
- Prof. Daniel Kammen (University of California, Berkeley, United States)
- Prof. Sir Konstantin (Kostya) S. Novoselov, FRS (University of Manchester, United Kingdom)
- Prof. Thalappil Pradeep, (Indian Institute of Technology Madras, India)
- Prof. Pamela Ronald (University of California, Davis, United States)
- Prof. Daniela Rus (Massachusetts Institute of Technology, United States)
- Prof. Leslie Gabriel Valiant, FRS (Harvard University, United States)

=== Honorary members ===
There are 15 honorary members recognized for strategic advisory roles, including Prof. Susan Solomon, Prof. Albert P. Pisano, Dr. Xuedong Huang, Prof. Myles Allen, Prof. Jennifer Tour Chayes, Prof. Gérard Albert Mourou, Prof. Michael Eugene Porter, and Prof. Soumitra Dutta.

== The VinFuture Prize Pre-Screening Committee ==
The Pre-Screening Committee is responsible for identifying and reviewing qualified nominees based on the selection criteria established by the Prize Council, as well as preparing and presenting supporting documents for the shortlist to the Prize Council.

=== Members ===
- Prof. Thuc-Quyen Nguyen (University of California, Santa Barbara, United States)
- Prof. Ngoc-Minh Do (University of Illinois Urbana-Champaign, United States; VinUniversity, Vietnam)
- Prof. Ana Belén Elgoyhen (University of Buenos Aires, Argentina)
- Dr. Filippo Giorgi (Abdus Salam International Centre for Theoretical Physics, Italy)
- Prof. Quarraisha Abdool Karim, FRS (Center for the AIDS Programme of Research in South Africa, South Africa)
- Prof. Ermias Kebreab (University of California, Davis, United States)
- Dr. Jayshree Seth (3M, Minnesota, United States)
- Prof. Ingolf Steffan-Dewenter (University of Würzburg, Germany)
- Prof. Fiona Watt (European Molecular Biology Organization, Germany)
- Prof. Vivian Yam (University of Hong Kong, Hong Kong, PRC)

=== Honorary members ===
- Prof. Hans Joachim Schellnhuber
- Prof. Mônica Alonso Cotta
- Prof. Alta Schutte
- Prof. Albert P. Pisano
- Prof. Myles Allen
- Mr. Akihisa Kakimoto
- Prof. Duc-Thu Nguyen
- Prof. Molly Shoichet
- Mr. Truong Quoc Hung
- Prof. Trac D. Tran
- Dr. Bui Hai Hung

== Award process ==
=== Nomination ===
Nominations are compiled and qualified by the VinFuture Prize Secretaries before the pre-screening round, which includes experts in natural science, health science, earth science, environmental science, computer science, material science, engineering, agriculture, technology, artificial intelligence, renewable energy, biotechnology, environmental conservation, and other fields.

The nominations are evaluated by the VinFuture Prize Pre-Screening Committee, based on three core criteria:

- Scientific and technological advancement
- Meaningful changes in people's lives
- Scale of impact and sustainability

Candidates must adhere to the List of 17 Sustainable Development Goals of the United Nations.

=== Selection ===
Four scientific discoveries that improve human lives and enhance fairness and sustainability for future generations have been selected by the VinFuture Prize Council. A Grand Prize and three special prizes are awarded annually. The prize winners are announced at the VinFuture Prize Award Ceremony. The Grand Prize awards $3 million in funding, and the special prizes award $500,000 in funding to each winner based on the following categories:

- Special Prize for an excellent researcher or innovator from a developing-nation institute.
- Special Prize for an outstanding female researcher or innovator.
- Special Prize for groundbreaking discovery or invention in an emerging field of science or technology that has the potential to make a substantial beneficial impact on mankind in the future.

== Award ceremony ==
The VinFuture Sci-Tech Week and Award Ceremony are held annually, aiming to foster connections between Vietnam's scientific and technological communities and the global community.

=== Performers ===
VinFuture has invited international artists to perform, with the performance being broadcast on VTV (Vietnam Television).

List of VinFuture international performers
Year of ceremony	Artist	Performed work	City	Venue
2021	John Legend	"You Deserve It All" "All of Me" "Imagine"	Hanoi	Hanoi Opera House
2022	Christina Aguilera	"Beautiful" "The Voice Within" "A Million Dreams"	Hanoi	Hanoi Opera House
2023	Katy Perry	"Unconditionally" "Roar" "Firework"	Hanoi	Hồ Gươm Opera
2024	Imagine Dragons	"Believer" "Whatever It Takes" "Walking the Wire"	Hanoi	Hồ Gươm Opera
2025	Alicia Keys	"If I Ain't Got You" "Girl On Fire" "Good Job"	Hanoi	Hồ Gươm Opera

=== The Sci-Tech Week ===
The VinFuture Sci-Tech Week brings together scientists, politicians, and entrepreneurs from around the world. Scientists gather in Vietnam to participate in the four main events of the VinFuture Sci-Tech Week: a conversation with the Prize Council and Pre-screening Committee, a "Science for Life" Symposium, the inaugural VinFuture Award Ceremony, and a Scientific Dialogue with the inaugural VinFuture Prize Laureates.

=== The VinFuture Award Ceremony ===
The VinFuture Award Ceremony is a formal event attended by Vietnamese government leaders, scientists, and recipients of scientific honors such as the Nobel Prize, Millennium Technology Prize, Turing Award, and others. The award ceremony is broadcast live on local and global science and technology platforms.

== Laureates ==
Year	Ceremony Date	Prize name	Laureate	Nationality	Notes
2021	20 January 2022	Grand Prize	Katalin Karikó	Hungary; United States	Significant contributions to the development of mRNA vaccination technology.
2021	20 January 2022	Grand Prize	Drew Weissman	United States	Significant contributions to the development of mRNA vaccination technology.
2021	20 January 2022	Grand Prize	Pieter Cullis	Canada	Significant contributions to the development of mRNA vaccination technology.
2021	20 January 2022	Woman Innovator	Zhenan Bao	United States	Research on electronic skins that can stretch and heal like normal skins while also being biodegradable.
2021	20 January 2022	Innovators from Developing Countries	Salim Abdool Karim	South Africa	Development of a tenofovir gel that can be used to prevent HIV infection in women.
2021	20 January 2022	Innovators from Developing Countries	Quarraisha Abdool Karim	South Africa	Development of a tenofovir gel that can be used to prevent HIV infection in women.
2021	20 January 2022	Innovators with Outstanding Achievements in Emerging Field	Omar M. Yaghi	United States	Designing and synthesizing new types of reticular compounds such as metal-organic frameworks (MOFs), zeolitic imidazolate frameworks (ZIFs), and covalent organic frameworks (COFs).
2022	20 December 2022	Grand Prize	Tim Berners-Lee	United Kingdom	Ground-breaking research on global network technology, allowing all forms of information to be reliably communicated, transferred, and shared at the speed of light.
2022	20 December 2022	Grand Prize	Vint Cerf	United States	Ground-breaking research on global network technology, allowing all forms of information to be reliably communicated, transferred, and shared at the speed of light.
2022	20 December 2022	Grand Prize	Emmanuel Desurvire	France	Ground-breaking research on global network technology, allowing all forms of information to be reliably communicated, transferred, and shared at the speed of light.
2022	20 December 2022	Grand Prize	Bob Kahn	United States	Ground-breaking research on global network technology, allowing all forms of information to be reliably communicated, transferred, and shared at the speed of light.
2022	20 December 2022	Grand Prize	David N. Payne	United Kingdom	Ground-breaking research on global network technology, allowing all forms of information to be reliably communicated, transferred, and shared at the speed of light.
2022	20 December 2022	Woman Innovator	Pamela Ronald	United States	Breakthroughs in isolating the Sub1A gene, which facilitated the development of submergence-tolerant rice varieties, helping feed millions of people in South and Southeast Asia.
2022	20 December 2022	Innovators from Developing Countries	Thalappil Pradeep	India	Development of a low-cost filtration system to remove arsenic and other heavy metals from groundwater, helping hundreds of millions of people around the world living with contaminated water get access to clean water.
2022	20 December 2022	Innovators with Outstanding Achievements in Emerging Field	Demis Hassabis	United Kingdom	Pioneering work on AlphaFold 2, an artificial intelligence program that has revolutionized the modeling of protein structures, accelerating advances in biomedicine, health, and agriculture.
2022	20 December 2022	Innovators with Outstanding Achievements in Emerging Field	John Jumper	United Kingdom	Pioneering work on AlphaFold 2, an artificial intelligence program that has revolutionized the modeling of protein structures, accelerating advances in biomedicine, health, and agriculture.
2023	20 December 2023	Grand Prize	Martin Green	Australia	Revolutionary innovations that contribute to establishing a sustainable foundation for green energy by utilizing solar cells for production and Lithium-ion batteries for storage.
2023	20 December 2023	Grand Prize	M. Stanley Whittingham	United States	Revolutionary innovations that contribute to establishing a sustainable foundation for green energy by utilizing solar cells for production and Lithium-ion batteries for storage.
2023	20 December 2023	Grand Prize	Rachid Yazami	Morocco	Revolutionary innovations that contribute to establishing a sustainable foundation for green energy by utilizing solar cells for production and Lithium-ion batteries for storage.
2023	20 December 2023	Grand Prize	Akira Yoshino	Japan	Revolutionary innovations that contribute to establishing a sustainable foundation for green energy by utilizing solar cells for production and Lithium-ion batteries for storage.
2023	20 December 2023	Woman Innovator	Susan Solomon	United States	Uncovering the mechanism of ozone depletion in Antarctica, which played a key role in the development of the Montreal Protocol.
2023	20 December 2023	Innovators from Developing Countries	Gurdev Khush	United States	Noteworthy efforts in developing and promoting disease-resistant rice varieties, such as IR36 and IR64, thereby safeguarding global food security.
2023	20 December 2023	Innovators from Developing Countries	Võ Tòng Xuân	Vietnam	Noteworthy efforts in developing and promoting disease-resistant rice varieties, such as IR36 and IR64, thereby safeguarding global food security.
2023	20 December 2023	Innovators with Outstanding Achievements in Emerging Field	Daniel J. Drucker	Canada	Identifying the function of glucagon-like peptide-1 (GLP-1), leading to the development of widely utilized treatments for diabetes and obesity, and fostering new applications for addressing neurodegenerative diseases.
2023	20 December 2023	Innovators with Outstanding Achievements in Emerging Field	Joel Habener	United States	Identifying the function of glucagon-like peptide-1 (GLP-1), leading to the development of widely utilized treatments for diabetes and obesity, and fostering new applications for addressing neurodegenerative diseases.
2023	20 December 2023	Innovators with Outstanding Achievements in Emerging Field	Svetlana Mojsov	United States	Identifying the function of glucagon-like peptide-1 (GLP-1), leading to the development of widely utilized treatments for diabetes and obesity, and fostering new applications for addressing neurodegenerative diseases.
2023	20 December 2023	Innovators with Outstanding Achievements in Emerging Field	Jens Juul Holst	Denmark	Identifying the function of glucagon-like peptide-1 (GLP-1), leading to the development of widely utilized treatments for diabetes and obesity, and fostering new applications for addressing neurodegenerative diseases.
2024	6 December 2024	Grand Prize	Yoshua Bengio	Canada	Transformational contributions to the advancement of deep learning.
2024	6 December 2024	Grand Prize	Geoffrey Hinton	Canada	Transformational contributions to the advancement of deep learning.
2024	6 December 2024	Grand Prize	Jensen Huang	United States	Transformational contributions to the advancement of deep learning.
2024	6 December 2024	Grand Prize	Yann LeCun	United States	Transformational contributions to the advancement of deep learning.
2024	6 December 2024	Grand Prize	Fei-Fei Li	United States	Transformational contributions to the advancement of deep learning.
2024	6 December 2024	Woman Innovator	Kristi Anseth	United States	Advancement in design of polymeric biomaterials and methods for biomedical applications.
2024	6 December 2024	Innovators from Developing Countries	Firdausi Qadri	Bangladesh	Innovative improvement of oral cholera vaccination in developing countries.
2024	6 December 2024	Innovators with Outstanding Achievements in Emerging Field	Zelig Eshhar	Israel	Development of CAR T cell therapy for cancer and other diseases.
2024	6 December 2024	Innovators with Outstanding Achievements in Emerging Field	Carl H. June	United States	Development of CAR T cell therapy for cancer and other diseases.
2024	6 December 2024	Innovators with Outstanding Achievements in Emerging Field	Michel Sadelain	United States	Development of CAR T cell therapy for cancer and other diseases.
2025	5 December 2025	Grand Prize	Douglas R. Lowy	United States	Discoveries and development of HPV vaccines for prevention of tumors caused by human papillomaviruses.
2025	5 December 2025	Grand Prize	John T. Schiller	United States	Discoveries and development of HPV vaccines for prevention of tumors caused by human papillomaviruses.
2025	5 December 2025	Grand Prize	Aimée R. Kreimer	United States	Discoveries and development of HPV vaccines for prevention of tumors caused by human papillomaviruses.
2025	5 December 2025	Grand Prize	Maura L. Gillison	United States	Discoveries and development of HPV vaccines for prevention of tumors caused by human papillomaviruses.
2025	5 December 2025	Woman Innovator	Mary-Claire King	United States	Identification of the breast and ovarian cancer susceptibility gene BRCA1, laying the foundation for genetic testing, screening programmes, and personalised treatment.
2025	5 December 2025	Innovators from Developing Countries	Esperanza Martínez-Romero	Mexico	Advances in microbial ecology and symbiotic nitrogen fixation in the tropics.
2025	5 December 2025	Innovators with Outstanding Achievements in Emerging Field	Venkatesan Sundaresan	United States	Innovations in the development of clonal hybrid crops.
2025	5 December 2025	Innovators with Outstanding Achievements in Emerging Field	Imtiyaz Khanday	United States	Innovations in the development of clonal hybrid crops.
2025	5 December 2025	Innovators with Outstanding Achievements in Emerging Field	Raphaël Mercier	Germany	Innovations in the development of clonal hybrid crops.
2025	5 December 2025	Innovators with Outstanding Achievements in Emerging Field	Emmanuel Guiderdoni	France	Innovations in the development of clonal hybrid crops.
2025	5 December 2025	Innovators with Outstanding Achievements in Emerging Field	Delphine Mieulet	France	Innovations in the development of clonal hybrid crops.

== Reception ==
The nominations have received praise from Sir Richard Henry Friend, the Cavendish Professor of Physics at the University of Cambridge.

Nobel Laureate Sir Konstantin Novoselov has commented on VinFuture Prize's "promotion of diversity and inclusion in the global scientific community".

== See also ==
- Japan Prize
- Tang Prize
- Breakthrough Prize
- Turing Award
