= Thalappil Pradeep =

Indian scientist

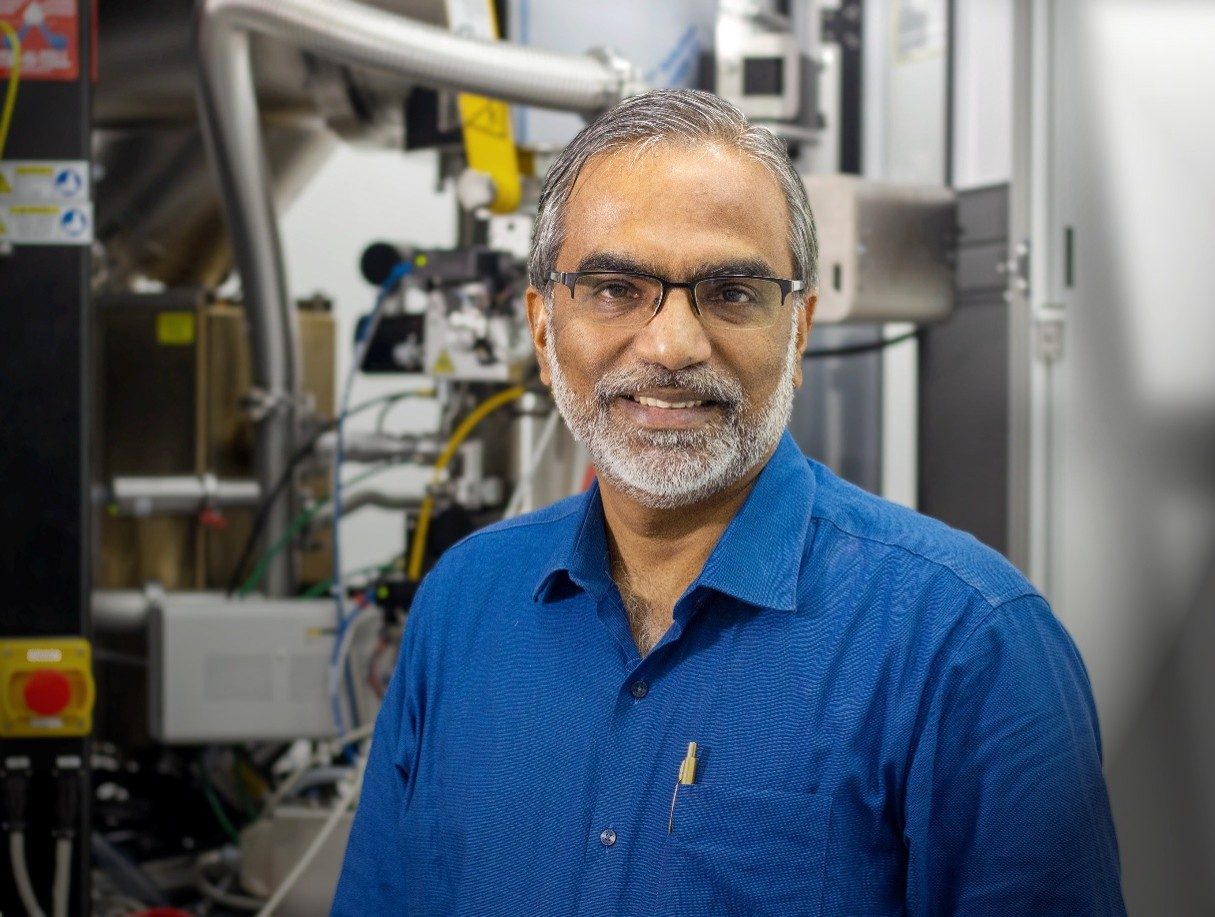
- Prof. T. Pradeep in his laboratory at IIT Madras (2026)
- Born: 8 July 1963 (age 63); Panthavoor, Kerala, India
- Education: Calicut University, IISc, UC Berkeley, Purdue University
- Awards: Rashtriya Vigyan Puraskar (2025), ENI award (2023), VinFuture Prize (2022), Prince Sultan bin Abdulaziz International Prize for Water (2022), Padma Shri (2020), Nikkei Asia Prize (2020), TWAS Prize (2018), Shanti Swarup Bhatnagar Prize (2008)
- Scientific career
- Fields: Molecular materials and surfaces
- Workplaces: Indian Institute of Technology Madras
- Website: pradeepresearch.org

Thalappil Pradeep is an Indian chemist and Institute Professor at the Indian Institute of Technology Madras (IIT Madras), where he holds the Deepak Parekh Institute Chair Professorship. His research focuses on molecular materials and surfaces, including nanomaterials, atomically precise metal nanoclusters, microdroplets and ice.

Pradeep is known for developing scalable and sustainable materials-based solutions for drinking-water purification that have enabled access to safe water in regions affected by heavy metals and pesticides. He has received the ENI award (Advanced Environmental Solutions, 2023), the VinFuture Prize (Special Prize for Innovators from Developing Countries, 2022), and the Prince Sultan bin Abdulaziz International Prize for Water (Creativity Prize, 2022). In 2020 he received the Nikkei Asia Prize (Science and Technology) and the Padma Shri, one of India’s highest civilian honours. He was awarded the Rashtriya Vigyan Puraskar (Vigyan Shri) in 2025.

== Early life and education ==
Pradeep was born on 8 July 1963, at Panthavoor, Kerala, India, to the late T. Narayanan Nair of the Thalappil house and P. P. Kunjilakshmi Amma of the Pulakkat Panampattavalappil house. Both his parents were school teachers. His father was a writer too, with the pen name N. N. Thalappil, who authored 14 books in Malayalam.

Pradeep was educated in government schools all through. From 5th to 10th, he was educated at the Govt. High School, Mookkuthala where his father taught Malayalam and mother taught social studies. The school was built by Padma Shri Pakaravoor Chitran Namboothiripad, who donated it to the Government at a token price of ₹ 1. Most of the days he walked the 4 km trip to the school, as most of his classmates. Later, he was educated at the MES College, Ponnani for his Pre Degree, St. Thomas College, Thrissur for his BSc and Farook College, Kozhikode for his M.Sc., all under Calicut University. He completed his BSc between 1980 and 1983 and his M.Sc. between 1983 and 1985. Between his M.Sc. and doctoral studies he briefly worked as a technical officer at the Centre for Water Resources Development and Management (1986).

== Academic career ==
Pradeep earned a PhD degree in chemical physics working with Professors C. N. R. Rao and M. S. Hegde at the Indian Institute of Science, Bangalore during 1986–91. He subsequently held a research associate position (1991) and a scientific officer position (1991–1992) at IISc Bangalore. After completing his doctoral studies, he held research positions at the University of California, Berkeley and Purdue University, Indiana, (postdoctoral fellowships, 1992–93 and 1993 respectively), and joined the faculty of the Indian Institute of Technology Madras, in 1993. He joined initially as a Visiting Faculty (December 1993), became an Assistant Professor (1995), an Associate Professor (2000), and a Professor (2004). He became an Institute Professor in 2015, the highest academic distinction at IIT Madras. He was subsequently named Institute Chair Professor (2016) and Deepak Parekh Institute Chair Professor (2017), and has held a J. C. Bose National Fellowship since 2015.

At IIT Madras, he has built a research program around nanomaterials, molecular surfaces, and environmental technologies. He has also been associated with initiatives aimed at translating advanced materials research for societal applications, particularly in the area of safe drinking water.

He held visiting positions at Purdue University, Leiden University, Netherlands, EPFL, Switzerland, Institute of Chemistry, Taiwan, Pohang University of Science and Technology, South Korea and University of Hyogo, Japan. He was also a visiting scientist at the Institute for Molecular Science, Okazaki, Japan (2006); a Fulbright Scholar at Purdue University (1998); Distinguished Visiting Professor at the PSG Institute of Advanced Studies, Coimbatore (since 2013); and Visiting Professor at Manipal University (since 2018). He is a Royal Society Wolfson Visiting Fellow at The University of Manchester currently. He also holds a Hovde Distinguished Visting Professor position at Purdue University.

== Research ==
His work is focused on clean water, atomically precise clusters, ice and microdroplets and associated technology implementation.

Nanomaterials for clean water: Pradeep's work on nanomaterials has focused on removing contaminants - such as pesticides, arsenic, and uranium - from drinking water. He translated these research findings into products and deployed them in the field to provide safe drinking water at a population scale.

A critical problem in achieving this goal is the development of advanced and affordable materials with no or reduced environmental impact. Some of the materials and technologies he has developed over the years have been combined to make affordable all-inclusive point-of-use drinking water purifiers, which are being installed in various parts of the country, both as a community plants and as domestic units. These advanced sand-like composites are made in the water at room temperature, with no environmental cost. Gravity-fed water solutions using such materials without the use of electricity can make sustainable access to safe drinking water a reality.

Atomically precise clusters: His work has contributed to the synthesis, characterisation, and property evaluation of several atomically precise metal nanoclusters. These materials are model systems for understanding size-dependent properties at the nanoscale and have applications in catalysis, sensing, and photonics. An outcome of his work is the introduction of inter-cluster reactions between clusters, which demonstrated that nanoparticles behave like simple molecules and stoichiometric reactions of the type, A + B → C + D, can be written for these processes, where A, B, C and D are nanoparticles. To describe the structure and properties of such clusters, his group has introduced a system of nomenclature for such systems in general.

His group developed ultrasensitive detection platforms based on nanomaterials and clusters, enabling trace-level detection of chemical species relevant to environmental monitoring and security. He has demonstrated supramolecular functionalisation of clusters. Such clusters help assemble 1D nanostructures, leading to precise 3D structures.

Surface and ice chemistry: Pradeep has conducted studies on molecular interactions at surfaces, including low-energy ion–surface collisions and processes occurring on ice and thin films. To discover and understand such processes, especially at the very top of ice, he built the very first ultra-low energy (1-10 eV) ion scattering spectrometer, a new tool in extremely surface sensitive spectroscopy, working at cryogenic temperatures and ultra-high vacuum, as in space. These investigations have provided insights into surface reactivity and molecular dynamics under controlled conditions. For example, his group discovered that clathrate hydrates can be formed even in space-like conditions.

Microdroplets chemistry: He has pioneered the synthesis of nanomaterials using microdroplets. In the early part of this work, conducted with Robert Graham Cooks of Purdue University, he had shown the formation of metal nanoparticles using droplets and their capacity to form nanoscale patterns on surfaces. The precursor metal ions came from the electrolytic dissolution of the metal electrodes used in the electrospray. While the contemporaneous work on microdroplets concentrated on the acceleration of reactions between dissolved molecules, this line of work applied ambient droplet sprays for the formation of solid state materials.

By controlling the experimental conditions, chains of nanoparticles resembling nanowires could be produced. This was the first attempt to make nanomaterials from metal salts using microdroplets. The use of ionic precursors made the process scalable and these assembled structures could be formed over areas of square centimeters and they resemble lawn grass at the nanoscale, having sharp, nanoscale tips. When cooled below the dew point, such surfaces condense atmospheric humidity, allowing water harvesting from air. A company was incubated at IIT Madras using this and related technologies.

He has also shown that charged water microdroplets act as microreactors, breaking even hard minerals such as quartz and ruby to form nanoparticles. This later work, reporting that quartz, ruby and other hard minerals fragment into 5–10 nanometre particles within milliseconds inside charged water microdroplets, was published in Science in May 2024; the computational component of the work was carried out with collaborators at the Jawaharlal Nehru Centre for Advanced Scientific Research (JNCASR). The action of microdroplets as ambient mills that grind materials to form nanoparticles led him to propose the term microdroplet mechanochemistry, describing the simultaneous action of chemical, mechanical and electrical forces on materials confined within droplets. Synthesis of materials at tens of gram scale is reported. The use of microdroplets as ambient reactors to break and make materials has since been extended to other systems. The emergence of the area has been reviewed by Cooks and Pradeep.

While the bottom-up method of making metallic nanostructures by charged water microdroplets had been reported earlier by the group, later studies also showed the top-down reconstruction. The microdroplet platform was later applied to bimetallic nanomaterials, such as platinum–copper nanorods, synthesized from homogeneous precursor solutions, emphasizing the versatility of the approach for materials synthesis.

Drinking-water purification technologies - technology translation and societal impact: Pradeep’s research led to the development of nanomaterial-based water purification systems designed to remove contaminants such as arsenic and pesticides from groundwater. He emphasized translating laboratory discoveries into deployable technologies. These technologies were developed with an emphasis on affordability, scalability, and ease of deployment in resource-limited settings. Community-scale purification units based on these materials have been deployed in affected regions, contributing to improved access to safe drinking water. About 1.5 million of these filters have been sold in the market by 2016. IIT Madras received over Rs. 230 lakhs in royalties from this finding, the first of its kind in the Indian university system, in terms of royalty earnings and reach from a single patent. His work has supported the development of water purification solutions implemented through partnerships with governmental agencies, non-profit organizations, and industry. These efforts aim to address water quality challenges in rural and underserved communities by providing reliable and low-maintenance purification systems.To support the development of water technologies by anyone interested in the area and implemented across the world, he has founded the International Centre for Clean Water.

== Awards and honours (as listed in the article) ==
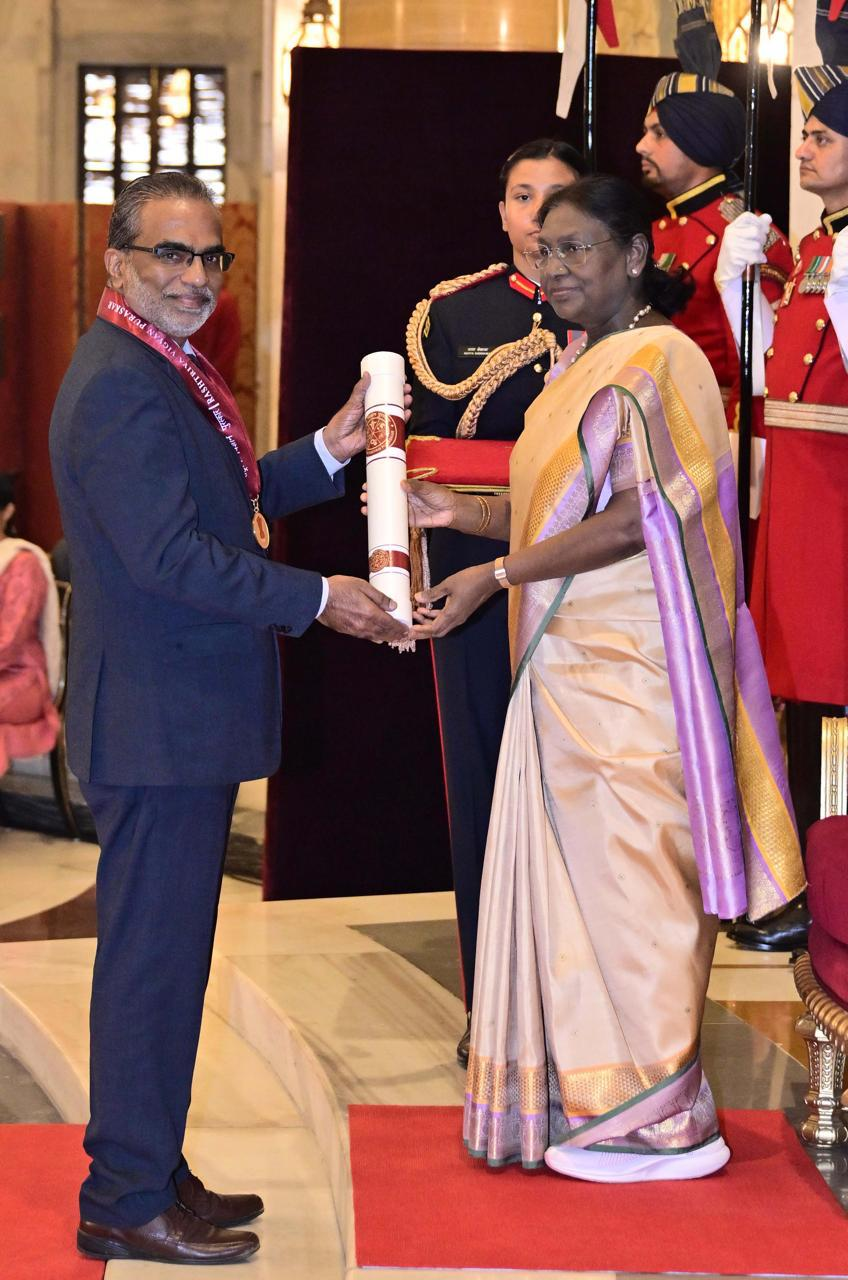
Prof. Thalappil Pradeep receiving the Rashtriya Vigyan Puraskar (Vigyan Shri) from President Droupadi Murmu at the Rashtrapati Bhavan (2025)

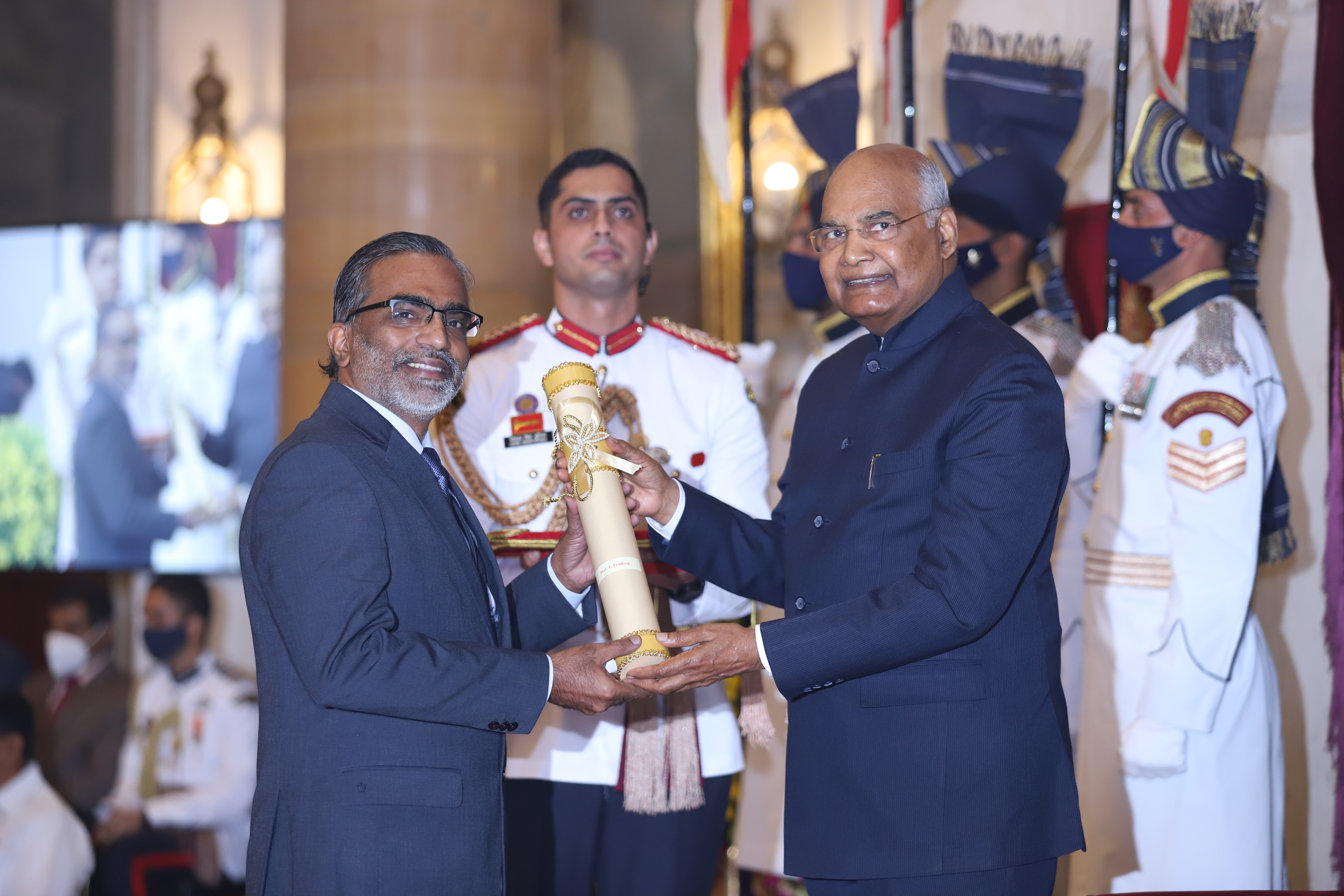
Prof. Thalappil Pradeep receiving the Padma Shri award from President Ram Nath Kovind at the Rashtrapati Bhavan (award of 2020, presented in 2021)

- 2025 - Rashtriya Vigyan Puraskar (Vigyan Shri, Chemistry)
- 2025 - Vigyan Ratna of Panjab University
- 2024 - International Member, US National Academy of Engineering (NAE)
- 2024 - Elected Member, Academia Europaea
- 2023 - Eni Award
- 2023 - International Medal for Materials Science and Technology, Materials Research Society of India
- 2023 - Sastra-CNR Rao Prize in Materials Chemistry
- 2023 - Prof. M. V. Pylee Award for the Distinguished Academician in India, awarded in 2024
- 2023 - Eminent Engineer Award of Engineering Council of India (ECI), awarded in 2024
- 2023 - Acharya Prafulla Chandra Ray Memorial Award of the Indian Chemical Society 2023, awarded in 2025
- 2023 - Goyal Prize of the Kurukshetra University, awarded in 2026
- 2022 - VinFuture Prize (Special Prize for Innovators from Developing Countries)
- 2022 - Prince Sultan Bin Abdulaziz International Prize for Water
- 2021 – Vishwakarma Medal, Indian National Science Academy
- 2021 – Distinguished Alumnus Award, Indian Institute of Science
- 2020 - Padma Shri
- 2020 - Nikkei Asia Prize
- 2020 - National Water Award
- 2020 - Silver medal, Chemical Research Society of India
- 2019 and 2021 - Asian Scientist 100, Asian Scientist
- 2018 - The World Academy of Sciences (TWAS) Prize in Chemistry
- 2015 - J. C. Bose National Fellowship
- 2015 – Lifetime Achievement Research Award, IIT Madras
- 2011 – Kerala Sahitya Akademi Award for Knowledge Literature (for a Malayalam popular-science book on nanotechnology)
- 2008 - Shanti Swarup Bhatnagar Prize for Science and Technology
- 2008 – National Research Award in Nano Science and Technology, Department of Science and Technology
- 2003 - B. M. Birla Science Prize and Young Scientist Award of the Chemical Research Society of India

== Companies Incubated ==
Seven companies have been incubated.

- InnoNano Research Pvt. Ltd. (a start-up company at IIT Madras). Not operational currently.
- Innodi Water Technologies Pvt. Ltd. (incubated at IIT Madras Incubation Cell). InnoDI (inno-dee-eye) develops and builds Capacitive De-ionization (CDI) based water treatment systems for the Indian and international market and has established manufacturing facilities.
- VayuJal Technologies Pvt. Ltd. (incubated at IIT Madras Incubation Cell). Vayujal develops power-efficient atmospheric water generators.
- AquEasy Innovations Pvt. Ltd. (incubated at IIT Madras Incubation Cell). AquEasy makes affordable, point-of-use drinking water purification technologies.
- Hydromaterials Pvt. Ltd. (incubated at IIT Madras Incubation Cell). Hydromaterials uses new materials for clean water.
- EyeNetAqa Pvt. Ltd. (incubated at ICCW). EyeNetAqa develops sensors for clean water.
- DeepSpectrum Analytics Pvt. Ltd. (incubated at ICCW). DeepSpectrum develops data-based solutions for clean water.

Several patents have been licensed to other companies.

== Centres built ==
He has conceptualised and built state-of-the-art centres for advanced research and technology development. Thematic Unit of Excellence was built for developing new technologies in the water sector. To build such technologies with the participation of the global community, by anyone interested in the area, he founded the International Centre for Clean Water (ICCW) at the IIT Madras Research Park. He has established the ANRF National Facility for Cryo-Electron Microscopy.

== Books ==
1. Thalappil Pradeep (Ed.), Advances in Physical Chemistry, Allied Publishers, New Delhi, 1999.

2. Thalappil Pradeep, Nano: The Essentials - Understanding Nanoscience and Nanotechnology, Tata McGraw-Hill, New Delhi, 2007, currently 14 th reprint is on sale. (Low cost Indian edition) The book is a textbook in over 60 universities for advanced undergraduate and graduate programmes.

3. S. K. Das, S. U. S. Choi, W. Yu, T. Pradeep, Nanofluids Science and Technology, John Wiley, New York (2008). This is the first monograph introducing the topic.

4. Thalappil Pradeep, Nano: The Essentials Understanding Nanoscience and Nanotechnology, McGraw-Hill, April 2008. (International edition)

5. Thalappil Pradeep, Nano: The Essentials Understanding Nanoscience and Nanotechnology, in Japanese, Kyorisu Press, August 2011. (Japanese edition)

6. Thalappil Pradeep and others, A Textbook on Nanoscience and Nanotechnology, McGraw-Hill Education, New Delhi 2012. This book is now a textbook in several universities for advanced nanoscience and nanotechnology courses.

7. David E. Reisner and Thalappil Pradeep (Eds.), Aquananotechnology: Global Prospects, CRC Press, New York, 2015.

8. Thalappil Pradeep (Ed.), Atomically precise metal nanoclusters, Elsevier, Amsterdam, 2023.

9. Thalappil Pradeep and Krishnan Narayanan, Empowering India, Ideas for Action by Scientists and Engineers, Indian Academy of Sciences, Bangalore, 2023.

10. Ligy Philip, Thalappil Pradeep, B. S. Murty (Eds.) Technological Solutions for Water Sustainability: Challenges & Prospects - towards a water-secure India, IWA Publishing, London, 2023.

According to Google Scholar, as of July 2026, his publications had received over 46,000 citations with an h-index of 98; Scopus recorded over 35,000 citations with an h-index of 84.

=== Popular science and other writing ===
- 'Vipathinte Kalochakal', T. Pradeep, National Book Stall, Kottayam, 1990.
- 'Aanava Prathisandhi' T. Pradeep and K. Vijayamohanan, DC Books, Kottayam, 1991.
- Chapter in, "Anusakthi Aapathu", Ed. RVG Menon, Sugathakumari, 1991.
- "Kunjukanangalku Vasantham Nanotechnologikku Oramukham", DC Books, Kottayam, 2007. This is based on a series of articles in Mathrubhumi Illustrated Weekly published during 2006–2007. (Won the Kerala Sahitya Academi Award of 2011)
- Chapter in, Rasathanthram: Jeevithavum Bhavium (translated as Chemistry: Life and Future), Kerala Sastra Sahitya Parishad, Trissur, 2011.

There are several popular science articles in English and Malayalam.

== Fellowships and recognitions ==
Pradeep is a Fellow of the Indian National Science Academy, Indian Academy of Sciences, Indian National Academy of Engineering, The National Academy of Sciences, The Royal Society of Chemistry, The American Association for the Advancement of Science, The World Academy of Sciences, The African Academy of Sciences, Academia Europaea, and the US National Academy of Engineering. He has received the Lifetime Achievement Research Award from the Indian Institute of Technology, Madras. He has received the Distinguished Alumnus Award from the Indian Institute of Science.

== Editorial and professional service ==
Pradeep serves or has served on the editorial boards of journals including Nanoscale, Nanoscale Horizons, Chemistry of Materials, ACS Nano, ACS Environmental Science & Technology, Analytical Chemistry, Chemical Communications, ACS Applied Materials and Interfaces, and npj Clean Water, and has been an associate editor of ACS Sustainable Chemistry & Engineering and ACS Sustainable Resource Management. He has served on government and institutional advisory bodies in India, including committees of the Department of Science and Technology, the Scientific Advisory Council to the Prime Minister, and the Ministry of Jal Shakti's Department of Drinking Water and Sanitation, and has chaired the Board of Governors of the Institute of Nano Science and Technology, Mohali (2021–2024). He has been the Convener of Higher Education Reforms Commission of the Government of Kerala during 2020-2022. He has been the Vice President of the Indian Society for Mass Spectrometry since 2014.
