= Samuel J. Heyman Service to America Medals =

American awards

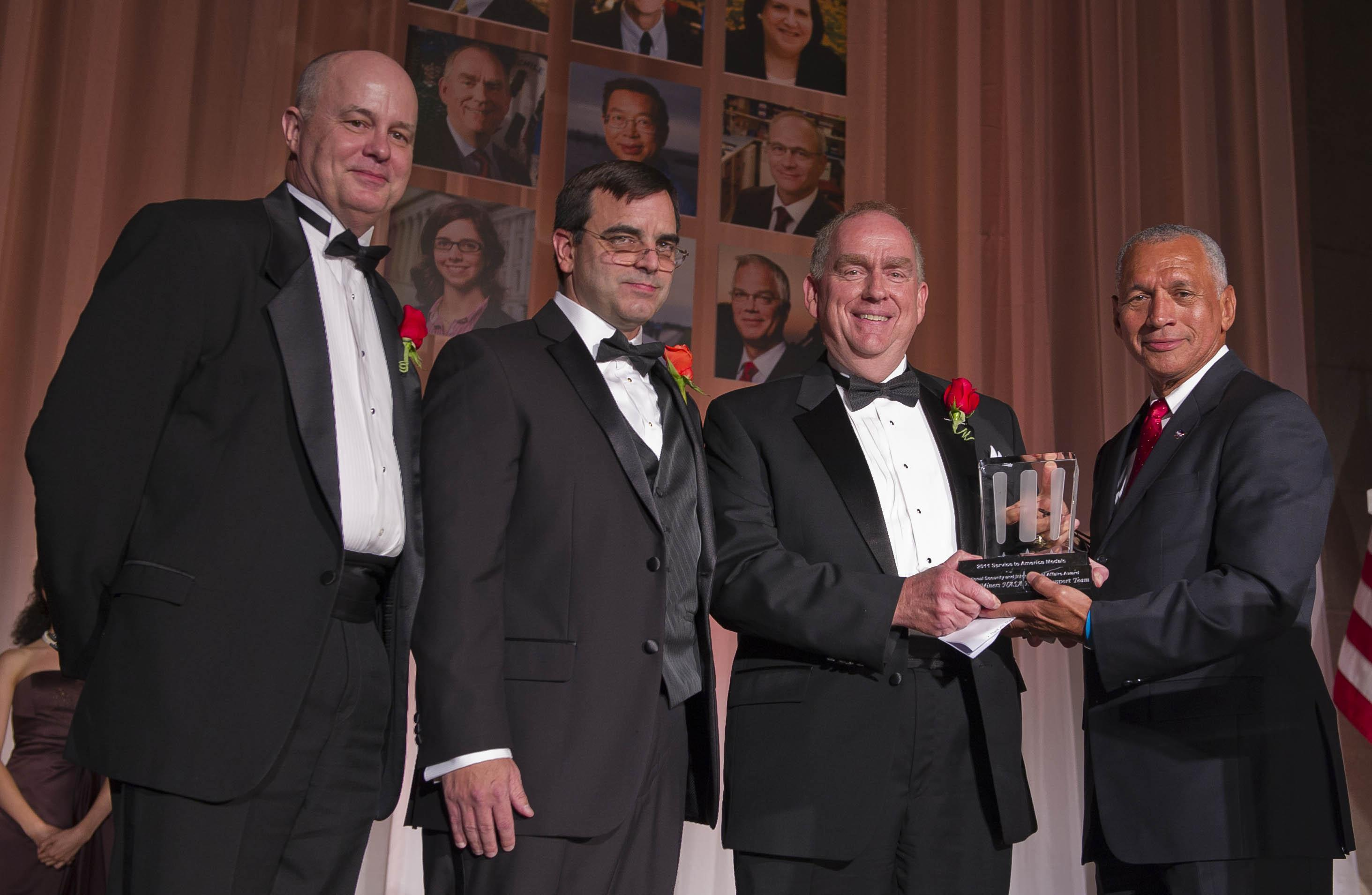
- NASA administrator Charles Bolden, right, presents the National Security and International Affairs Medal to Michael Duncan, former deputy chief medical officer at NASA's Johnson Space Center in Houston at the 2011 Sammies gala in Washington.
- Awarded for: Making a significant contribution to the country.
- Country: United States
- Presented by: Partnership for Public Service
- First award: 5 October 2002 (24 years ago)
- Website: servicetoamericamedals.org

The Samuel J. Heyman Service to America Medals, also known as "the Sammies", honor members of the federal government workforce, highlighting the work of employees making significant contributions to the governance of the United States. The awards are considered "the Oscars" of American government service. The Sammies accordingly celebrate excellence in the federal merit service.

== Background ==
The awards have been presented annually since 2002 by the nonprofit, nonpartisan Partnership for Public Service to celebrate excellence in the U.S. federal civil service, and are named for Samuel J. Heyman, the organization's founder.

== Selection process ==
The Sammies are chosen from nominations collected each winter, and narrowed down to about 30 finalists announced mid-spring of each year during Public Service Recognition Week. The finalists are assessed, and from their ranks, eight awardees are selected by early fall. The Sammies selection committee is composed of nationally known journalists, political leaders, educators, and executives of large corporations. The eight awards cover the various sectors of federal public service. Honorees are chosen for their commitment and innovation, as well as the impact of their work on addressing the needs of the republic. Awardees are announced each fall at a dinner and awards ceremony in Washington, D.C. The Sammies finalists are those federal employees confronting complex issues of governance, including environmental, national security, and economic challenges. One criterion of the award is to qualify from among a dynamic group of talented, bright individuals working on behalf of the American people. The awards are organized and presented by the non-profit organization Partnership for Public Service (PPS).

== Award changes ==
Beginning in 2025, nominees were no longer named for specific categories. In 2026, the number of nominee submissions from individual agencies was greatly reduced, and some agencies did not participate at all. Additionally, according to Max Stier, the chief executive of the PPS, a number of nominees who were named requested that their names not be considered or not made public, due to fear of retribution or retaliation for having too much attention drawn to them.

== Recipients ==
=== 2000s ===
	Winners	Category
2002	William Fleming & Ben Herren Katharine Blodgett Gebbie Daniel Weinberg Rachel Billingslea Kenneth Conepcion Robert Rutherford Alfred League Donald Sweeney	Federal Employee of the Year Paul A. Volcker Career Achievement Citizen Services Emerging Leaders Science and Environment Safety, Security and International Affairs Safety, Security and International Affairs Safety, Security and International Affairs
2003	Stephen McHale James P. Bagain Nelson Hernandez (among others) Denise Johnson Alyson McFarland Earl Stockdale Riaz Awan Paul Polski Edward J. Needham (among others)	Federal Employee of the Year Paul A. Volcker Career Achievement Citizen Services Citizen Services Emerging Leaders Science and Environment Safety, Security and International Affairs Safety, Security and International Affairs Safety, Security and International Affairs
2004	Robert F. Clifford Prudence Bushnell Eileen Harrington (among others) Nicole Nelson-Jean Deborah S. Jin Stephen E. Browning Peter Darling (among others) Brad Gair	Federal Employee of the Year Paul A. Volcker Career Achievement Citizen Services Emerging Leaders Science and Environment Safety, Security and International Affairs Safety, Security and International Affairs Safety, Security and International Affairs
2005	Orlando Figueroa Barbara Turner Terence Lutes Kevin McAleenan Subhashree Madhavan (among others) Tobin Bradley Elizabeth Grossman Alan Estevez Steven Bice	Federal Employee of the Year Paul A. Volcker Career Achievement Citizen Services Emerging Leaders Science and Environment Safety, Security and International Affairs Safety, Security and International Affairs Safety, Security and International Affairs Safety, Security and International Affairs
2006	Nancy Cox William Daniel Phillips Thomas Casadevall (among others) Christina Sanford Norden E. Huang Mark S. Ward Nancy Jo Powell W. Martin Harrell Ron McNeal	Federal Employee of the Year Paul A. Volcker Career Achievement Citizen Services Emerging Leaders Science and Environment Safety, Security and International Affairs Safety, Security and International Affairs Safety, Security and International Affairs Safety, Security and International Affairs
2007	Douglas R. Lowly & John T. Schiller David Vesely Dinah F. B. Cohen Nicole Faison Frazer Lockhart (among others) Tracy Mustin John S. Morgan (among others) Anh Duong Edward Messmer	Federal Employee of the Year Paul A. Volcker Career Achievement Citizen Services Emerging Leaders Science and Environment Safety, Security and International Affairs Safety, Security and International Affairs Safety, Security and International Affairs Safety, Security and International Affairs
2008	Richard Greene Stephen O. Andersen Rajiv Jain Alain D. Carballeyra Steven G. Chalk Mary Katherine Friedrich Mark Pletcher Eddie Bernard	Federal Employee of the Year Paul A. Volcker Career Achievement Citizen Services Emerging Leaders Science and Environment Safety, Security and International Affairs Safety, Security and International Affairs Safety, Security and International Affairs
2009	Janet Kemp Thomas Alexander Waldmann Michael German Clare D. Rowley Patricia Guerry T. Allan Comp Amy Meyer Donald Burke & Sean P. Dennehy Walter Benjamin Fisherow	Federal Employee of the Year Paul A. Volcker Career Achievement Citizen Services Emerging Leaders Science and Environment Science and Environment Safety, Security and International Affairs Safety, Security and International Affairs Safety, Security and International Affairs

=== 2010s ===
==== 2010 ====
Winners	Category
Pius Bannis (USCIS)	Federal Employee of the Year
Susan Solomon (NOAA)	Paul A. Volcker Career Achievement
Shane Kelley & Eva Ristow (Social Security Administration)	Citizen Services
Saskia van Gendt (EPA)	Emerging Leaders
Jeffrey M. Baker (Department of Energy)	Science and Environment
Jamie L. Konstas (FBI)	Safety, Security and International Affairs
Teri Glass and team (U.S. Army)	Safety, Security and International Affairs
Sandra K. Brooks (U.S. Navy)	Safety, Security and International Affairs

==== 2011 ====
Winners	Category
Paul A. Hsieh (USGS)	Federal Employee of the Year
Alfonso Batres (VA)	Paul A. Volcker Career Achievement
Diane K. Braunstein (Social Security Administration)	Citizen Services
Ann S. Martin (Financial Crimes Enforcement Network)	Emerging Leaders
William A. Gahl (NIH)	Science, Technology, and Environment
Charles Heurich and team (U.S. Department of Justice)	Safety, Security and International Affairs
James Michael Duncan and team (NASA)	Safety, Security and International Affairs
C. Norman Coleman (NIH)	Safety, Security and International Affairs

==== 2012 ====
Winners	Category
Lynne Meryl Mofenson(NIH)	Federal Employee of the Year
James Cash (National Transportation Safety Board)	Paul A. Volcker Career Achievement
Elliot B. Branch (Department of the Navy)	Management Excellence
Susan Angell & Mark Johnston (among others) (Housing and Urban Development, VA)	Citizen Services
Jacob M. Taylor (National Institute of Standards and Technology)	Emerging Leaders
Neal S. Young (NIH)	Science and Environment
Louis Milione (among others) (Drug Enforcement Administration)	Safety, Security and International Affairs
Nael Samha & Thomas Roland Jr. (U.S. Customs and Border Protection)	Safety, Security and International Affairs
Charles Scoville (VA)	Safety, Security and International Affairs

==== 2013 ====
Winners	Category
Julie Segre & Tara Palmore (among others)(NIH)	Federal Employee of the Year
Orice Williams Brown (GAO)	Paul A. Volcker Career Achievement
Kevin T. Geiss (Department of the Air Force)	Management Excellence
Daniel Madrzykowski (National Institute of Standards and Technology)	Citizen Services
Andrew Rabens (Department of State)	Emerging Leaders
David Lavery (among others) (NASA)	Science and Environment
John MacKinnon (among others) (Homeland Security)	Safety, Security and International Affairs
Hamid Jafari (CDC)	Safety, Security and International Affairs
Antonio J. Mendez (CIA)	(General Winner)

==== 2014 ====
Winners	Category
Rana Hajjeh (among others) (CDC)	Federal Employee of the Year
Edwin Kneedler (Department of Justice)	Paul A. Volcker Career Achievement
Alan J. Lindenmoyer (NASA)	Management Excellence
Michael Byrne (FCC)	Citizen Services
Sara Meyers (Housing and Urban Development)	Emerging Leaders
William A. Bauman and Ann M. Spungen (VA)	Science and Environment
Omar Aybar & Reginald France (among others) (Department of Health and Human Services)	Safety, Security and International Affairs
Sean Young & Benjamin Tran (Department of the Air Force)	Safety, Security and International Affairs

==== 2015 ====
Winners	Category
Steven A. Rosenberg (NIH)	Federal Employee of the Year
Hyun Soon Lillehoj (Department of Agriculture)	Paul A. Volcker Career Achievement
Edward C. Hugler ([Department of Labor)	Management Excellence
Jean Zenklusen & Carolyn Hutter (among others) (NIH)	People's Choice Award
Lucile Jones (USGS)	Citizen Services
Adam R. Schildge (Department of Transportation)	Emerging Leaders
Jacob E. Moss (EPA)	Science and Environment
Mia Beers (among others) (USAID)	Safety, Security and International Affairs
Ron Ross (National Institute of Standards and Technology)	Safety, Security and International Affairs

==== 2016 ====
Winners	Category
Paul McGann, Jean D. Moody-Williams, Dennis Wagner (Medicare/Medicaid)	Federal Employee of the Year
Kathleen Hogan (Department of Energy)	Paul A. Volcker Career Achievement
William Gregory Burel (CDC)	Management Excellence
Edward Grace (among others) (USFWS)	People's Choice Award
Lisa M. Jones (Department of the Treasury)	Citizen Services
Tate Jarrow (Secret Service)	Emerging Leaders
Jaques Reifman (among others) (Department of the Army)	Science and Environment
Kirk Yeager (FBI)	Safety, Security and International Affairs
Thomas Mariani, S. O'Rourke, S. Himmelhoch (Department of Justice)	Safety, Security and International Affairs

==== 2017 ====
Winners	Category
Phillip Brooks, Byron Bunker, & Josh Van Eaton (USEPA, (Department of Justice)	Federal Employee of the Year
Tedd V. Ellerbrock (CDC)	Paul A. Volcker Career Achievement
Courtney Lias & Stayce Beck (among others) (FDA)	Management Excellence
Surabhi Shah (among others) (USEPA)	People's Choice Award
Flora M. Jordan (Marine Corps Systems Command)	Promising Innovations Medal
Rory A. Cooper (VA)	Science and Environment
Timothy P. Camus (among others) (Department of the Treasury)	Safety, Security and International Affairs
Alex Mahoney (among others) (USAID)	Safety, Security and International Affairs

==== 2018 ====
Winners	Category
Daniel L. Kastner (Department of Health and Human Services)	Federal Employee of the Year
Marshalyn Yeargin-Allsopp (CDC)	Paul A. Volcker Career Achievement
Marcella Jacobs (among others) (VA)	Management Excellence
Alison Smith (Department of Defense)	People's Choice Award
Jeff Bezos	Spirit of Service Award
Parimal Kopardekar (NASA)	Promising Innovations Medal
Margaret Honein (CDC)	Science and Environment
Karen Dodge & Margaret Moeser (among others) (FTC, Department of Justice)	Safety, Security and International Affairs
Andrew M. Herscowitz (among others) (USAID)	Safety, Security and International Affairs

==== 2019 ====
Winners	Category
Victoria Brahm (VA)	Federal Employee of the Year
Ann McKee (VA)	Paul A. Volcker Career Achievement
Robert Cabana (among others) (Kennedy Space Center)	Management Excellence
Michael R. Bloomberg	Spirit of Service Award
Daniel B. Jernigan (CDC)	Science and Environment
Jamie Rhome (National Weather Service)	Safety, Security and International Affairs
Ryan Shelby (USAID)	Safety, Security and International Affairs

=== 2020s ===
==== 2020 ====
Winners	Category
Anthony Fauci (NIAID)	Federal Employee of the Year
Ira Pastan (NIH)	Paul A. Volcker Career Achievement
Neil C. Evans, Kathleen L. Frisbee, Kevin Galpin (VA)	Management Excellence
Corvelli A. McDaniel & Lorraine Cole (Department of the Treasury)	People's Choice Award
Vikram Krishnasamy (CDC)	Emerging Leaders
Satya Nadella (Microsoft)	Spirit of Service Award
Beth Ripley (VA)	Science and Environment
Donna F. Dodson (NIST)	Safety, Security and International Affairs

==== 2021 ====
Winners	Category
Kizzmekia Corbett and Barney S. Graham (NIH)	Federal Employee of the Year
Ana Hinojosa, Eric Choy and team (U.S. Customs and Border Protection)	Safety, Security and International Affairs
Michelle Daniels, Charles Eldridge and Ryan Jones (Housing and Urban Development)	Management Excellence
Evan Kwerel (FCC)	Paul A. Volcker Career Achievement
Reem Ghandour (HRSA)	Science, Technology and Environment
Callie Higgins (NIST)	Emerging Leaders
Laurene Powell Jobs (Apple)	Spirit of Service

==== 2022 ====
Winners	Category
Gregory Robinson (NASA)	Federal Employee of the Year
Krista Kinnard (U.S. Department of Labor)	Emerging Leaders
Clifford Lane (NIAID)	Paul A. Volcker Career Achievement
Holly Herrera, Hilary Ingraham, Kiera Berdinner, and team (Department of State))	Safety, Security and International Affairs
Cynthia A. Newberg (EPA)	Science, Technology and Environment
Amanda Cohn, Anita Patel, David Fitter (CDC)	COVID-19 Response
Barbara C. Morton (VA)	Management Excellence
Darren Walker, (Ford Foundation)	Spirit of Service Award

==== 2023 ====
Winners	Category
Laura Cooper and team (Department of Defense)	Federal Employee of the Year
Melissa Emrey-Arras (GAO)	Paul A. Volcker Career Achievement
Joshua C. Mellor, Nicholas I. Cheviron, Stephanie Stevens (Department of Justice, FBI)	Safety, Security and International Affairs
Brian Key, Scott Bellamy (NASA)	Science, Technology and Environment
Paul Nissenbaum, Gloria M. Shepherd, Maria S. Lefevre (Department of Transportation)
Fletcher Schoen, Jennifer Harkins (Department of State)	Emerging Leaders
Sarah O’Donnell, Allison Hutchings, Megan Meacham (HRSA)	People's Choice Award
Judy Woodruff (PBS)	Spirit of Service Award

==== 2024 ====
Winners	Category
Shannon Rebolledo, Justin Uphold, Nancy Alcantara, and team (U.S. Department of Labor)	Federal Employee of the Year
Christopher Mark (U.S. Department of Labor)	Paul A. Volcker Career Achievement
Pete Guria, Steve Calanog, Tara Fitzgerald, and team (EPA)	Safety, Security and International Affairs
Jerry Ma (U.S. Patent and Trademark Office)	Emerging Leaders
Amira C. Boland (Office of Management and Budget)	Management Excellence
Marc Levitan, Long Phan, and team (NIST)	Science, Technology and Environment
Yan Ping (Judy) Chen, Jay D. Evans (Department of Agriculture)	People's Choice Award
Chris Evans, Mark Kassen, Joe Kiani (A Starting Point)	Spirit of Service Award

==== 2025 ====
Winners	Category
Dave Lebryk (Department of the Treasury)	Federal Employee of the Year
Yakov Pachepsky, Moon S. Kim (Department of Agriculture)	Honorees
Thuc Hoang (Department of Energy)	Honoree
Susan S. Xu (Department of Health and Human Services)	Honoree
Shane P. Harrigan (Department of Justice)	Honoree
Kristofer Pasquale, Heather McCormick, Alex Meusburger (Small Business Administration)	Honorees
Ruishu F. Wright (Department of Energy)	Honoree
Richard Burns (NASA)	Honoree
Renata Miskell, Linda Chero (Department of the Treasury)	Honorees
Pavan Pidugu (Department of Transportation)	Honoree
Luis Coronado Jr., Matt Pierce (Department of State)	Honorees
Michaelangelo León (Department of Defense)	Honoree
Christina Ritter, Lara Strawbridge, Daniel Heider (Department of Health and Human Services)	Honorees
Maya Bretzius (Department of the Treasury)	Honoree
Mary Anne Alvin (Department of Energy)	Honoree
Lydia Carpenter (Department of Agriculture)	Honoree
Laura W. Cheever (Department of Health and Human Services)	Honoree
Kyle Randall Knipper (Department of Agriculture)	Honoree
Kathleen Kirsch (USAID)	Honoree
Johnie N. Jenkins (Department of Agriculture)	Honoree
John A. Blevins (NASA)	Honoree
Chad Kahler, Michael Staudenmaier Jr., Mark Loeffelbein (National Weather Service)	Honorees
Alexander Maranghides (Department of Commerce)	Honoree

==== 2026 ====
Winners	Category
Gharun Lacy (Department of State)	Honoree
Jill A. Frisch (Department of the Treasury)	Honoree
Paul VanRaden, Ransom L. Baldwin VI, Curtis P. Van Tassell (Department of Agriculture)	Honorees
James Szykman (EPA)	Honoree
