= Venkatesan Sundaresan =

Indian-American plant biologist

- Born: 1952 (age 73–74); India
- Education: University of Poona (B.Sc. in Physics); Indian Institute of Technology (M.Sc. in Physics); Carnegie Mellon University (M.S. in Physics); Harvard University (Ph.D. in Biophysics)
- Awards: Wolf Prize
- Scientific career
- Fields: Plant biology, Plant reproduction
- Workplaces: University of California, Davis
- Doctoral advisor: Frederick M. Ausubel
- Website: sundarlab.weebly.com

Venkatesan Sundaresan (born 1952) is an Indian-American biologist and professor in the Departments of Plant Biology and Plant Sciences at the University of California, Davis. His research focuses on plant reproduction, including using synthetic apomixis to clone hybrid strains of commercial crops like rice and maize. Sundaresan was inducted into the National Academy of Sciences in 2023 and received the 2024 Wolf Prize in Agriculture "for key discoveries on plant developmental biology of relevance to crop improvement". In 2025, he received an award in VinFuture Prize along with others for the development of clonal hybrid crops.
