= Esperanza Martínez-Romero =

Mexican scientist

Esperanza Martínez Romero
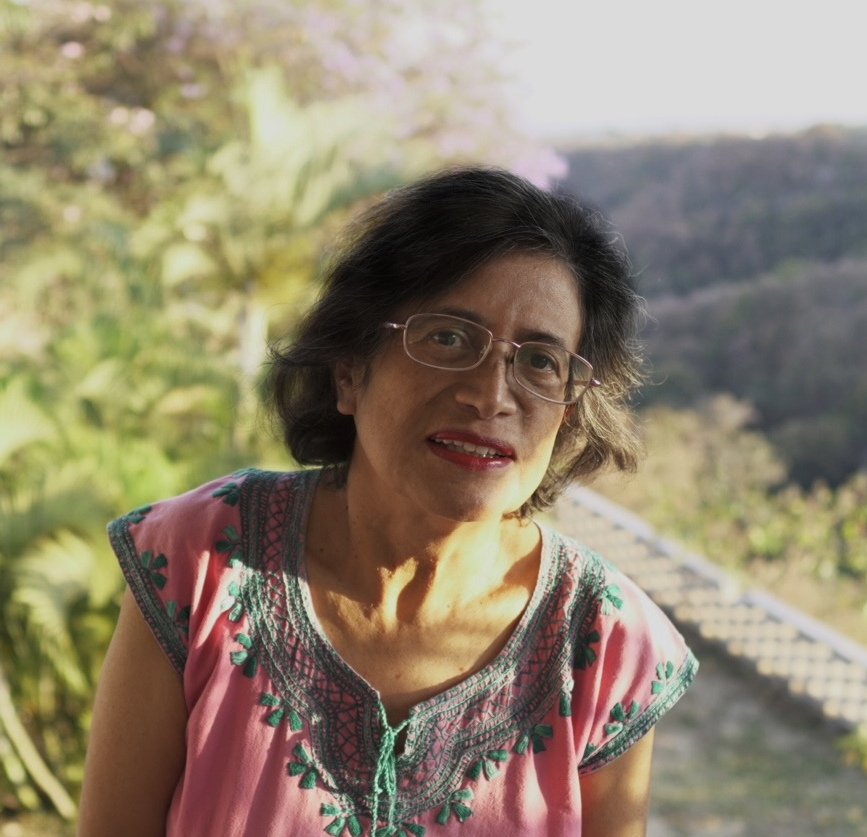
- Born: Esperanza Martínez Romero; 25 August 1957; México city
- Citizenship: Mexican
- Education: National Autonomous University of Mexico (B.S., M.S., & Ph.D.)
- Scientific career
- Fields: Microbiology
- Workplaces: National Autonomous University of Mexico

Esperanza Martínez-Romero is a researcher and head of the Genomic Ecology Program at the Center for Genomic Sciences (CCG) of the National Autonomous University of Mexico (UNAM) in Cuernavaca, Mexico. She was awarded the L'Oréal-UNESCO For Women in Science Award in 2020.

Martínez-Romero studies the mutualistic symbioses of bacteria with Mexico's plants and animals using metagenomics and functional genomics approaches. She was a pioneer in the molecular study of the nitrogen fixing symbiosis of beans and the endophytes of corn and beans. She described new plant and insect bacteria from Mexico. Some of them are species of nitrogen-fixing bacteria. The strains she obtained are deposited in official bacterial collections. Some of them are used as inoculants or biofertilizers in agriculture. She is a postgraduate professor at the Universidad Nacional Autónoma de México, where she also studied. She has received several awards, including the L'Oréal-UNESCO Awards for Women in Science in 2020. She has published 243 scientific works that together gather more than 9500 external citations (SCOPUS).

== Early life and education ==
Since her childhood, Martínez-Romero had access to her father's biology books. Her mother worked as a principal in an elementary school. Esperanza completed her bachelor's, master's and doctorate studies in biomedical research at UNAM.

== Career ==
Martínez-Romero studied Biomedical Research at the National Autonomous University of Mexico (UNAM) to obtain her bachelor's, master's, and Ph.D. degree. She did postdoctoral research at the National Institute for Agricultural Research of Toulouse, France. She has also completed research stays in Sweden, Germany, Brazil, and sabbaticals at the University of California, Davis.

She began her career researching nitrogen fixation, with the idea of applying this knowledge to agriculture. She is an expert in ecology and microbial diversity, she has described several species of Rhizobium, one of the bacterial genera known as nitrogen fixers and symbionts of plants. In 1991 Esperanza discovered the species Rizobium tropici a symbiont species of the bean now used extensively as an inoculant.

In 2005 she was president of an international committee on taxonomy and president of the Mexican Association of Microbiology, due to her interest in microbial ecology since 2016.

=== Contributions ===
Martínez-Romero carried out the first molecular characterizations of the rhizobia species that form nitrogen-fixing nodules in beans, which is the legume with the highest human consumption in the world. She believe that nitrogen fixation is key to the development of sustainable agriculture, and has explored bacteria from nitrogen-fixing corn trees and in 2022 from animals such as the Tamaulipas tortoise, endangered rabbits, and various insects native to Mexico. She is an enthusiast of microbiome studies, a new area of knowledge, and she seeks to promote it in Mexico by giving classes, conferences, and she has organized national and international congresses on the microbiome. All plants and animals live with microbes and this coexistence (symbiosis) is the general strategy of life, and Martínez investigates the mutualistic symbioses of bacteria with plants and animals native to Mexico with metagenomic and functional genomics approaches. She has described new species of plant and insect bacteria from Mexico, some of them nitrogen fixers, which open the possibility to explore nitrogen fixation in animals. Some of the bacteria she described are used as inoculants or biofertilizers in agriculture. A species of Rhizobium was proposed by colleagues in the field under its name, Rhizobium esperanzae. She has given a good number of interviews on radio and television programs.

=== Scientific production ===
She has published over 200 articles in international indexed journals, book chapters, and various popular articles. She has organized national events and international congresses, in 2020 she organized the National Congress of Microbiome and in 2021 the Latin American Congress of Microbiome online.

== Awards and recognition ==
Martínez-Romero received the research award in Natural Sciences from the Mexican Academy of Sciences (1997), the UNAM Juana Ramírez de Asbaje Recognition (2003), the National University Award for Research in Natural Sciences (2005) and the Agrobio Award (2011). .

In 2020, she received the international award from L'oreal UNESCO for her trajectory in improving crop yields by reducing the use of chemical fertilizers through the use of environmentally friendly bacteria.

- National University Award for Young Academics. November 8, 1996
- Prize in Natural Sciences of the Mexican Academy of Sciences. June 30, 1997
- Recognition by the ISI - General Directorate of Libraries (September 2000), to two highly cited Mexican articles
- Recognition-UNAM “Juana Ramírez de Asbaje, March 8, 2003
- National University Award in Natural Sciences, November 7, 2005
- Recognition as a Member of the American Academy of Microbiology, admission January 2009
- AgroBio 2011 Award, Mexico City, October 20, 2011
- Recognition of State Merit in Research Trajectory, REMEI Morelos Nov 2014
- General Emiliano Zapata Salazar Medal in the Research Publications category, August 8, 2017
- Most cited Mexican scientist, 2019
- National Science Award of Mexico, December 2019
- L'Oréal-UNESCO Awards for Women in Science, March 2020
- Innovators from Developing Countries Award of VinFuture Prize, December 2025
