= Thuc-Quyen Nguyen =

Biochemist

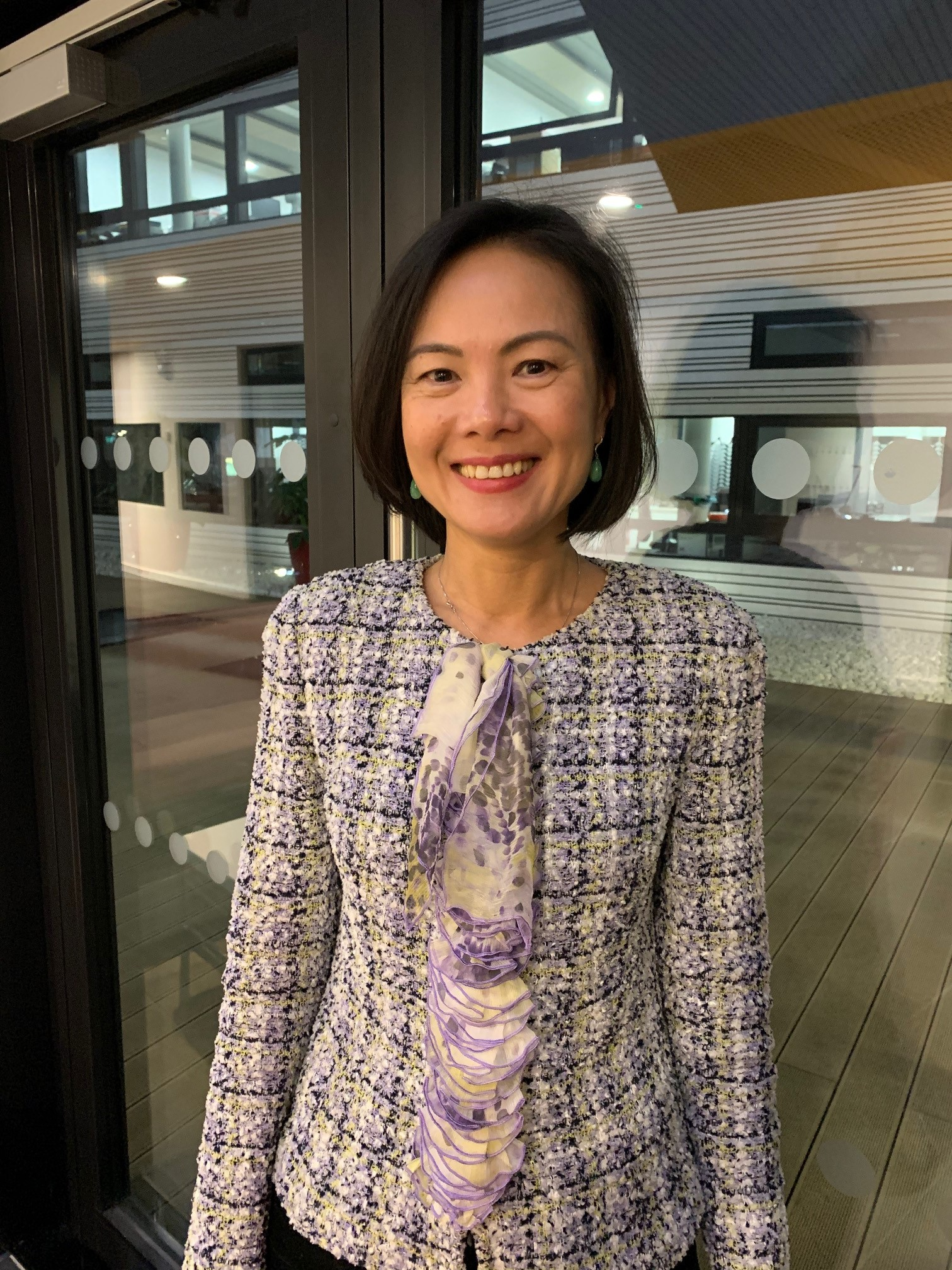
- Professor Nguyen during a visit to the Maxwell Centre at the University of Cambridge
- Born: Nguyễn Thục Quyên; 1970 (age 55–56); Buôn Ma Thuột (city), Republic of Vietnam
- Citizenship: US
- Education: UCSB; UCLA; WashU; USC
- Awards: #Awards
- Scientific career
- Fields: Biochemistry, Organic chemistry, Physical chemistry
- Workplaces: UCSB, VinFuture Prize

Thuc-Quyen Nguyen is Director and Professor at the Center for Polymers and Organic Solids (CPOS), and a professor of the Chemistry & Biochemistry department at the University of California Santa Barbara. Her research focuses on organic electronic devices, using optical, electrical, and structural techniques to understand materials and devices such as photovoltaics, LEDs, photodiodes, and field-effect transistors.

== Early life and education ==
Professor Nguyen was born in Buôn Ma Thuột Vietnam. She was curious from an early age, always trying to understand how things work. Her mother was a math teacher so she was inspired from an early age to become a teacher. There are four generations of teachers in her family, and as a young child, she went along to her mother's classes as there was no daycare to attend. These experiences sparked interest in being an effective teacher.

In 1991, when she was 21, she moved with her family to the United States, arriving with very little knowledge of English. To try to improve her language skills and progress through school, she attended three schools at once, going to morning, afternoon, and evening classes. Her first term at Santa Monica College, she took four ESL courses at the same time, and after a year, was able to begin normal coursework.

After graduating from Santa Monica College in 1995 with an A.S., she began working toward a bachelor's degree at UCLA, while also work in the library in evenings to help pay for University. She also began working in a plant physiology lab, beginning by washing glassware. She asked for a research internship in the same lab during the summer but the lab manager turned her down. She also asked several labs at UCLA but they also turned her down. One professor said "research is not for everyone" and she should focus on learning English.

== Research and career ==
Professor Nguyen completed her masters in 1998, and PhD in 2001, both from UCLA. In her PhD, she processed and studied conducting polymers using ultrafast spectroscopy under the supervision of Professor Benjamin Schwartz.

After her PhD, Professor Nguyen worked as a research associate at Columbia University, with Professor Louis Brus. She also worked for some time after her PhD at the IBM Thomas J Watson Research Center. In 2004, Nguyen joined UCSB Chemistry and Biochemistry department as an assistant professor, and received appointment to full professor in 2011. She collaborated with Guillermo Bazan and Alan Heeger at UCSB for many years [4].

Professor Nguyen's current research focuses on organic electronic devices. She studies how chemical structure influence performance and function of organic devices like PVs, OLEDs, OFETs, and OPDs. She is interested in improving organic solar cells as well as developing flexible electronics.

== Awards ==
- 2005 – Office of Naval Research Young Investigator Award.
- 2006 – NSF CAREER award.
- 2007 – Harold Plous Award.
- 2008 – Camille Dreyfus Teacher-Scholar Award.
- 2009 – Alfred P. Sloan Research Fellow.
- 2010 – Alexander von Humboldt Senior Research Award.
- 2010 – American Competitiveness and Innovation Fellowship (ACI).
- 2015 – Alexander von Humboldt Research Award for Senior Scientists
- 2015-2019 – World's most Influential Scientific Minds
- 2016 – Fellow of the Royal Society of Chemistry
- 2019 – Fellow of the American Association for the Advancement of Science (AAAS)
- 2019 – Beaufort Visiting Scholar, St John’s College, Cambridge University
- 2019 – Hall of Fame, Advanced Materials
- 2020 – UCSB Outstanding Graduate Student Mentor Award
- 2023 – Wilhelm Exner Medal
- 2023 – Elected to the US National Academy of Engineering
- 2023 – De Gennes Prize for Materials Chemistry (Royal Society of Chemistry)
- 2023 – Fellow of the US National Academy of Inventors

== See also ==
- VinFuture
