= Undiagnosed Diseases Network =

The Undiagnosed Diseases Network (UDN) is a research study that is funded by the National Institutes of Health Common Fund. Its purpose is to bring together clinical and research experts from across the United States to solve the most challenging medical mysteries using advanced technologies.

UDN was established in 2014 with seven clinical sites located at medical institutions across the United States. As of 2019, twelve clinical sites were open.

== History ==
In 2008, the National Institute of Health (NIH) established the Undiagnosed Diseases Program (UDP), with the intent to provide medical care to patients with rare diseases seeking a diagnosis and to discover new pathways and mechanisms involved in disease. At the time, ongoing genomic research and advances in DNA sequencing strengthened the potential for successes in precision medicine, providing a stimulus to the objectives of the UDP. The UDP, initially founded within the NIH Intramural Research Program, has now evolved into the Undiagnosed Diseases Network (UDN) and is funded by the NIH Common Fund. Upon its launch, the UDN consisted of the UDP, six additional clinical sites around the nation, a coordinating center, two DNA sequencing cores, a model organisms screening center, a metabolomics core, and a central biorepository. In seven years, the UDP received 2954 complete applications and evaluated 863 individuals.

In September 2015, the UDN opened an online portal for patient applications, signifying the official launch of the UDN. By December 2019, 4077 patients had been referred to the UDN, and around 40% of the cases were accepted. 374 patients have received a diagnosis.

== Institutes and locations ==
=== Clinical sites ===
At clinical sites, accepted UDN participants undergo comprehensive medical examinations, family history studies, physical examinations, collection of biological specimens, laboratory tests, consultations, and imaging studies. Evaluations are typically conducted over a five-day period, with follow-up visits scheduled if necessary.

=== Central Biorepository ===
The UDN Central Biorepository (UDNCB) receives roughly 1,200 biological samples each year from the combined clinical sites. Through the UDN online portal, clinical sites can view, submit, and request samples, as well as review contact information for the UDNCB. Biological samples prioritized by the UDNCB include DNA, serum, plasma, urine, and peripheral blood mononuclear cells (PBMCs). The UDNCB is located at Vanderbilt University Medical Center in Nashville, Tennessee.

=== Sequencing core ===
The UDN sequencing core, located at Baylor College of Medicine (Houston, TX), receives blood samples from the clinical sites and uses blood-derived DNA to conduct whole-genome sequencing (WGS) and whole-exome sequencing (WES) on patients and relevant family members.

=== Metabolomics core ===
The UDN metabolomics core analyzes the biological samples collected in the UDN by performing untargeted metabolite profiling via analytical platforms such as GC-MS and NMR, targeted/quantitative metabolite profiling of key metabolites, and bioinformatics, and provides clinical interpretation to patients. The metabolomics core is located at Mayo Clinic in Rochester, Minnesota.

=== Model Organism Screening Centers ===
The two Model Organism Screening Centers (MOSCs) of the UDN are located at Baylor College of Medicine (Houston, TX) and Washington University in St. Louis (St. Louis, MO). These centers conduct research using the model organisms D. melanogaster (fruit fly), C. elegans (nematode worm), and D. rerio (zebrafish). By examining the effects of certain rare functional variants in these model organisms, the MOSCs investigate the contribution of patients' genetic variants to the pathogenicity of their diseases.

== See also ==
- William A. Gahl
