= Judith Fradkin =

American physician-scientist

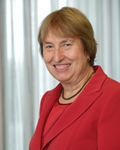
- Education: University of California, San Francisco (M.D.)
- Awards: Dr. Nathan Davis Award (2003)
- Scientific career
- Fields: Diabetes, endocrinology, and metabolic diseases
- Workplaces: National Institute of Diabetes and Digestive and Kidney Diseases

Judith E. Fradkin is an American physician-scientist. She was the director of the Division of Diabetes, Endocrinology, and Metabolic Diseases at the National Institute of Diabetes and Digestive and Kidney Diseases from 2000 to 2018.

== Education ==
Fradkin completed her medical degree from University of California, San Francisco. She was an intern and resident at Beth Israel Deaconess Medical Center and an endocrinology fellow at Yale School of Medicine.

== Career ==
Fradkin first came to NIDDK as a clinical associate in 1979 after completing her medical degree. In 1984, Fradkin became a NIDDK Division of Diabetes, Endocrinology, and Metabolic Diseases branch chief and subsequently served in roles as the division’s deputy director and acting director before being appointed as director in 2000. According to Griffin P. Rodgers, "under Dr. Fradkin’s leadership, the Institute launched ambitious clinical trials to advance the prevention and treatment of diabetes, including the TrialNet network to conduct clinical trials to prevent or delay the progression of type 1 diabetes; the Treatment Options for Type 2 Diabetes in Adolescents and Youth (TODAY) trial to compare treatment approaches to type 2 diabetes in children; HEALTHY, a school-based intervention to lower the risk factors for type 2 diabetes in children; the Vitamin D and type 2 diabetes (D2d) study assessing efficacy of vitamin D in type 2 diabetes prevention; the Restoring Insulin Secretion (RISE) studies; and the Glycemia Reduction Approaches in Diabetes (GRADE) study comparing type 2 diabetes medications."

A major component of Fradkin’s leadership tenure at NIDDK is the Special Statutory Funding Program for Type 1 Diabetes Research. Commonly known as the Special Diabetes Program, this program was introduced through legislation in 1997.

Fradkin worked closely with bipartisan Congressional leaders, many institutes and centers at NIH and other DHHS agencies, and the broad diabetes research community to plan and implement an extraordinary series of initiatives over the last 22 years to deploy the nearly $3 billion in dedicated appropriations for type 1 diabetes research. Fradkin led the Diabetes Mellitus Interagency Coordinating Committee, where she facilitated collaboration on diabetes among Federal entities. She also served on the Executive Committee of the National Diabetes Education Program, and she was a member of the Interagency Coordinating Committee on Human Growth Hormone and Creutzfeldt-Jakob Disease. She also treated people who sought care at the Walter Reed National Military Medical Center endocrinology clinic. Fradkin launched an important series of diabetes initiatives to advance the development of artificial pancreas and other diabetes management technologies and to develop innovative strategies to protect or replace beta cells in diabetes. She also prioritized research on obesity, insulin action, and animal models of diabetes.

Fradkin retired in December 2018 after nearly 40 years of service. Her leadership and oversight of research dedicated to the prevention, treatment, and cure of diabetes, and other metabolic and endocrine disorders, improved healthcare for millions of Americans. Around NIDDK, Fradkin was known for her attention to detail, ability to think quickly on her feet, broad knowledge, precision in communication, as well as her compassion, collegiality, wit, and generosity.

== Awards and honors ==
Fradkin’s work was recognized with many awards during her time in government. She received the American Medical Association’s Dr. Nathan Davis Award for outstanding public service in the advancement of public health in 2003, the JDRF Hero Award in 2010, the American Association of Clinical Endocrinologists Eugene T. Davidson, M.D., Award for Public Service in 2012, the JDRF David Rumbough Award for Scientific Excellence in 2015, and the C. Everett Koop Medal for Health Promotion and Awareness from the American Diabetes Association in 2018.

== Personal life ==
After retirement, Fradkin intends to travel and spend time with her grandson.
