= Gurdev Khush =

Indian agronomist and geneticist

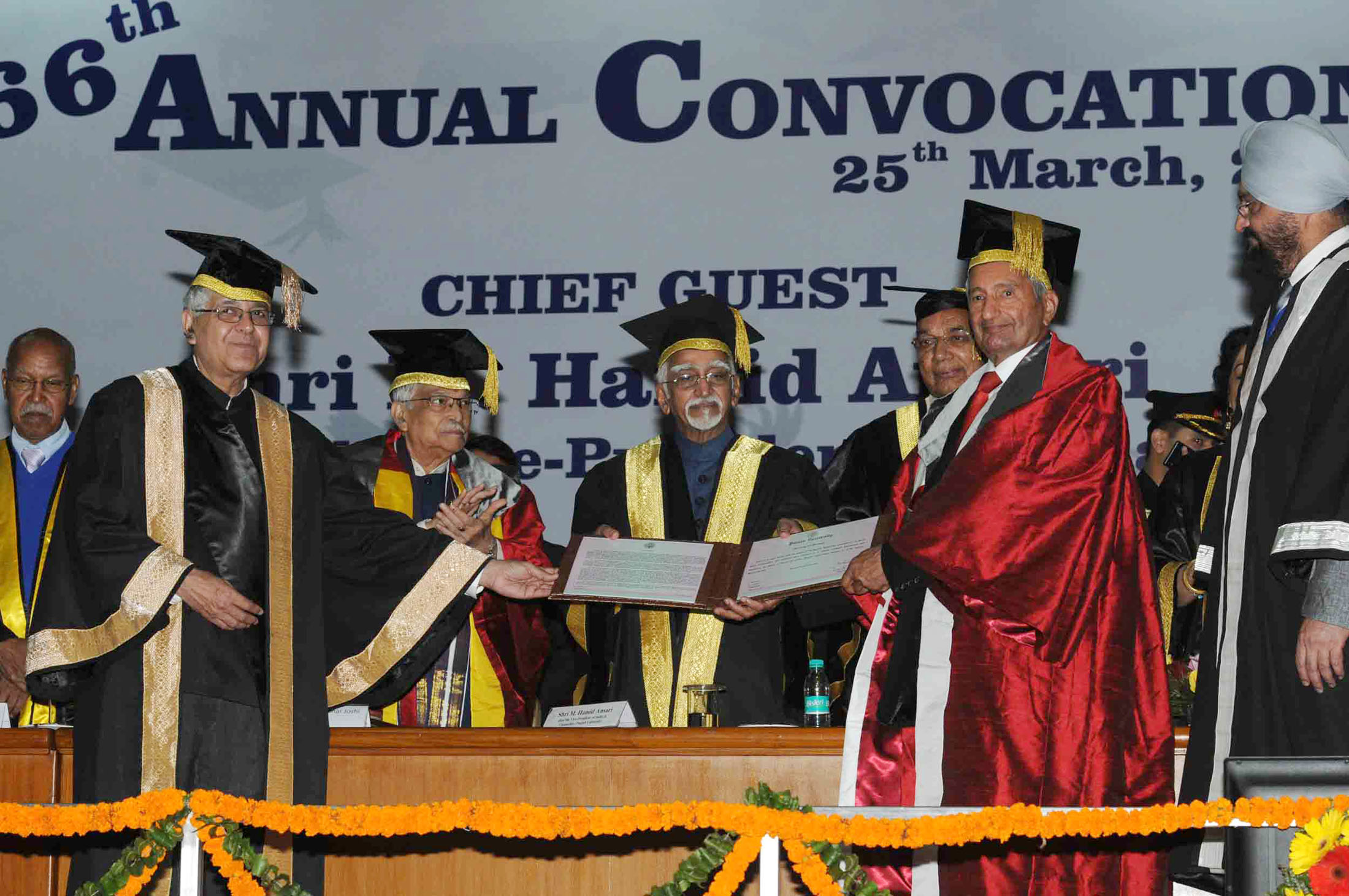
- The Vice President, Shri M. Hamid Ansari conferring D. Sc. (Honoris Causa) upon Prof. G.S. Khush, at the 66th Convocation of the Panjab University, in Chandigarh on March 25, 2017.
- Born: 22 August 1935 (age 91)
- Education: B.Sc Punjab Agricultural University (1955) Ph.D University of California, Davis (1960)
- Occupations: Agronomist and geneticist

Gurdev Singh Khush (born August 22, 1935) is an agronomist and geneticist who, along with mentor Henry Beachell, received the 1996 World Food Prize for his achievements in enlarging and improving the global supply of rice during a time of exponential population growth.

== Life and Education ==
Gurdev Singh Khush was born on August 22, 1935, in Rurkee, Jalandhar district, Punjab, India. He graduated with a B.Sc. from Punjab Agricultural University in 1955 and Ph.D. from the University of California, Davis (UC Davis) in 1960.

== Career ==
After serving as a faculty member of the University of California (UC) for seven years studying the tomato genome, he joined the International Rice Research Institute (IRRI) in the Philippines as Plant Breeder. He was appointed a Head of the Plant Breeding Department in 1972 where, in pursuit of ever-improved rice varieties to nourish the growing developing world and support its agricultural economies, he spent over twenty years directing and participating in genetic research and breeding. During that time he played a key role in the development of more than 300 innovative rice strains such as Semi-dwarf IR36. World rice production increased from 257 million tons in 1966 to 626 million tons in 2006.

Gurdev Singh Khush is widely known as the chief architect behind the development of innovative high-yielding rice varieties that revolutionized global rice production. He and his team developed over 300 rice varieties.

He retired from IRRI in February 2002 as Principal Plant Breeder and Head of Division of Plant Breeding Genetics and Biochemistry and returned to UC Davis as adjunct professor. He also served on the Life Sciences jury for the Infosys Prize in 2010.

== Contributions ==
Gurdev Singh Khush revolutionized global rice production and played a defining role in the Green Revolution. Over three decades, he developed over 300 rice varieties characterized by short stature, short growth period, strong resistance to lodging, and resistance to diseases and pests. These varieties are not only resilient to climate but are also three times more productive than traditional varieties, allowing farmers to harvest 6-7 tons of rice per hectare, compared to the 1-3 tons achieved with older varieties.

Dr. Khush's work at IRRI played a transformative role in increasing global rice production and ensuring food security in many developing countries. His scientific leadership contributed significantly to the success of the Green Revolution in Asia, helping to avert widespread famine and lift millions of people out of poverty.

This growth has had far-reaching consequences, contributing significantly to global food security, poverty reduction and economic growth, as well as promoting environmental sustainability through more efficient use of agricultural land and resources. For his work on rice breeding, which helped to alleviate global food security and poverty, Gurdev Khush was awarded the World Food Prize in 1996.

== Honours and awards ==
Khush has earned many awards, including the Borlaug Award (1977), the Japan Prize (1987), the World Food Prize (1996), Padma Shri (2000), VinFuture Prize 2023 and the Wolf Prize in Agriculture (2000). He was elected a Fellow of the Royal Society in 1995 and by the National Academy of Agricultural Sciences as their foreign fellow in 1991.

== Notable publications ==
- Peng, Shaobing; Khush, Gurdev S.; Virk, Parminder; Tang, Qiyuan; Zou, Yingbin (2008). "Progress in ideotype breeding to increase rice yield potential". Field Crops Research. 108 (1). Elsevier: 32–38. Bibcode:2008FCrRe.108...32P. doi:10.1016/j.fcr.2008.04.001. ISSN 0378-4290. S2CID 44234573.
