= Semi-dwarf IR36 =

Semi-dwarf IR36 is a hybrid rice variety developed by Gurdev Khush.

== History ==
By cross-breeding together IR8 with 13 parent varieties from six nations, Dr. Khush developed IR36, a semi-dwarf variety that proved highly resistant to a number of the major insect pests and diseases that raised farmers' rice yields and drove down prices of the staple food for Asian families. IR36 matures rapidly – 105 days compared to 130 days for IR8 and 150–170 days for traditional types – and produces the slender grain preferred in many countries. The combination of these characteristics soon made IR36 one of the most widely planted food crop varieties worldwide in just a few years. About 110,000 km² were planted with IR36 worldwide in 1981, a success which Dr. Khush topped with IR64 and again with IR72 in 1990.

The variety was one of many of the Green Revolution which replaced many local strains and genetic diversity previously found in rice paddies. It is estimated that over 100,000 local strains were grown in 1960, which have been largely replaced by hybrid varieties.
