= Aimée R. Kreimer =

American cancer epidemiologist

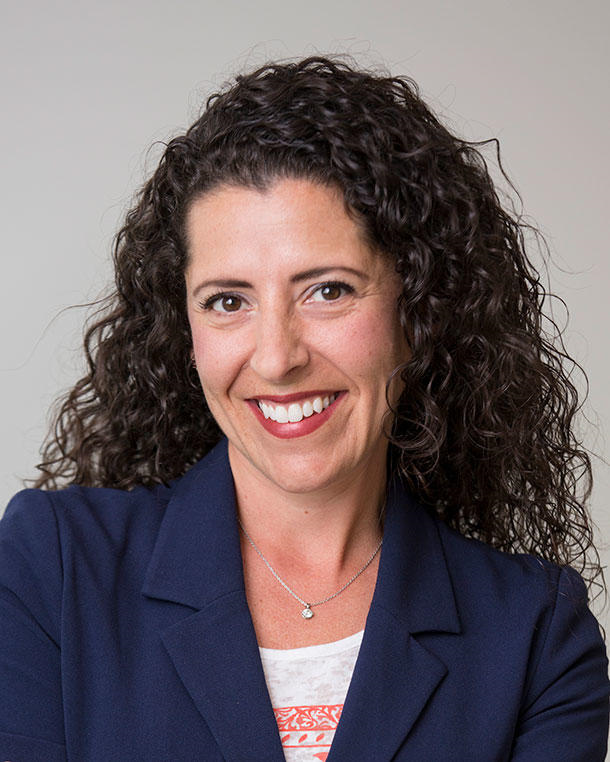
- Born: Aimée Rebecca Kreimer; August 19, 1975 (age 51); Washington, D.C., U.S.
- Education: University of Delaware; University of Virginia; Johns Hopkins Bloomberg School of Public Health
- Scientific career
- Fields: Cancer epidemiology, HPV, cancer prevention
- Workplaces: National Cancer Institute

Aimée Rebecca Kreimer (born August 19, 1975) is an American cancer epidemiologist who researches the etiology and prevention of human papillomavirus infection (HPV) and cancer prevention. She is a senior investigator in the infections and immunoepidemiology branch at the National Cancer Institute.

== Life ==
Kreimer was born August 19, 1975, in Washington, D.C. She completed a B.S. in Animal Science with a minor in Biology and a concentration in pre-veterinary medicine at the University of Delaware in May 1997. Kreimer earned a M.S. from the department of health evaluation sciences, division of biostatistics and epidemiology at the University of Virginia in May 1998. Her thesis was titled, Evaluation of the Effectiveness of Treatment with Cortisol in Physiologic Doses in Patients with Naturally Acquired Influenza A. Kreimer received a Ph.D. in infectious disease epidemiology from the Johns Hopkins Bloomberg School of Public Health. Her 2003 dissertation was titled, The descriptive epidemiology of oral human papilloma virus (HPV) infection: associations with high-risk sexual behaviors and HPV serostatus. Anthony J. Alberg was her doctoral advisor and Maura L. Gillison was her mentor. Kreimer conducted postdoctoral research at the International Agency for Research on Cancer and the National Cancer Institute (NCI).

Kreimer is a senior investigator in the NCI infections and immunoepidemiology branch (IIB). She studies the etiology and prevention of human papillomavirus (HPV) and cancers at multiple sites, including the head and neck and anogenital region, with a particular focus on translational research and cancer prevention. In 2018, she received the National Institutes of Health (NIH) Director's Award in the category of Science/Medicine for her outstanding achievements in HPV cancer research and leadership in the Costa Rica HPV Vaccine Trial. In 2021, she was elected by her peers to serve a three-year term as NCI division of cancer epidemiology and genetics (DCEG) Woman Scientific Advisor, and elected to the executive board of the International Papillomavirus Society.

== See also ==
- List of Johns Hopkins University people
- List of University of Delaware people
- List of University of Virginia people
