= William M. Thomas =

American politician (fl. 1868–1876)

South Carolina House of Representatives
- In office 1868–1876

Personal details
- Party: Republican

William M. Thomas (fl. 1868–1876) was an African-American Republican politician during the Reconstruction era. He was a minister affiliated with the African Methodist Episcopal Church. He represented Colleton County in the 1868 South Carolina Constitutional Convention and in the South Carolina House of Representatives from 1868 until 1876. He was also an officer in the state militia and was a delegate to the 1876 Republican National Convention. He was categorized as "colored". He and Joseph D. Boston were the only African Americans to serve all four terms during the Reconstruction era in the South Carolina House.
