= John T. Schiller =

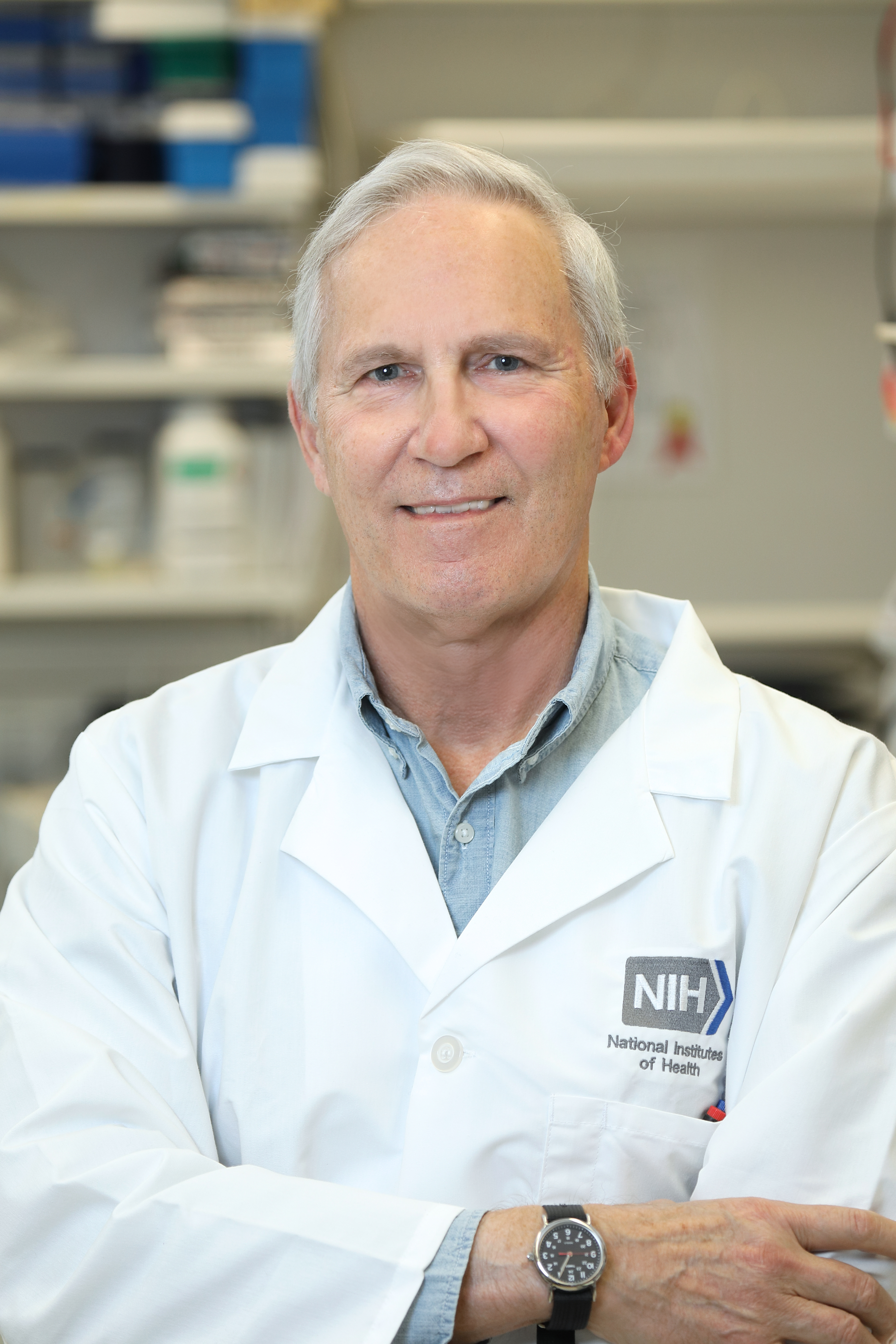
- Schiller in 2022
- Education: University of Wisconsin-Madison, University of Washington in Seattle
- Awards: Lasker–DeBakey Clinical Medical Research Award (2017)
- Scientific career
- Workplaces: National Cancer Institute (NCI)
- Academic advisors: Douglas R. Lowy

John T. Schiller is an NIH Distinguished Investigator and the deputy chief and head of the neoplastic disease section, laboratory of cellular oncology at the U.S. National Cancer Institute (NCI). With Douglas R. Lowy, he made key contributions to papillomavirus virus molecular biology and the development of the HPV vaccine. Schiller was the recipient of the National Medal of Technology and Innovation in 2014 and the Lasker-DeBakey Clinical Medical Research Award in 2017.

== Career and Research ==
Schiller earned his B.S. in molecular biology from the University of Wisconsin-Madison in 1975 and his Ph.D. from the University of Washington in Seattle in 1982. He joined Douglas R. Lowy's Laboratory of Cellular Oncology as a National Research Service Award postdoctoral fellow in 1983. In 1998, he became the chief of the neoplastic disease section and was designated as an NIH Distinguished Investigator in 2016. He was elected to the National Academy of Sciences in 2020.

In the early 1990s, Schiller and Lowy worked on the discovery and development of a virus-like particle vaccine of the human papillomavirus. That initial work would ultimately result in the development of the HPV vaccine. Further, they developed the critical assays for measuring the protective antibody responses to the virus, characterized who how the vaccines protect from cervicovaginal infection in vivo and initiated the clinical trials that led to the discovery and validation of single dose vaccine efficacy.

== Awards ==
- Dr. Nathan Davis Awards (2007)
- Service to America Medal – Federal Employee of the Year (2007)
- Albert B. Sabin Gold Medal (2011)
- American Society for Microbiology's Joseph Public Health Award (2014)
- National Medal of Technology and Innovation (2014)
- Lasker–DeBakey Clinical Medical Research Award (2017)
- Szent-Györgyi Prize for Progress in Cancer Research (2018)
- Stanford Drug Discovery Lifetime Achievement Award (2020)
- Prince Maidol Award (2022)
- VinFuture Grand Prize (2025)
