= Npj Clean Water =

npj Clean Water
- Discipline: Water resources, Environmental science, Water treatment
- Language: English

Publication details
- History: 2018–present
- Publisher: Springer Nature
- Frequency: Continuous
- Open access: Open access
- License: CC BY
- Impact factor: 11.4 (2024)

Standard abbreviations
- ISO 4: npj Clean Water

Indexing
- ISSN: 2059-7037 (print); 2059-7037 (web)

Links
- Journal homepage; Online access

npj Clean Water is a continuous peer-reviewed open access scientific journal covering research on water quality, water treatment, and sustainable water management. It is published by Springer Nature.

The journal publishes research articles, reviews, and perspectives focusing on drinking water safety, wastewater treatment, water reuse, environmental monitoring, and technologies for improving global access to clean water.

== Abstracting and indexing ==
The journal is abstracted and indexed in, for example:

- Science Citation Index Expanded
- Scopus

According to the Journal Citation Reports, the journal has a 2024 impact factor of 11.4.
