= William A. Gahl =

American geneticist

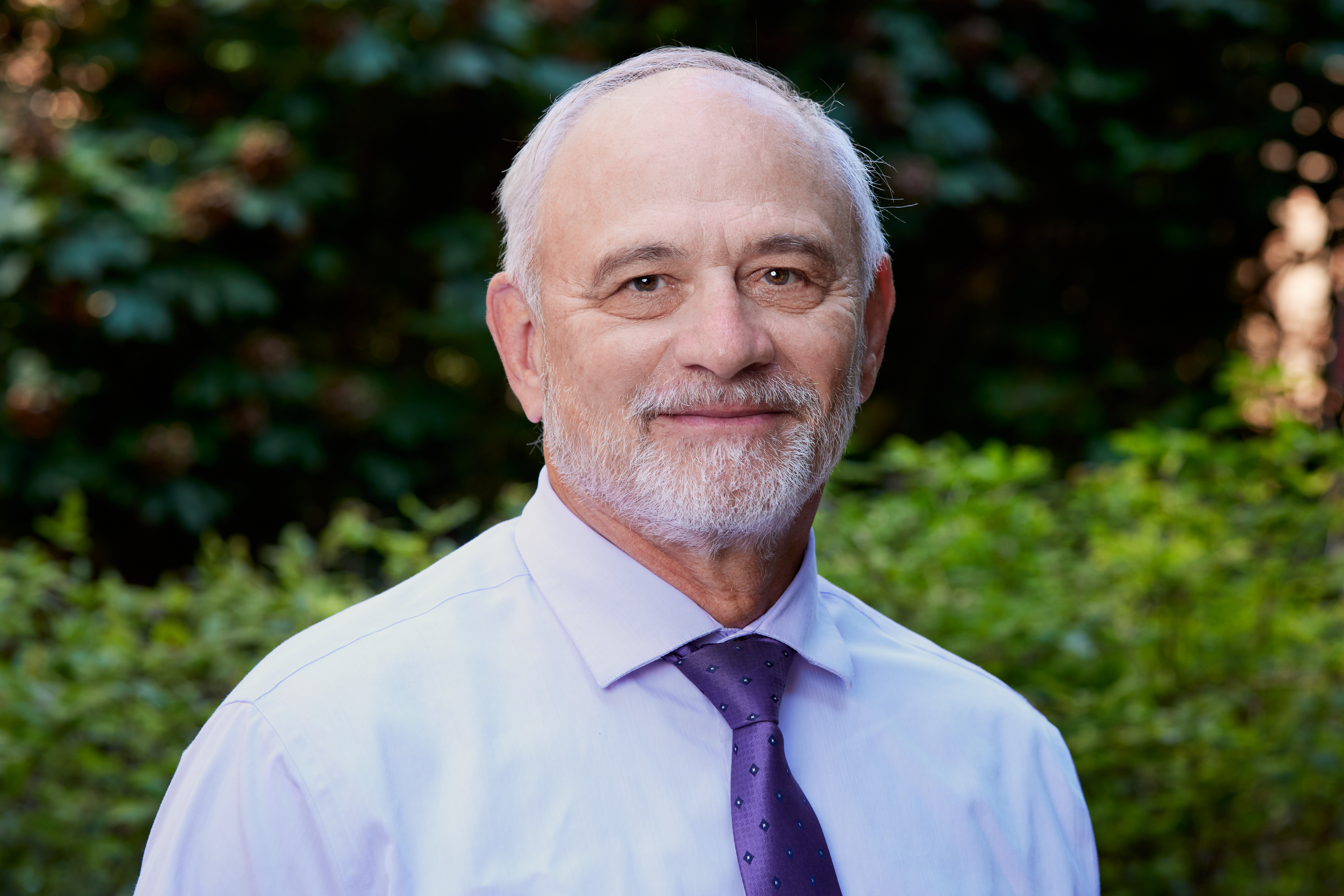

William A. Gahl formerly served (2002 to 2019) as the Clinical Director of the National Human Genome Research Institute at the NIH main campus in Bethesda, MD.

Gahl graduated with a BS degree from Massachusetts Institute of Technology in 1972. He earned his MD degree in 1976 and his PhD degree in 1981 degree from the University of Wisconsin, Madison. Gahl is board-certified in medical geneticist, biochemical genetics, and pediatrics.

Gahl conducts research on rare inborn errors of metabolism, focusing on the observation and treatment of patients in the clinic as well as carrying out biochemical, molecular biological, and cell biological investigations in the laboratory. His group focuses on a number of disorders, including cystinosis, Hermansky-Pudlak syndrome, alkaptonuria, and sialic acid diseases.

Gahl was the leader in creating the National Institutes of Health Undiagnosed Diseases Program (UDP). The UDP is a trans-National Institutes of Health (NIH) initiative that focuses on the most puzzling medical cases referred to the NIH Clinical Center in Bethesda, Md. The program's success led to the creation of the Undiagnosed Diseases Network, which eventually expanded the effort to encompass eleven additional clinical sites at academic medical centers across the US, along with a DNA sequencing core, a coordinating center, a metabolomics core, a central biorepository, and a model organisms screening center.

He was elected to the National Academy of Medicine in 2018.

== Selected publications ==
=== Papers ===
- Phornphutkul C., Introne W.J., Perry M.B., Bernardini I., Murphey M.D., Fitzpatrick D.L., Anderson P.D., Huizing M., Anikster Y., Gerber L.H., Gahl W.A. Natural history of alkaptonuria. N Engl J Med, 347:2111-2121. 2002.
- Gahl W.A., Thoene J.G., Schneider J.A. Cystinosis. N Engl J Med, 347:111-121. 2002.
- Kleta R., Romeo E., Ristic Z., Ohura T., Stuart C., Arcos-Burgos M., Dave M.H., Wagner C.A., Camargo S.R.M., Inoue S., Matsuura N., Helip-Wooley A., Bockenhauer D., Warth R., Bernardini I., Visser G., Eggermann T., Lee P., Chairoungdua A., Jutabha P., Babu E., Nilwarangkoon S., Anzai N., Kanai Y., Verrey F., Gahl W.A., Koizumi A. Mutations in SLC6A19, encoding BoAT1, cause Hartnup disorder. Nature Genet, 36(9):999-1002. 2004.
- Gunay-Aygun, M., Huizing, M, Gahl, W.A. Molecular defects that affect platelet dense granules. Thromb Haemostasis, 30(5):537-47. 2004.
- Sonies, B.C., Almajid, P., Kleta, R., Bernardini, I., Gahl, W.A. Swallowing dysfunction in 101 patients with nephropathic cystinosis: Benefit of long-term cysteamine therapy. Medicine, 84:137-146, 2005.
- Suwannarat, P., O'Brien, K., Perry, M.B., Sebring, N., Bernardini, I., Kaiser-Kupfer, M.I., Rubin, B.I., Tsilou, E., Gerber, L.H., Gahl, W.A. Use of nitisinone in patients with alkaptonuria. Metabolism Clin Exptl, 54:719-728, 2005.
- Helip-Wooley, A., Westbroek, W., Dorward, H., Mommaas, M., Boissy, R., Gahl, W.A., Huizing, M. Hermansky-Pudlak syndrome type-3 protein interacts with clathrin and trafficks lysosome-related organelles. BMC Cell Biology, 6:33, 2005.
- Ueda, M., O'Brien, K., Rosing, D.R., Ling, A., Kleta, R., MacAreavey, D., Bernardini, I., Gahl, W.A. Coronary artery and other vascular calcifications in cystinosis patients after kidney transplantation. Clin J Am Soc Nephrol, 1:555-562, 2006.
- Helip-Wooley, A., Boissy, R.E., Westbroek, W., Dorward, H., Koshoffer, A., Huizing, M., Gahl, W.A. Improper trafficking of melanocyte-specific proteins in Hermansky-Pudlak syndrome type-5. J Invest Dermatol, 127:1471-1478. 2007.
- Galeano, B., Klootwijk, R., Manoli, I., Sun, M-S., Ciccone, C., Darvish, D., Starost M.F., Zerfas, P.M., Hoffmann, V.J., Hoogstraten-Miller, S., Krasnewich, D.M., Gahl, W.A., Huizing M. Mutation in the key enzyme of sialic acid biosynthesis causes severe glomerular proteinuria and is rescued by N-acetylmannosamine. J Clin Invest, 117:1585-1594. 2007.

=== Book chapters ===
- Gahl W.A., Thoene J., Schneider J.A. Cystinosis: A Disorder of Lysosomal Membrane Transport. In: Scriver CR, Beaudet AL, Sly WS, Valle D, Childs B, Kinzler KW, Vogelstein B. The Metabolic and Molecular Basis of Inherited Disease. McGraw-Hill Companies, Inc., Eighth Edition, pp. 5085–5108. 2001.
- Aula P., Gahl W.A. Sialic Acid Storage Diseases. In: Scriver CR, Beaudet AL, Sly WS, Valle D, Childs B, Kinzler KW, Vogelstein B. The Metabolic and Molecular Basis of Inherited Disease. McGraw-Hill Companies, Inc., Eighth Edition, pp. 5109–5120. 2001.
