= Douglas R. Lowy =

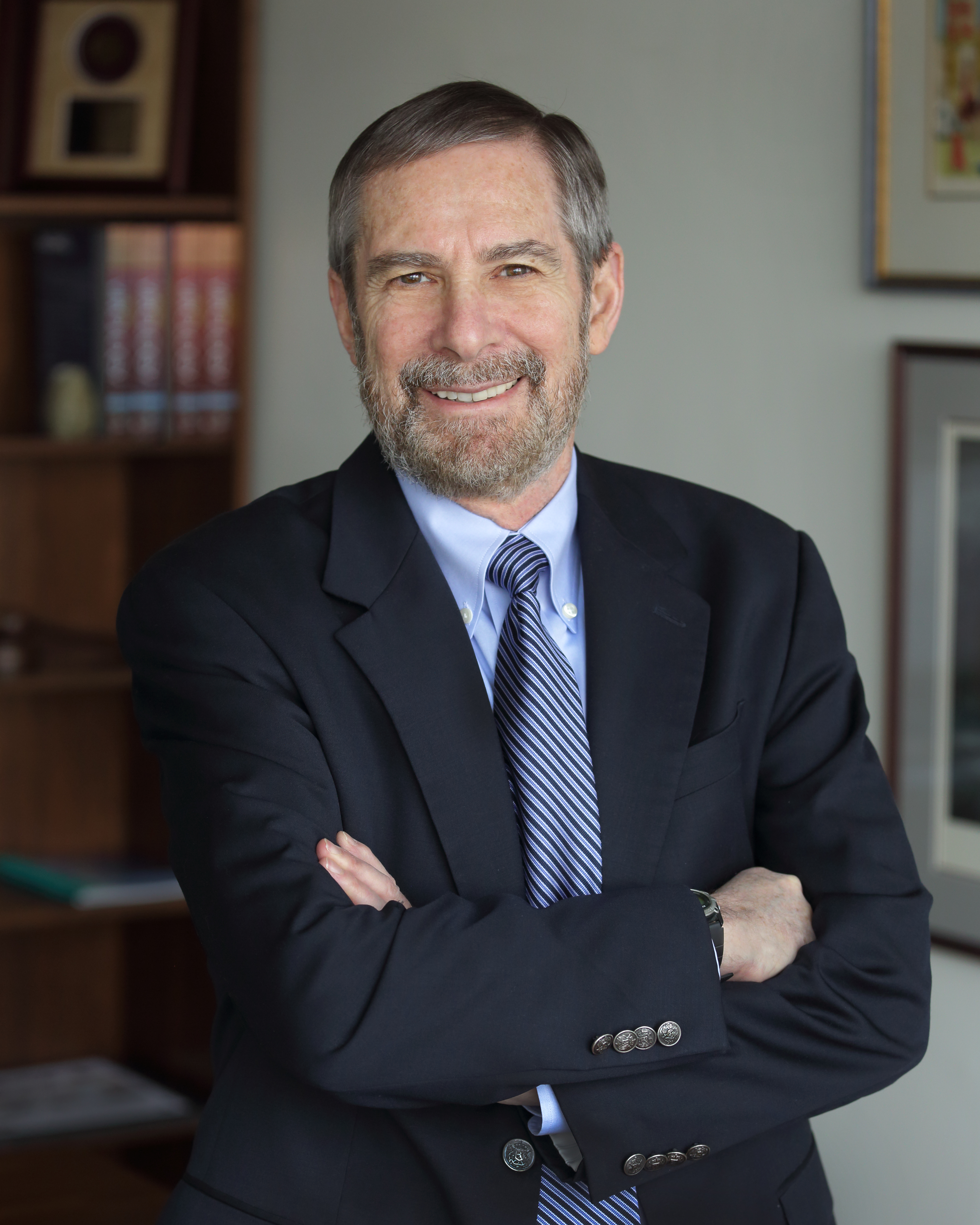
- Douglas R. Lowy, MD, Principal Deputy Director, National Cancer Institute
- Education: Amherst College; New York University School of Medicine
- Awards: Lasker-DeBakey Clinical Medical Research Award (2017); Sabin Gold Medal (2011); VinFuture Grand Prize (2025)
- Scientific career
- Fields: Cancer biology

Douglas R. Lowy (born c. 1940s) is the current Principal Deputy Director of the U.S. National Cancer Institute (NCI) and Chief of the Laboratory of Cellular Oncology within the Center for Cancer Research at NCI. Lowy served as Acting Director of NCI between April 2015 and October 2017 following the resignation of Harold E. Varmus, M.D., and again between April and November 2019, while Director Norman Sharpless served as the Acting Commissioner of the U.S. Food and Drug Administration. He resumed the role of Acting Director on May 1, 2022, when Sharpless stepped down until October 3, 2022 when Monica Bertagnolli was appointed Director. He resumed the role again in November 2023 after Bertagnolli resigned to serve as director of the National Institutes of Health.

Lowy has served as Deputy Director of the NCI since 2010, alongside former directors Varmus and Sharpless and current director Bertagnolli. Lowy was co-recipient (along with Dr. John T. Schiller) of the National Medal of Technology and Innovation in 2014 and the Lasker-DeBakey Clinical Medical Research Award in 2017.

== Biography ==
Lowy received his medical degree from the New York University School of Medicine, and trained in internal medicine at Stanford University and dermatology at Yale. He has directed a research laboratory at NCI since 1975, after receiving training as a Research Associate in the National Institute of Allergy and Infectious Diseases. Lowy is a member of the National Academy of Sciences (NAS) and of its Institute of Medicine. For his joint research with John T. Schiller on technology that enabled the development of preventive human papillomavirus (HPV) vaccines, he and Schiller received the 2007 Samuel J. Heyman Service to America Medal, the 2011 Albert B. Sabin Gold Medal, the 2012 National Medal of Technology and Innovation (awarded in 2014), and the Lasker-DeBakey Clinical Medical Research Award in 2017. He has also received the National Medal of Honor for Basic Research from the American Cancer Society.

== Research activities ==
Lowy's HPV research, conducted in collaboration with John T. Schiller, has characterized the HPV oncoproteins E6 and E7.

== Awards ==
- Nathan Davis Award, American Medical Association (2007)
- Service to America Medal, Partnership for Public Service (2007)
- Humanitarian Award, American Skin Association (2007)
- Dorothy P. Landon-AACR Prize for Translational Cancer Research (2007)
- Novartis Prize for Clinical Immunology, Rio de Janeiro (2007)
- Research and Hope Award for Academic or Public Research, National Cancer Institute (2013)
- Harrington Prize for Innovation in Medicine (2015)
- Lasker-DeBakey Clinical Medical Research Award (2017)
- Szent-Györgyi Prize for Progress in Cancer Research (2018)
- VinFuture Grand Prize (2025)
