= Richard L. Guerrant =

American infectious disease researcher

Richard L. Guerrant (born July 21, 1943) is an American physician, medical school professor, and medical researcher, specializing in infectious diseases and tropical medicine.

== Biography ==
Guerrant received his bachelor's degree from Davidson College and his M.D. from the University of Virginia School of Medicine. He completed his residency in internal medicine and infectious diseases at Harvard Medical Service at Boston City Hospital, where Maxwell Finland was his supervising attending physician and mentor.

After his cholera field research in Bangladesh, he returned to the University of Virginia School of Medicine. There he became a professor and the founding director of the Center for Global Health. He is the author or co-author of over 700 articles and the co-editor of several books.

In field studies, particularly in Brazil, he and his colleagues investigated the developmental problems of children who suffered from persistent diarrheal diseases in the critical first years of their lives. These investigations showed that such diseases stunted growth and harmed cognitive skills. The pathological cognitive effects, involving losses up to 10 IQ points, were linguistically not phonetic, but semantic, similar to the cognitive deficits in Alzheimer's patients. Guerrant and his team also found that APOE-ε4, the main risk allele in Alzheimer's disease, protects children against such cognitive losses due to diarrhea. This protection is a possible explanation for the spread of the allele APOE-ε4. This unexpected effect of the allele APOE-ε4 is analogous to the role of sickle cell anemia as a side effect of protection against malaria and the allele associated with cystic fibrosis as protection against cholera and other diarrheal diseases. He is continuing the research with a grant from the Bill and Melinda Gates Foundation.

The Infectious Diseases Society of America honored Guerrant with the Joseph E. Lectureship in 1993 and the Walter E. Stamm Mentor Award in 2009. In 1997 he was the president of the American Society of Tropical Medicine and Hygiene (ASTMH), was named Henderson Innovator of the Year at the University of Virginia, and received the Emilio Ribas Medal from the Sociedade Brasileira de Infectologia (Brazilian Society of Infectious Diseases). In 2002 he gave the Wesley Spink Memorial Lecture at the University of Minnesota's Department of Medicine. In 2003 Guerrant was elected a member of the National Academy of Medicine. He received in 2008 the Walter Reed Medal from the ASTMH and in 2014 the Maxwell Finland Award from the National Foundation for Infectious Diseases.

Richard L. Guerrant and his wife Nancy B. Guerrant established the Richard and Nancy Guerrant Center for Global Health Scholar Award at the University of Virginia. The couple have two sons and a daughter.

== Selected publications ==
=== Articles ===
- Marshall, B.J.; Barrett, L.J.; Prakash, C.; McCallum, R.W.; Guerrant, R.L. (1990). "Urea protects Helicobacter (Campylobacter) pylori from the bactericidal effect of acid". Gastroenterology. 99 (3): 697–702. doi:10.1016/0016-5085(90)90957-3. PMID 2379775.
- Guerrant, D. I.; Moore, S. R.; Lima, A. A.; Patrick, P. D.; Schorling, J. B.; Guerrant, R. L. (1999). "Association of early childhood diarrhea and cryptosporidiosis with impaired physical fitness and cognitive function four-seven years later in a poor urban community in northeast Brazil". The American Journal of Tropical Medicine and Hygiene. 61 (5): 707–713. doi:10.4269/ajtmh.1999.61.707. PMID 10586898. S2CID 7040139.
- Guerrant, Richard L.; Van Gilder, Thomas; Steiner, Ted S.; Thielman, Nathan M.; Slutsker, Laurence; Tauxe, Robert V.; Hennessy, Thomas; Griffin, Patricia M.; DuPont, Herbert; Bradley Sack, R.; Tarr, Phillip; Neill, Marguerite; Nachamkin, Irving; Reller, L. Barth; Osterholm, Michael T.; Bennish, Michael L.; Pickering, Larry K.; Infectious Diseases Society of America (2001). "Practice Guidelines for the Management of Infectious Diarrhea". Clinical Infectious Diseases. 32 (3): 331–351. doi:10.1086/318514. PMID 11170940.
- Kosek, Margaret; Bern, Caryn; Guerrant, Richard L. (2003). "The global burden of diarrhoeal disease, as estimated from studies published between 1992 and 2000" (PDF). Bulletin of the World Health Organization. 81 (3): 197–204. PMC 2572419. PMID 12764516.
- Checkley, William; Buckley, Gillian; Gilman, Robert H.; Assis, Ana MO; Guerrant, Richard L.; Morris, Saul S.; Mølbak, Kåre; Valentiner-Branth, Palle; Lanata, Claudio F.; Black, Robert E.; Childhood Malnutrition Infection Network (2008). "Multi-country analysis of the effects of diarrhoea on childhood stunting". International Journal of Epidemiology. 37 (4): 816–830. doi:10.1093/ije/dyn099. PMC 2734063. PMID 18567626.
- Guerrant, Richard L.; Oriá, Reinaldo B.; Moore, Sean R.; Oriá, Mônica OB; Lima, Aldo AM (2008). "Malnutrition as an enteric infectious disease with long-term effects on child development". Nutrition Reviews. 66 (9): 487–505. doi:10.1111/j.1753-4887.2008.00082.x. PMC 2562291. PMID 18752473.
- Petri, William A.; Miller, Mark; Binder, Henry J.; Levine, Myron M.; Dillingham, Rebecca; Guerrant, Richard L. (2008). "Enteric infections, diarrhea, and their impact on function and development". Journal of Clinical Investigation. 118 (4): 1277–1290. doi:10.1172/JCI34005. PMC 2276781. PMID 18382740.
- Guerrant, Richard L.; Deboer, Mark D.; Moore, Sean R.; Scharf, Rebecca J.; Lima, Aldo A. M. (2013). "The impoverished gut—a triple burden of diarrhoea, stunting and chronic disease". Nature Reviews Gastroenterology & Hepatology. 10 (4): 220–229. doi:10.1038/nrgastro.2012.239. PMC 3617052. PMID 23229327.
- Checkley, William; White, A Clinton; Jaganath, Devan; Arrowood, Michael J.; Chalmers, Rachel M.; Chen, Xian-Ming; Fayer, Ronald; Griffiths, Jeffrey K.; Guerrant, Richard L.; Hedstrom, Lizbeth; Huston, Christopher D.; Kotloff, Karen L.; Kang, Gagandeep; Mead, Jan R.; Miller, Mark; Petri, William A.; Priest, Jeffrey W.; Roos, David S.; Striepen, Boris; Thompson, R C Andrew; Ward, Honorine D.; Van Voorhis, Wesley A.; Xiao, Lihua; Zhu, Guan; Houpt, Eric R. (2015). "A review of the global burden, novel diagnostics, therapeutics, and vaccine targets for cryptosporidium". The Lancet Infectious Diseases. 15 (1): 85–94. doi:10.1016/S1473-3099(14)70772-8. PMC 4401121. PMID 25278220.
- Platts-Mills, James A. with 29 co-authors including Richard L. Guerrant; et al. (2015). "Pathogen-specific burdens of community diarrhoea in developing countries: A multisite birth cohort study (MAL-ED)". The Lancet Global Health. 3 (9): e564–e575. doi:10.1016/S2214-109X(15)00151-5. PMC 7328884. PMID 26202075.

=== Books ===
- Guerrant, Richard L.; Walker, David; Weller, Peter, eds. (1999). Tropical Infectious Diseases: Principles, Pathogens, and Practices (1st ed.). Churchill Livingston; 2 vols.; 2nd edition, 2006; Guerrant, Richard L.; Walker, David H.; Weller, Peter F. (5 April 2011). Tropical Infectious Diseases: Principles, Pathogens and Practice E-Book. Elsevier Health Sciences. ISBN 978-1-4377-3777-6.
- Guerrant, Richard L. (1994). Tropical and Travel-associated Diseases. Current Science. ISBN 978-1-85922-129-7; 114 pages
- Guerrant, Richard L.; Auxiliadora de Souza, M.; Nations, Marilyn K., eds. (1996). At the Edge of Development: Health Crises in a Transitional Society. Durham, North Carolina: Carolina Academic Press; photography by Cynthia Lee Vukasovich
- Guerrant, Richard L.; Walker, David H.; Weller, Peter F., eds. (2001). Essentials of Tropical Infectious Diseases. New York: Churchill Livingstone.
- Guerrant, Richard L. (October 2018). Evolution of Evolution: The Survival Value of Caring. Cambridge Scholars. ISBN 978-1-5275-1452-2; 125 pages
