= Maxwell Finland Award =

American science award

Maxwell Finland Award for Scientific Achievement
- Awarded for: "outstanding contributions to the understanding of infectious diseases and public health"
- Sponsored by: National Foundation for Infectious Diseases
- First award: 1988
- Final award: 2021
- Currently held by: William A. Petri
- Website: awards.nfid.org/maxwell-finland-award-for-scientific-achievement/

The Maxwell Finland Award for Scientific Achievement is an award given annually by the National Foundation for Infectious Diseases to a scientist who has made "outstanding contributions to the understanding of infectious diseases or public health," based on criteria that include "excellence in clinical and/or research activities; participation in the training of future leaders in the field; and positive impact on the health of humankind." The award is named after epidemiologist Maxwell Finland, who investigated antimicrobial resistance. The first award was given in 1988.

== Past winners ==
- 1988: C. Everett Koop
- 1989: Anthony S. Fauci
- 1991: P. Roy Vagelos
- 1992: Mrs. Albert Lasker and Michael E. DeBakey
- 1993: Arthur Ashe
- 1994: Elizabeth Dole
- 1995: Dale Bumpers and Betty F. Bumpers
- 1996: Paul G. Rogers
- 1997: Joshua Lederberg
- 1998: Maurice Hilleman
- 1999: Stanley Falkow
- 2000: R. Gordon Douglas, Jr.
- 2001: Robert Austrian
- 2002: Jerome O. Klein
- 2003: George W. Comstock
- 2004: George H. McCracken, Jr.
- 2005: John G. Bartlett
- 2006: Robert C. Moellering, Jr.
- 2007: Herbert L. DuPont
- 2008: Martin S. Hirsch
- 2009: Stanley A. Plotkin
- 2010: Richard P. Wenzel
- 2011: R. Palmer Beasley
- 2012: George L. Drusano
- 2013: Paul Offit
- 2014: Richard L. Guerrant
- 2015: Samuel Katz
- 2016: Diane E. Griffin
- 2017: Myron M. Levine
- 2018: Kathryn M. Edwards
- 2019: Anne Gershon
- 2020: Claire V. Broome
- 2021: William A. Petri
- 2022: Barney S. Graham

== See also ==
- List of biomedical science awards
