= M. O. T. Iyengar =

Indian medical entomologist

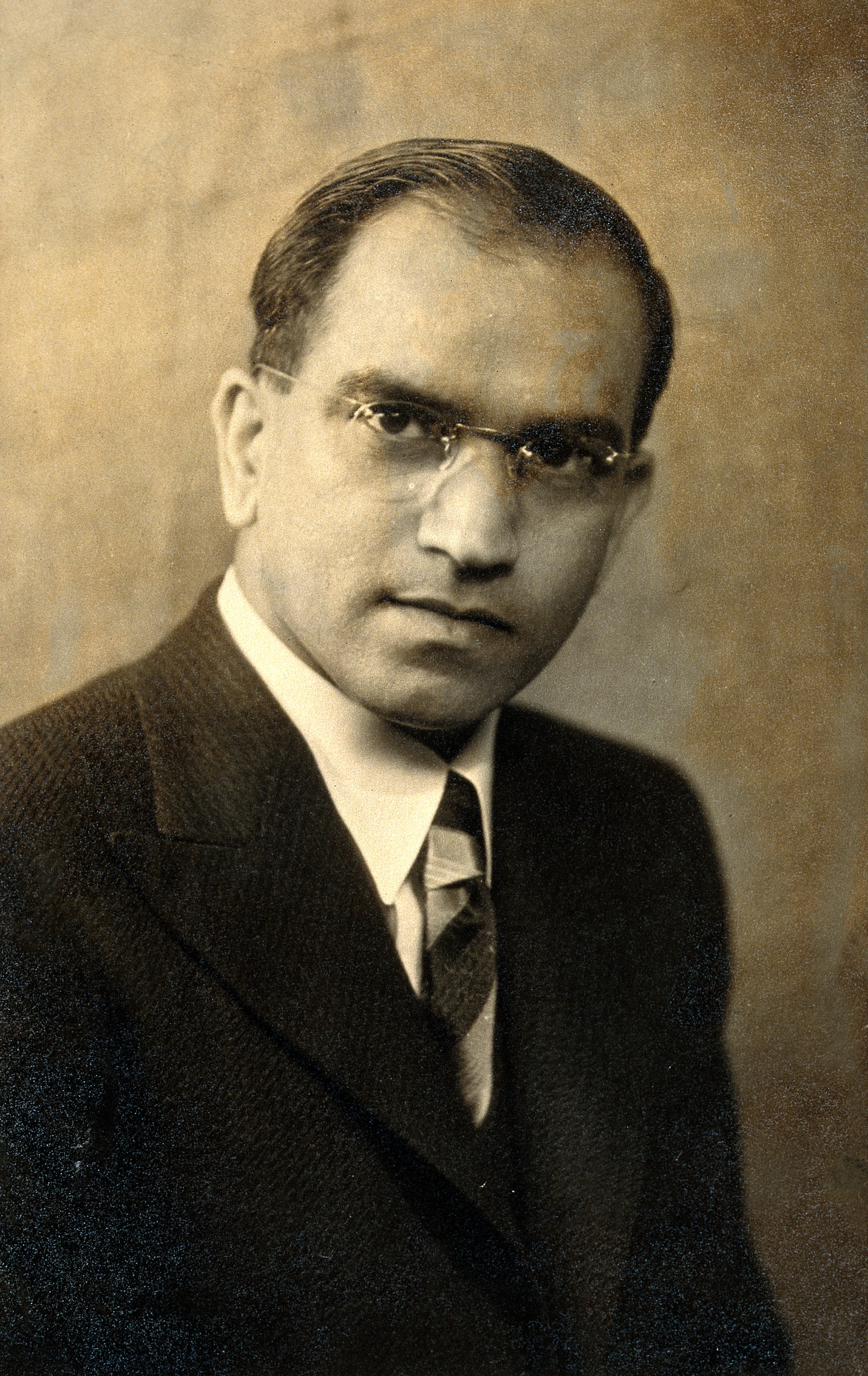

Mandayam Osuri Tirunarayana Iyengar (6 February 1895 – 16 September 1972) was an Indian medical entomologist who worked on management of filaria and malaria vectors. He was employed as an entomologist in the Department of Malaria Research, Bengal. The mermithid parasite Romanomermis iyengari and the mosquito species Culex iyengari are named after him.

== Life and work ==
Iyengar was born in a prominent Madras family, his father M.O. Alasingrachariar was a senior judge in the Madras High Court, and an older brother was the botanist M.O.P. Iyengar. After studying at the Hindu High School and graduating from the Presidency College, Madras he joined as an entomologist in-charge in the Bengal Malaria Research laboratory in Calcutta from 1918. He also taught medical parasitology and entomology for public health students. He served as a professor of medical entomology at the School of Tropical Medicine in Calcutta between 1922 and 1923. He also maintained an interest in botany, especially in association with aquatic habitats where he was studying mosquitoes, and described the floral biology of Monochoria and published with his brother on Characium (algae) associated with the larvae of Anopheles in 1932. He worked under the aegis of the Rockefeller Foundation for the Travancore State between 1931 and 1934 studying filariasis on which he served as a consultant for the World Health Organization working in many parts of the world including Afghanistan, the Maldives, New Guinea, Samoa, and Thailand. He collaborated with other malariologists around the world including P.A. Buxton, Wilhelm Schüffner, Henri Galliard, N.H. Swellengrebel and P.G. Shute. He surveyed natural control measures of mosquito larvae and identified fungi in the Coelomomyces group and a mermithid with potential for use in control. A mermithid, named after him as Romanomermis iyengari has found continued use in the management of anophelines around the world. Other findings of his included the observation that microfilaria that had been injested with blood by mosquitoes, entered the haemocoel not from the stomach wall as had been earlier thought but through the wall of the proventriculus. Iyengar also published a couple of notes in entomology that were not in his professional line of work. These include notes on adult coprid beetles emerging from human intestines with faeces. The Dr M.O.T. Iyengar Memorial Award was instituted in 1983 by his wife Mrs Rukmani Iyengar.

== Publications ==
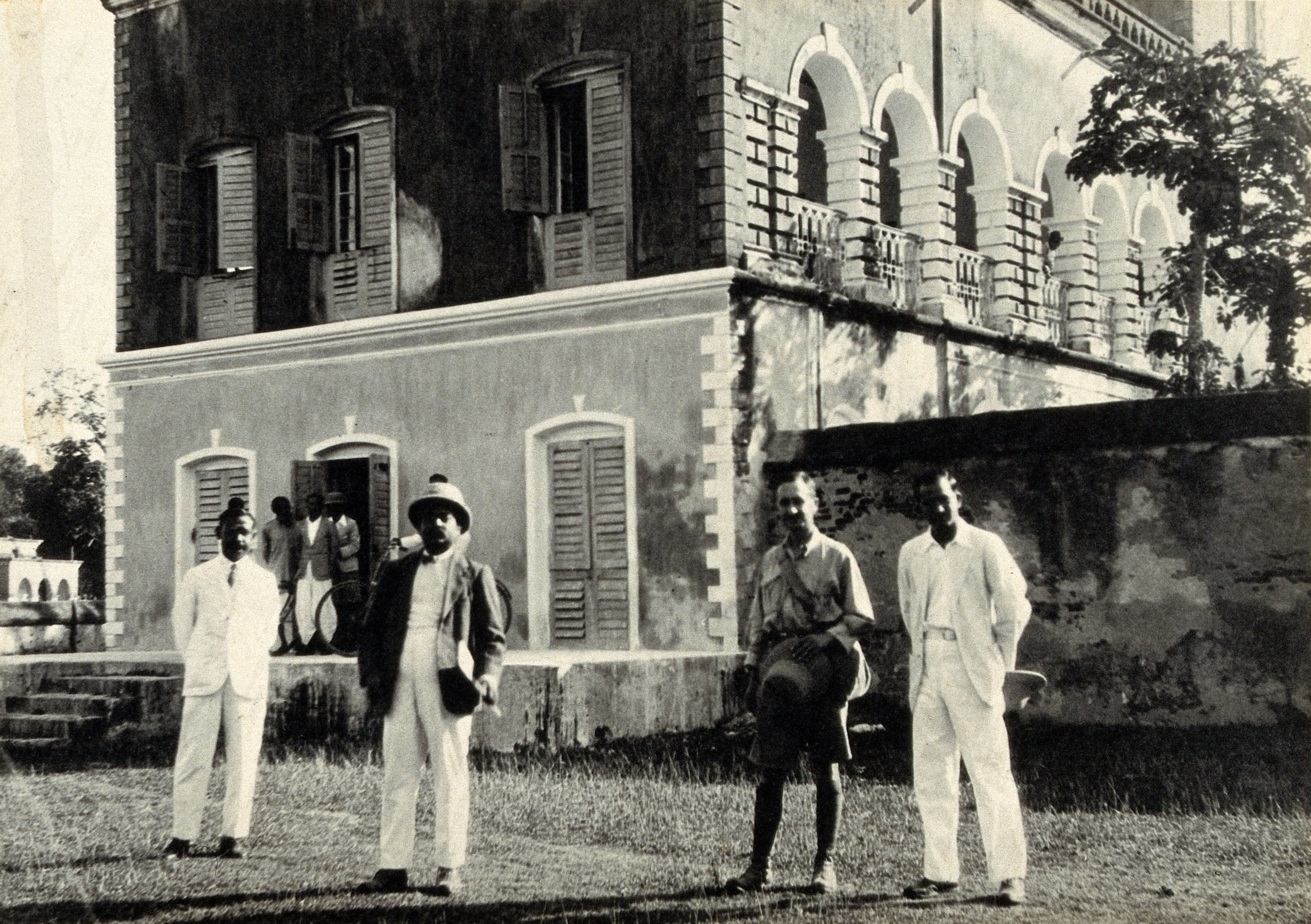
Swellengrebel with Iyengar (right-most in white) at Calcutta, c. 1924

A complete list of publications is provided in Iyengar & Gandhi (2009). Some major publications include:

- "A note on grappling tail-hooks in anopheline larvae" . Indian J. Med. Res. Vol. 9. pp. 630–633. 1922 – via Wikisource.
- On the biology of the flowers of Monochoria. J. Indian Bot. Soc, 170-173, April 1923
- The anopheline fauna of a swamp in Bangalore. Indian J. Med. Res.,13:697-702,1926
- Infestation of the human intestines by coprid beetles. Indian Med. Gaz., 63, 365-369, 1928.
- The larva of Anopheles turkhudi. Indian J. Med. Res., 17:1189-1192, 1930
- Filariasis in North Travancore. Indian J. Med. Res., 20, 671-672, 1933
- Rat-flea survey in Peermade District, Travancore. Indian J. Med. Res., 21:723-730,1934
- The identification of common rat-fleas of India. Indian J. Med. Res., 22:675-686,1935
- Public health aspects of filariasis in India. Indian Med. Gaz, 72:300-307, 1937.
- Naturalistic control of the breeding of Anopheles sundaicus by means of Eichomia cover. J. Malar. Inst. India, 6:309-310,1946.
- Mosquitoes of the Maldive Islands. Bull. Ent. Res., 46:1-10, 1955. (with M.A.U. Menon).
- Infection experiments with a fungus (Coelomomyces) which kills malarial mosquitoes. Science, 158, 526, 1967. (with J.N. Couch and C.J. Umphlett)
- Developmental Stages Of Filariae In Mosquitoes. 5th. Pacif. Comm. Tech. Pap., No. 104, 11 pages, 1957
