= R. Palmer Beasley =

American epidemiologist

- Born: April 29, 1936; Glendale, California, U.S.
- Died: August 25, 2012 (aged 76); Houston, Texas, U.S.
- Education: Dartmouth College Harvard Medical School University of Washington University of California, San Francisco University of Texas Health Science Center at Houston
- Known for: Pioneer research on causal link between hepatitis B virus and liver cancer
- Awards: King Faisal International Prize (1985); Charles S. Mott Prize (1987); Prince Mahidol Award (1999)
- Scientific career
- Fields: Medicine, epidemiology, public health
- Workplaces: University of Texas Health Science Center at Houston School of Public Health
- Doctoral advisor: Maxwell Finland
- Notable students: Xifeng Wu

Robert Palmer Beasley (April 29, 1936 – August 25, 2012) was an American physician, public health educator and epidemiologist whose work on hepatitis B involved extensive investigations in Taiwan. That work established that hepatitis B virus (HBV) is a primary cause of liver cancer and that hepatitis B virus is transmitted from mother to infant during childbirth. Beasley and his colleagues also proved that HBV mother-to-infant transmission is preventable by at-birth vaccination. Due to this work, the World Health Assembly designated HBV as the seventh global vaccine in 1992. He later became the author of HBV immunization policies for the World Health Organization.

Beasley was also an authority on public health education. He served as the Dean of the University of Texas Health Science Center at Houston (UTHealth) School of Public Health (UTSPH) from 1987 to 2004. During this period he established the Center for Infectious Diseases which is now headed by Herbert L. DuPont, an expert in infectious disease. Beasley and Dupont have been responsible for a number of efforts to establish international programs.

During his deanship, Beasley assisted foreign schools of public health (e.g., Xi'an Jiaotong University) to establish their Master of Public Health (MPH) programs. In 2003, he traveled to China and Taiwan to help investigate the SARS epidemic.

== Early life and education ==
Beasley was born on April 29, 1936, in Glendale, California, to Robert Seth Beasley and Bernice Palmer Beasley. His grandfather and father were bankers, while his mother was a lecturer. Both Palmer Beasley and his younger brother, Bruce Miller Beasley, attended public schools. Bruce Beasley is now an abstract expressionistsculptor who lives and works in Oakland, California.

Palmer Beasley received his Bachelor of Arts (BA) degree in philosophy, with a concentration in causation from Dartmouth College in 1958. He studied medicine at Harvard Medical School, where he was a student of Maxwell Finland and graduated in 1962. Upon graduating from medical school, he interned at King County Hospital in Seattle. From 1963 to 1965 he worked in the Epidemic Intelligence Service (EIS) in Atlanta. Beasley returned to Seattle in 1965 to start his residency at the University of Washington Hospital and in 1967 became a senior fellow in preventive medicine at the University of Washington School of Medicine.

== Career ==
=== Academia ===
From 1969 to 1986, Beasley was an assistant professor, then associate professor, then full Professor of Preventive Medicine (adjunct with Internal Medicine) in the Department of Epidemiology, at the University of Washington School of Public Health and Community Medicine. In 1979 he became Director of the American University Medical Center (AUMC) in Taipei, Taiwan. From 1986 to 1987, Beasley served as Professor of Medicine and Head of the Division of AIDS and Chronic Viral Infections at the University of California, San Francisco (UCSF). He assumed the position of Dean at the University of Texas Health Science Center at Houston (UTHealth) School of Public Health (UTSPH) in 1987, and remained dean until 2004. In 2005, he stepped down from the Deanship and had been an Ashbel Smith Professor, Director of the Center for International Training and Research (CITAR) and Dean Emeritus at the UTHealth School of Public Health until his death on August 25, 2012. Currently, CITAR attracts international students from Asia—primarily Vietnam, Thailand, China—as well as Africa to attend courses and seminars and conduct research in HIV/AIDS and cancers caused by infectious agents.

=== Research on hepatitis B ===
Beasley's research on hepatitis B spanned 1972 to 1986 in Taiwan. Before beginning his research on hepatitis B, Beasley worked on rubella in Taiwan during the late 1960s and early 1970s with Thomas Grayston, who was the first dean and founder of the University of Washington School of Public Health and later became the vice president of the University of Washington (UW). While working on a project on the efficacy of the rubella vaccine, Beasley became interested in hepatitis as "the infectious disease problem least understood and seemingly most important among those that remained unconquered after polio, smallpox, and measles had been brought under control".

In 1964, Baruch Samuel Blumberg discovered a surface antigen for hepatitis B in the blood of an Australian aborigine and, together with his team, developed a screening test. In 1974 Blumberg was awarded a Nobel Prize for this discovery. The Abbott Laboratories then developed a more sensitive and specific radioimmunoassay technique to detect the surface antigen of hepatitis B.

Beasley was excited that this technique would bring a new tool for his epidemiological study on hepatitis B. At that time, hepatitis B was known to be transmitted only from blood (i.e., transfusions, injections, blood products or inadvertent needle sticks). However, an important question occurred to him: "How was the virus transferred prior to the advent of modern technology?"

"Since transfusions are relatively recent in human history, how was this agent transmitted in nature before that?" he asked. Beasley says he "got a lot of puzzled looks" but no answers. "I suggested we ought to look to see if it isn't transmitted from mothers to babies, since that's the commonest way in nature that blood is shared between people. With that hypothesis I went to Taiwan and, with the Abbott Laboratories test, began screening and detecting carrier pregnant women in the obstetric clinics at the hospitals in Taipei. After some months of doing this, we had determined that almost 20% of the mothers in Taiwan were hepatitis B carriers, which is a phenomenally high rate." That figure contrasts sharply to a rate of less than 1% in the U.S. "About 40% of the babies of those carrier-mothers became infected," said Beasley.

Beasley then showed that the "E" antigen is a good predictor for vertical transmission from mother-to-infant. This observation led to new clinical trials on the hypothesis of whether the hepatitis B immune globulin (HBIG) protects newborns from being vertically transmitted from their mothers. Beasley and his team reported that babies receiving HBIG within a few hours of birth were protected whereas there was no protection for those who received HBIG after 24 hours. HBIG was then refined for administration to all newborns within minutes after birth. The results were astounding as the incidence of infection was reduced by approximately 75%.

At the same time, Beasley tried to test his hypothesis that hepatitis B causes liver cancer. However, he "ran into enormous skepticism by almost everybody" and "people were saying I was crazy." The notion at that time was that the cause of liver cancer was already known to be aflatoxins. With the start of the "war on cancer", beginning in 1975, the major focus in cancer research was on environmental factors.

Nonetheless, Beasley pursued his controversial hypothesis by designing one of the first large cohort studies to test the link between hepatitis B and liver cancer. With his co-investigator, Lu-Yu Hwang, and the Taiwan team of investigators, he conducted a study of over 22,000 government workers starting in 1974 and followed them up to the present. That long-term study found that the risk of liver cancer was 60 times higher in chronic HBV-infected persons than non-HBV carriers, and that the lifetime risk of dying from liver cancer was 40% in infected men and 15% in infected women. Noted that the association between liver cancer and HBV carriers was stronger than the association between lung cancer and smoking (i.e., 20–25 times). "It's one of the highest relative risks that anyone has ever seen," said Beasley. However, skepticism remained "because many people feel that establishing causation requires elucidating a plausible mechanism by which the effect occurs," he recalled.

In 1984, a vaccine program was launched in Taiwan and, in 1997, Taiwan reported a significant drop in liver cancer rates in children under 15 years of age after the adoption of a national universal newborn vaccination program. Following the recommendation of the World Health Organization in 1992, HBV vaccine has been used globally and was, at the time, the only immunization available to prevent a major human cancer. By the end of July 2011, 179 countries worldwide used hepatitis B vaccine as part of their national vaccination programs.

Beasley's work, and subsequent investigations by other researchers, has proved that there is a causal relationship between hepatitis and liver cancer. In 2005, HBV was officially recognized as one of 58 known agents that cause human cancer.

"Dr. Beasley has saved countless lives from cirrhosis and liver cancer through his work on the epidemiology and prevention of hepatitis B," according to Herbert L. DuPont, Director of the Center for Infectious Diseases at UTSPH. "He is a giant in the field of infectious diseases.".

Samuel Katz, Chairman Emeritus of the Department of Pediatrics at the Duke Children's Hospital and Health Center, Duke University Health System, has said, "Palmer's abundant achievements are highlighted most by his 14 years in Taiwan, where he was responsible for a succession of investigations—clinical, epidemiological and laboratory—which led to a full understanding of the spectrum of hepatitis B virus infection. These studies elucidated its virology, immunology, transmission and clinical manifestations, including its causal link to chronic hepatitis, cirrhosis and hepatocellular carcinoma." Beasley "demonstrated the efficacy of hepatitis B immune globulin in blocking infection, especially maternal-infant, and hepatitis B vaccine in its prevention. His longitudinal observations were the first to demonstrate that hepatocellular carcinoma was prevented in Taiwanese males by early life vaccination. Subsequent studies involved the then newly identified hepatitis C virus," Katz writes.

According to Cladd E. Stevens, his former student at the University of Washington who worked with Beasley in Taiwanese studies, "Dr. Beasley's work has lead to [sic] the thorough understanding and effective prevention of HBV infection and its long-term consequences on a global scale, making hepatocellular carcinoma and cirrhosis of the liver—one of the primary causes of death for much of the developing world of Asia, Africa and the Middle East—a thing of the past for current and future generations."

At the ceremony at which Beasley was given the 2010 Hepatitis B Foundation's Distinguished Scientist Award, Baruch Samuel Blumberg said "There are at least a million people alive today who would not be if it were not for Dr. Beasley's research.". On that occasion, Roberta T. Ness, Dean of UTSPH, said in The Medical News, "Dr. Beasley's contributions to understanding the link between hepatitis B and liver cancer have saved thousands of lives. His work not only transformed our understanding of the cause of liver cancer, but then spearheaded the solution through vaccination.".

=== Public health education ===
Beasley represented UTSPH to the Association of Schools of Public Health (ASPH) for almost 20 years. During those years he visited most of the now 38 schools of public health in the US, represented ASPH as a counselor/board member on the Council on Education for Public Health (CEPH), chaired several of the key committees of ASPH including the Education Committee, and the International Health Committee. He also served on the ASPH's executive committee as Treasurer, Vice President, and later President. As President he led efforts to strengthen the accreditation criteria and procedures used by CEPH, increase practical as part of MPH level education, establish credentialing for public health professionals, increase funding for the National Institutes of Health (NIH) and Centers for Disease Control and Prevention (CDC), reform the CDC to include better funding for extramural investigators, and build closer ties with foreign schools of public health. He visited schools of public health in many countries and as President of the ASPH he initiated an effort to have the schools cooperate to encourage public health education in India through the establishment of national schools of public health. He has also served as internal advisor to several established foreign schools of public health (e.g. London School of Hygiene & Tropical Medicine, National Taiwan University School of Public Health), and schools in evolution (e.g. Kyoto University). In his roles on CEPH and ASPH, he has reviewed the accreditation documents of every school of public health in the United States.

In 2005 the ASPH gave greater emphasis to international health when it created a new cross-divisional Global Health Program with funding from an FIC Framework grant jointly to UT and Baylor College of Medicine. This program has stimulated increasing numbers of students and faculty to learn about global health issues and seek experiences in developing countries.

After stepping down from the Deanship in 2005, Beasley devoted most of his time to global health research and training. In 2004, he created CITAR, under the sponsorship of the John E. Fogarty International Center, NIH to provide a training focus for foreign students seeking graduate-level proficiency related to HIV research with its initial focus on Vietnam. In 2007, he began a program of summer research internships for American students in international settings.

== Awards ==
During his career, Beasley received a number of international awards and prizes, including the King Faisal International Prize in Medicine in 1985, the Charles S. Mott Prize in Medicine in 1987, the Prince Mahidol Award in Medicine in 1999, the Taiwan National Health Medal 1st Order in 2000, the Hepatitis B Foundation's Distinguished Scientist Award in 2010, and recently the 2011 Maxwell Finland Award from the National Foundation for Infectious Diseases.

== Personal life ==
Beasley was married to Lu-Yu Hwang, who is also a world-renowned expert in HIV and HBV and who is a professor of epidemiology at the UTSPH. He has two children from a previous marriage and one child with Hwang. Beasley died at his home in Houston, Texas, on August 25, 2012, after a long battle with pancreatic cancer.

In his obituary in The New York Times on August 27, 2012, DuPont commented on Beasley's pioneer work in Taiwan, saying, "It's almost like an Albert Schweitzer trying to figure out Africa. It's a very unusual thing in medicine to see a senior person like Palmer Beasley living and fighting those wars himself."

The Houston Chronicle on August 27, 2012, ran the title "Dr. Palmer Beasley was instrumental in linking liver cancer, hepatitis B". The article quoted part of an interview in which he said, "I decided what we now call hepatitis B looked like the most poorly understood and least-controlled infectious disease problem in the world, and, therefore, the most important frontier."

The Liberty Times, a daily newspaper in Taiwan, on August 29, 2012, ran an article with a title "Those Taiwanese born after 1984, please say Thank You to Dr. Beasley".

== Publications ==
Beasley was the Chair of the Committee on the Prevention and Control of Viral Hepatitis Infections Board on Population Health and Public Health Practice at the Institute of Medicine of the National Academy of Sciences for the book titled "Hepatitis and Liver Cancer: A National Strategy for Prevention and Control of Hepatitis B and C", edited by Heather M. Colvin and Abigail E. Mitchell and published in 2009.

== See also ==
- Infectious causes of cancer
