= Herbert L. DuPont =

Herbert "Bert" Lancashire DuPont (born November 12, 1938, in Toledo, Ohio) is an American physician, medical school professor, and medical researcher, specializing in infectious diseases.

== Education and career ==
DuPont graduated in 1961 from Ohio Wesleyan University with a bachelor's degree and in 1965 from the Emory University School of Medicine with an M.D. At the University of Minnesota Hospitals in Minneapolis, he did his medical internship from 1965 to 1966 and his medical residency from 1966 to 1967. During his medical residency he was supervised by Dr. Wesley W. Spink (1904–1988) and became interested in infectious diseases.

From 1967 to 1969, DuPont held a fellowship at the University of Maryland School of Medicine (UMSOM) in Baltimore. There, he also did his military service as Epidemic Intelligence Officer of the Centers for Disease Control (CDC). At UMSOM, he became 1970 an assistant professor in 1972 and an associate professor. In 1973, he became a professor of medicine at the University of Texas Medical School at Houston (now called the McGovern Medical School, part of the University of Texas Health Science Center at Houston), as well as the first director of a newly established department of infectious diseases and medical microbiology. At the McGovern Medical School, he is the director of the Center for Infectious Diseases and since 1988 holds the Mary W. Kelsey Distinguished Chair in the Medical Sciences. Since 1977 he is a professor at Baylor College of Medicine in Houston. Since 1995 he has held a variety of appointments at Baylor St. Luke's Medical Center.

DuPont's research is particularly concerned with diarrheal diseases. In 1971 he was one of the researchers who described the biological properties of the Norwalk virus (later classified as one of the human noroviruses), and in a much-cited 1971 paper in the New England Journal of Medicine, he described the pathogenesis of diarrhea by Escherichia coli. His research also deals with other diarrheal agents such as Shigella, rotaviruses, Salmonella serotype Typhi bacteria, Cryptosporidium parvum, and Giardia. He and his colleagues demonstrated the effectiveness of rifaximin against travelers' diarrhea. In field studies in Mexico, he showed that tap water with viral pathogens, including rotaviruses, was a major source of infection with viral diarrhea.

He is the author or co-author of 17 books and over 500 articles. In 1990 he was the president of the Infectious Diseases Society of America (IDSA). He received in 2007 from the National Foundation for Infectious Diseases the Maxwell Finland Award and in 2010 from the IDSA the Alexander Fleming Award for lifetime achievement.

== Family ==
His older brother Robert DuPont is a psychiatrist who in the 1970s was the director of the National Institute on Drug Abuse.

Herbert DuPont and his wife, Margaret Wright DuPont, are both graduates of Ohio Wesleyan University's class of 1961. She has a master's degree in psychology from the Ohio State University.

They established the Herbert L. and Margaret Wright DuPont Endowed Professorship at Ohio Wesleyan University.

== Selected publications ==
- DuPont, Herbert L.; DuPont, Margaret W. (1981). Travel with Health. Appleton-Century-Crofts. ISBN 9780838590096.
- DuPont, Herbert L., ed. (6 December 2012). Use of Quinolones in Travel Medicine: Second Conference on International Travel Medicine Proceedings of the Ciprofloxacin Satellite Symposium "Use of Quinolones in Travel Medicine". Springer. ISBN 9783642770777.
- DuPont, H. L. (1982). Houston Day Care Center Study. Clinical and Epidemiological Studies Branch, MIDP, NIAID.
- DuPont, Herbert L.; Steffen, Robert (2001). Textbook of Travel Medicine and Health. B.C. Decker. ISBN 9781550091373.
- Ericsson, Charles D.; Dupont, Herbert L.; Steffen, Robert (June 2007). Travelers' Diarrhea (2nd ed.). ISBN 9781550093711. (1st edition, 2003)
- Steffen, Robert; DuPont, Herbert L.; Wilder-Smith, Annelies (2007). Manual of Travel Medicine and Health (3rd ed.). PMPH-USA. ISBN 9781550093698. (1st edition, 1999; 2nd edition, 2003)
- DuPont, Herbert L.; Pickering, Larry K. (6 December 2012). Infections of the Gastrointestinal Tract: Microbiology, Pathophysiology, and Clinical Features. Springer. ISBN 9781468436952.
- Humes, H. David; DuPont, Herbert L.; Gardner, Laurence B., eds. (2000). Kelley's Textbook of Internal Medicine (4th ed.). Lippincott Williams & Wilkins. ISBN 9781469874296. (1st edition, 1989)
