= Gordon Covell =

Physician and major general

Sir Gordon Covell
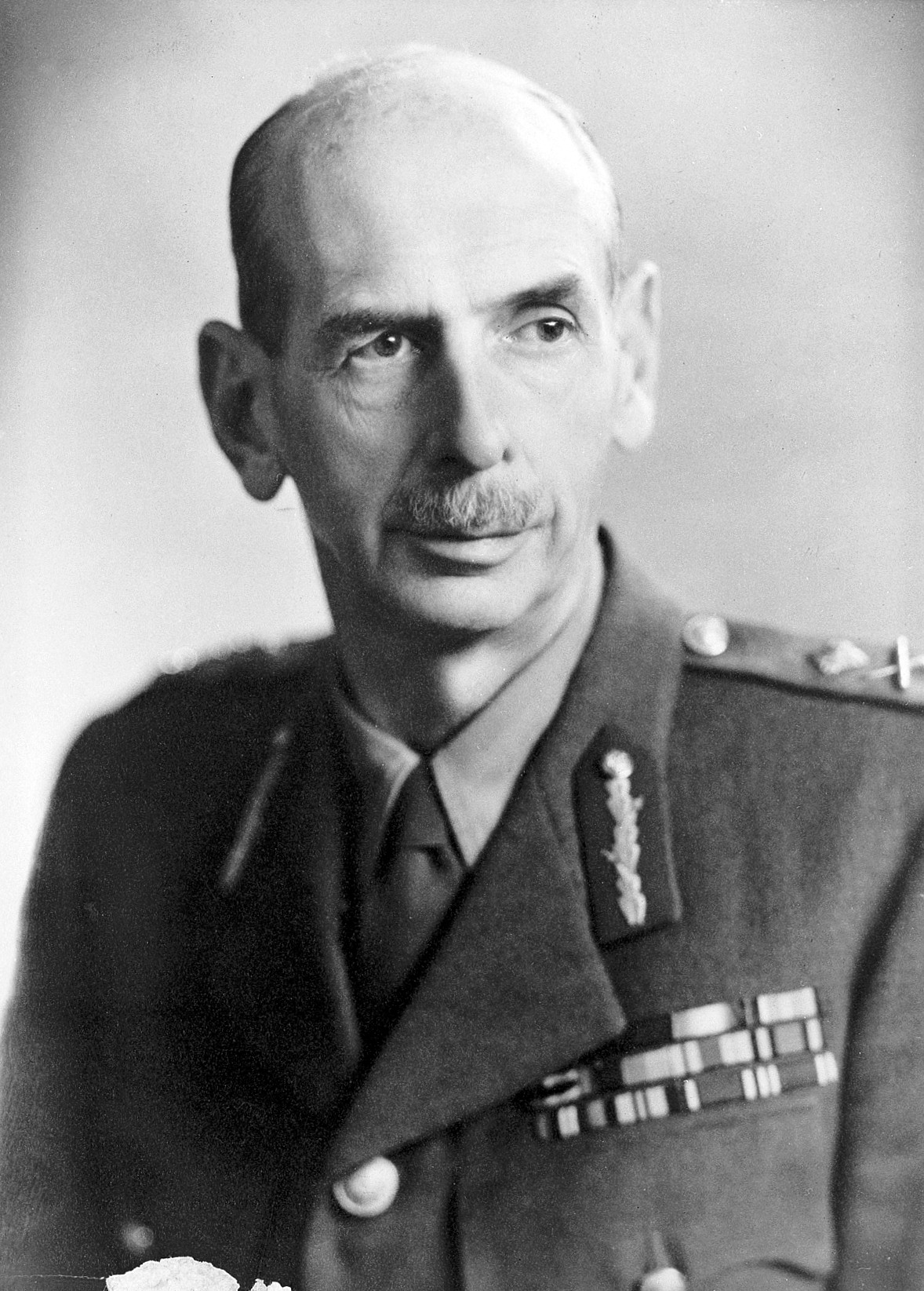
- Born: 20 October 1887
- Died: 4 October 1975 (aged 87)
- Awards: Darling Medal, Manson Medal, Walter Reed Medal

Major-General Sir Gordon Covell (20 October 1887 – 4 October 1975) was a physician and Indian Medical Service officer. He specialized in malaria disease control and eradication efforts and was a member of the expert committee on malaria set up by the WHO from 1948 to 1958, serving as its secretary. He was also an advisor to the British Ministry of Health and the Director of the Malaria Laboratory at Horton Hospital.

== Education ==
Covell studied at King's School, Canterbury, and graduated in medicine (MBBS) from Guy's Hospital in 1913 after which he was posted on war duty in East African campaign (World War I). He qualified for the Indian Medical Service in 1914. After serving in World War I, he passed the DTM&H with distinction and received Doctor of Medicine in 1923.

== Career ==
Covell served as a doctor in the Indian Medical Service from 1914 until Indian independence, when he headed the Central Malaria Bureau and the Director of the Malaria Institute of India in New Delhi (1936-1947). Early in his career in India, he was posted in the medical research department and posted in Central Malaria Bureau at Kasauli (later Central Research Institute, Kasauli), where he worked under Rickard Christophers and John Alexander Sinton, both accomplished Malariologists. In 1928, he co-authored a book on conducting surveys for malaria, published by the Indian government under the British Raj. He was the first Assistant Director for the newly created Malaria Survey of India created in 1927 and subsequently became its Director succeeding the founding director, John Alexander Sinton. During his tenure in India, he supervised some of the first of systematic epidemiological surveys of Malaria in several urban and rural areas in different parts of the country including relatively remote areas in Wayanad district, Andaman and Nicobar Islands, coastal regions of Odisha, northern parts of Sindh, urban locations in Mumbai, Kolkata and Delhi.

In 1927, he published possibly the first detailed account of the distribution of all 37 species of Anopheles mosquitoes (then known) from Indian and Ceylon. In a subsequent substantive account he published all known details of 137 species of Anopheles then known throughout the world with notes on their distribution, breeding and behaviour of all these.

He was particularly identified with successful malaria control programs in Bombay and Delhi, with his Delhi efforts being among the first to use large-scale insecticide spraying specifically targeting the adult stage of the vector. Later on, these initial efforts using Pyrethroid sprays would be replaced with DDT in many programs across the world. He was a proponent for a careful study of entomology, Anopheles species distribution and biting behaviour of the mosquito vector in determining success of disease control efforts and urged for looking beyond use of DDT and insecticides only in malaria eradication. He was involved in advising WHO on the therapeutics for malaria as well as research approaches to study efficacy of anti-malaria drugs.

After his retirement from India, he succeeded Sinton as the Director of the Malaria Research Laboratory at Epsom, continuing his work on chemotherapy and chemoprophylaxis for Malaria, as well as establishing pre-erythrocytic phases in all four human malarias. In 1952, he was invited by the then imperial government Ethiopia to study the malaria situation in southern part of the country around Lake Tana. He planned studies and collected baseline malaria on distribution of malaria prevalence, spleen rates and dominant vectors in Gondar, Jimma, Awash River valley and the Kobbo Chercher plain. This was amongst the first few systematic epidemiological investigations of malaria at different parts of the country, laying the foundations for a nationwide malaria control efforts.

On May 6, 1953, he delivered the Cutter talk on preventive medicine at the Harvard school of public health.

In 1961, he was in Pakistan to help with malaria disease control and eradication efforts by establishing training centres there and also frequently visited Delhi to observe the National Malaria Eradication Program that he described as "...something of a gigantic program in operation now in India". Due to the relatively later introduction of spraying for mosquitoes on a national scale in Pakistan, he advocated for prolongation of nationwide spraying efforts in India due to the possibility of transmission across the border areas. He noted the relatively better-off quality and systematic nature of training efforts for malaria eradication organised by the Malaria Institute of India and tried to organise training for senior leadership of the disease control efforts in Bangladesh and Pakistan, but this did not occur due to political reasons

He also worked on Rabies and studied endemic typhus in the Himalayan foothills. He fell seriously ill with typhus while studying it. He was a member of the Royal Society of Tropical Medicine and Hygiene and was its Vice-President. He co-edited a volume on medical research for the History of the Second World War series, Britain's official history of the Second World War.

== Personal life ==
He was married to Oona McLeod, daughter of Colonel Kenneth McLeod of the Indian Medical Services, who was possibly the first to describe Epidemic dropsy. They had three children, two of whom trained as doctors. He was known to enjoy classical music and had an interest in birds. In a letter to his friend P.G. Shute in late life, he wrote a poem about his health.

== Awards ==
He was awarded the Darling Medal by the World Health Organization in 1951 instituted in the memory of Samuel Taylor Darling. The American Society of Tropical Medicine and Hygiene awarded the Walter Reed Medal to him on November 4, 1960 in absentia. He was awarded the Manson Medal in 1971.

== Works ==
- Malaria Control by Anti-mosquito Measures, 1941
- How to Do a Malaria Survey, 1928
- Medical Research (History of the Second World War series, co-edited with F. H. K. Green), 1953
