= Swellengrebel =

Swellengrebel is a Dutch surname. Notable people with the surname include:

- Hendrik Swellengrebel (1700–1760), Dutch colonial governor
- Nicolaas Swellengrebel (1885–1970), Dutch epidemiologist, parasitologist, and pathologist
