= Thomas Huckle Weller =

American virologist

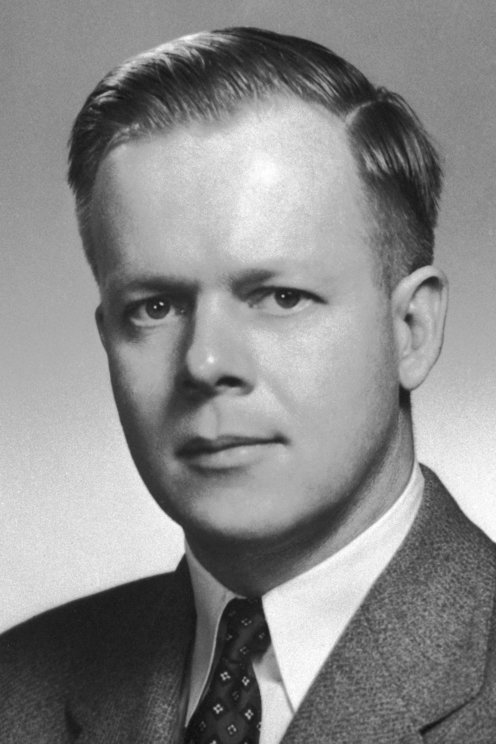
- Nobel Prize portrait, 1954
- Born: June 15, 1915; Ann Arbor, Michigan
- Died: August 23, 2008 (aged 93); Needham, Massachusetts
- Education: University of Michigan, Harvard Medical School
- Known for: poliomyelitis viruses
- Awards: E. Mead Johnson Award (1953); Nobel Prize in Physiology or Medicine (1954); Walter Reed Medal (1996)
- Scientific career
- Fields: virology

Thomas Huckle Weller (June 15, 1915 – August 23, 2008) was an American virologist. He, John Franklin Enders and Frederick Chapman Robbins were awarded a Nobel Prize in Physiology or Medicine in 1954 for showing how to cultivate poliomyelitis viruses in a test tube, using a combination of human embryonic skin and muscle tissue.

== Biography ==
Weller was born and grew up in Ann Arbor, Michigan, where he graduated from Ann Arbor High School. He then went to the University of Michigan, where his father Carl Vernon Weller was a professor in the Department of Pathology. At Michigan, he studied medical zoology and received a B.S. and an M.S., with his masters thesis on fish parasites.

In 1936, Weller entered Harvard Medical School, and in 1939 began working under John Franklin Enders, with whom he would later (along with Frederick Chapman Robbins) share the Nobel Prize. It was Enders who got Weller involved in researching viruses and tissue-culture techniques for determining infectious disease causes. Weller received his MD in 1940, and went to work at Children's Hospital in Boston.

In 1942, during World War II, he entered the Army Medical Corps and was stationed at the Antilles Medical Laboratory in Puerto Rico, earning the rank of Major and heading the facility's Departments of Bacteriology, Virology and Parasitology. After the War, he returned to Children's Hospital in Boston, and it was there in 1947, that he rejoined Enders in the newly created Research Division of Infectious Diseases. After several leading positions, in July 1954, he was appointed head of the Tropical Public Health Department at the Harvard School of Public Health. Weller also served from 1953 to 1959 as director of the Commission on Parasitic Diseases of the American Armed Forces Epidemiological Board.

In addition to his work on polio, Weller also contributed to treating schistosomiasis, and Coxsackie viruses. He was also the first to isolate the virus responsible for chickenpox.

== Awards ==
In 1954, Weller was awarded the George Ledlie prize in recognition of his research on rubella, polio and cytomegalovirus(CMV) viruses.

He was awarded the Nobel Prize in Physiology or Medicine in 1954 for his research on polio.

In 1996 he was awarded the Walter Reed Medal from the American Society of Tropical Medicine and Hygiene.

== Personal life ==
In 1945, Weller married Kathleen Fahey, who died in 2011 aged 95. They had two sons and two daughters.

== Citations ==
- Zetterström, Rolf; Lagercrantz, Hugo (2006), "J.F. Enders (1897-1985), T.H. Weller (1915-) and F.C. Robbins (1916-2003): a simplified method for the multiplication of poliomyelitis virus. Dreams of eradicating a terrifying disease.", Acta Paediatr., vol. 95, no. 9 (published September 2006), pp. 1026–8, doi:10.1080/08035250600900073, PMID 16938745, S2CID 30811791
- Ligon, B Lee (2002), "Thomas Huckle Weller MD: Nobel Laureate and research pioneer in poliomyelitis, varicella-zoster virus, cytomegalovirus, rubella, and other infectious diseases.", Seminars in Pediatric Infectious Diseases, vol. 13, no. 1 (published January 2002), pp. 55–63, doi:10.1053/spid.2002.31314, PMID 12118846
- Kyle, R A; Shampo, M A (1997), "Thomas Huckle Weller and the successful culture of poliovirus.", Mayo Clin. Proc., vol. 72, no. 5 (published May 1997), p. 422, doi:10.1016/s0025-6196(11)64860-x, PMID 9146683
- Bendiner, E (1982), "Enders, Weller, and Robbins: the trio that 'fished in troubled waters'.", Hosp. Pract. (Off. Ed.), vol. 17, no. 1 (published January 1982), pp. 163, 169, 174–5 passim, doi:10.1080/21548331.1982.11698030, PMID 6295913
- Sulek, K (1968), "[Nobel prizes for John F. Enders, Frederick Ch, Robbins and Thomas H. Weller in 1954 for discovery of the possibility of growing poliomyelitis virus on various tissue media]", Wiad. Lek., vol. 21, no. 24 (published December 15, 1968), pp. 2301–3, PMID 4303387
