= Lewis Hackett =

American physician

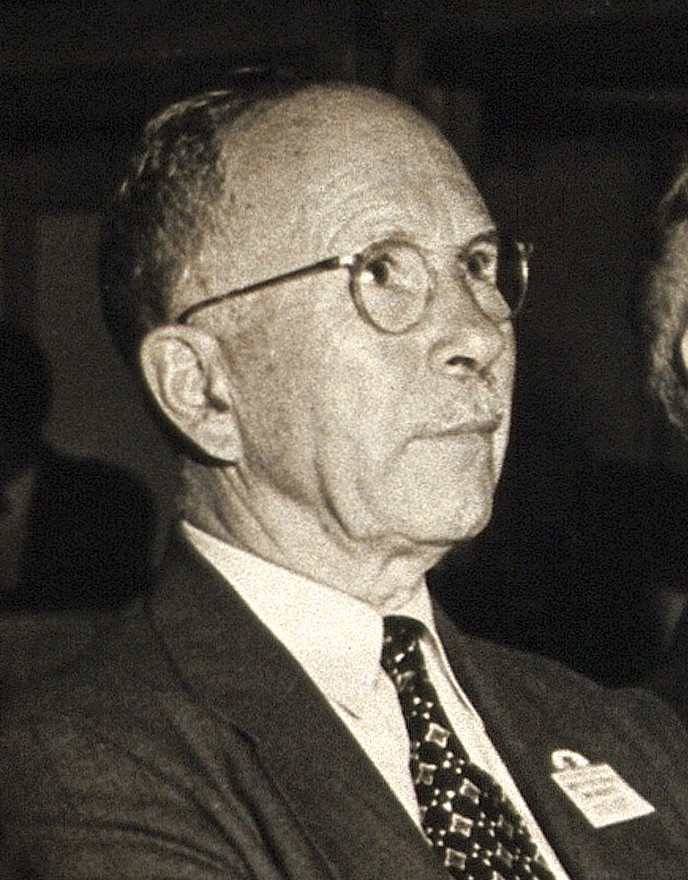
Lewis Hackett (1948)

Lewis Wendell Hackett (14 December 1884 - Washington, 28 April 1962) was an American physician who worked in Italy, Albania and South America to combat malaria.

== Life ==
Hackett graduated from Harvard Medical School in 1913. The following year he became part of the International Health Division of the Rockefeller Foundation, whose task was the eradication of certain diseases of particular social importance in different parts of the world. From 1914 to 1924 he worked in Central America. In 1924 he was transferred to Italy.

Hackett had the opportunity to collaborate with the Italian doctor Alberto Missiroli, at the Laboratory of Public Health of Rome, who was interested in the implementation of preventive measures for malaria control based on the control of mosquitoes. Together with Bartholomew Gosio, he founded the School of Malariology in Nettuno. He began to experiment with DDT against Anopheles mosquitoes, vectors of the disease.

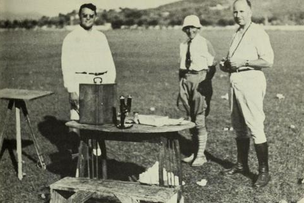
Engineers Frederick W. Knipe, Betty Lindsay and Hackett in Albania

In 1925, Hackett and Missiroli, with funding from the Rockefeller Foundation, started the work which led to the creation of the Istituto Superiore di Sanità. Hackett and Frederick W. Knipe led work in Albania to control Malaria where the British engineer, Betty Lindsay, was employed until 1939.

In 1940, with the outbreak of World War II, Hackett left Italy to go to South America where he remained until 1949. Overall, Hackett worked in seventeen countries. He was the first editor of the American Journal of Tropical Medicine and Hygiene when it was created in 1952 and president of the American Society of Tropical Medicine and Hygiene (ASTMH) in 1959. In 1953 he was awarded the Walter Reed Medal from the American Society of Tropical Medicine and Hygiene.

== Publications ==
- LW Hackett, Malaria in Europe. An ecological study, London: Oxford University Press, 1937.
- Lewis W. Hackett, Alberto Missiroli, The varieties of Anopheles maculipennis and their relation to the distribution of malaria in Europe, Journal of malariology 14:45-109, 1935.
