= Fred Soper =

American epidemiologist (1893–1977)

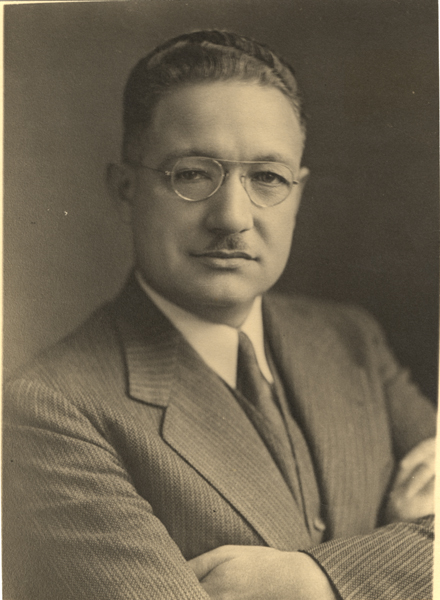
Fred Soper (in 1928)

Frederick Lowe Soper (December 13, 1893 – February 9, 1977) was an American epidemiologist.

Born in Hutchinson, Kansas, his first two degrees were received from the University of Kansas, an AB in 1914 and his Masters of Science in 1916. Dr Soper was the first Director of the SEATO Cholera Research Center (CRL), now known as icddr,b (International Centre for Diarrhoeal Disease Research, Bangladesh), serving from 1960 to 1962. He received a doctorate from the Johns Hopkins School of Public Health. Soper spent the better part of his career working for the Rockefeller Foundation. Fred Soper's best-known project was known as the Global Malaria Eradication Program. In 1972 he was awarded the Walter Reed Medal from the American Society of Tropical Medicine and Hygiene.

Fred Soper was featured by Canadian journalist Malcolm Gladwell in a July 2, 2001 New Yorker article titled "The Mosquito Killer."

He died in Wichita, Kansas at the age of 83.

== Bibliography ==
- Ventures in world health: the memoirs of Fred Lowe Soper. Washington, Pan American Health Organization, Pan American Sanitary Bureau, Regional Office of the World Health Organization, 1977
- J. Austin Kerr (ed.): Building the health bridge: selections from the work of Fred L. Soper. Bloomington, Indiana University Press, 1970
- Fred. L. Soper, D. Bruce Wilson, Servulo Lima and Waldemar Sá Antunes: The organization of permanent nationwide anti-Aedes Aegypti measures in Brazil. New York, The Rockefeller Foundation, 1943
- Fred L. Soper and D. Bruce Wilson: Anopheles gambiae in Brazil : 1930 to 1940. New York, Rockefeller Foundation, 1943
