= Phillip Russell (general) =

US general (1932–2021)

Phillip Russell (1932–2021) was an American arbovirologist, former commander of United States Army Medical Research and Development Command, and former president American Society of Tropical Medicine and Hygiene. In 1999 he was awarded the Walter Reed Medal from the American Society of Tropical Medicine and Hygiene.
