= Letitia Campfield =

Letitia Campfield was one of the first Black people to be admitted to the Nurses Training Program at Boston City Hospital School of Nursing in April 1929. Campfield and Frances W. Harris, the other Black woman who was admitted as a trainee at Boston City Hospital, began their training in September 1929.

== Early life ==
Campfield was from Cambridge, Massachusetts.

== Legacy ==
In 2023, she was recognized as one of "Boston’s most admired, beloved, and successful Black Women leaders" by the Black Women Lead project.
