= William A. Petri =

American physician and scientist

- Born: December 25, 1955
- Education: Case Western Reserve University; University of Virginia
- Scientific career
- Fields: Microbiology; Infectious Diseases
- Workplaces: University of Virginia

William A. Petri is a physician-scientist at the University of Virginia School of Medicine and the Wade Hampton Frost Professor of Epidemiology. He is a member of the Association of American Physicians and the American Society for Clinical Investigation, both medical honor societies recognizing distinguished physicians. Petri is the past president of the American Society of Tropical Medicine and Hygiene and has been elected a fellow of the American Academy of Microbiology. He developed an FDA-approved test to detect amebiasis, and later, with significant funding from NIH, developed a vaccine program. He is the highest funded researcher in the School of Medicine. Under his leadership, the division's annual research funding has increased from 0.5 million to $19 million, making it the highest externally-funded program at the university.

== Career ==
Petri began his education studying chemistry at the University of Wisconsin-Madison. After three years, he was admitted to the University of Virginia, completing his M.D., and Ph.D. in 1982. He completed his residency in internal medicine at Case Western Reserve University, followed by a fellowship in infectious diseases at UVA. He became an assistant professor in 1988 upon the completion of his fellowship. He has chaired UVA's Division of Infectious Diseases and International Health since 2001.

In his laboratory, Petri studies enteric infections in the developing world, molecular parasitology, host defense and Clostridioides difficile, and human immune response to Entamoeba histolytica and strain-associated differences in E. histolytica virulence. He leads the Bill & Melinda Gates Foundation’s PROVIDE study in Bangladesh and India exploring new solutions for the problem of oral poliovirus and rotavirus vaccine failures in the developing world. He was a member of the NIAID Blue Ribbon Panel on Bioterrorism and its Implications for Biomedical Research in 2002.

In 2017, he was appointed chair of the World Health Organization’s Polio Research Committee.

He was an editor of Infection and Immunity from 1999-2009. Petri has authored more than 400 papers and books, and he is listed as an inventor on more than 20 patents.

== Awards and honors ==
His work earned the Oswald Avery Award of the Infectious Diseases Society of America and an Outstanding Faculty Award from the State Council of Higher Education for Virginia. He received the Squibb Award and has been honored with the Burroughs Wellcome New Investigator and Scholar in Molecular Parasitology and a Lucille P. Markey Scholar in Biomedical Research. He is a member of Alpha Omega Alpha.

His research has been heavily funded by the National Institutes of Health and the Bill and Melinda Gates Foundation. He is also the principal investigator of two NIH T32 training grants. He has led and competitively renewed the Infectious Diseases T32 training program since 1996, and founded, led and competitively renewed the Biodefense and Emerging Infections T32 since 2003. In 2008, Nature Magazine revealed that he was amongst the top 20 NIH-funded scientists in the US. He has continuously served on advisory committees for the NIH since 1993.

In 2017, he was named Virginia Outstanding Scientist of the year. In 2021 he received the Maxwell Finland Award.

In 2022, he received the Walter Reed Medal from The American Society of Tropical Medicine & Hygiene.

== Personal life ==
He has two sisters that are academic physicians at Johns Hopkins School of Medicine and Harvard Medical School, and a brother who is an assistant US attorney in Florida. He and his wife have five children.

== Highly cited publications ==
- The Genome Of The Protist Parasite Entamoeba histolytica. Loftus, B; Anderson, I; Davies, R et al. Nature 433: 865-868, 2005 doi:10.1038/nature03291
- Amebiasis. Haque, R; Huston, CD; Hughes, M; Petri WA Jr. New England Journal of Medicine 348: 1565-1573, 2003 doi:10.1056/NEJMra022710
- Isolation of the Galactose-Binding Lectin That Mediates the in vitro Adherence of Entamoeba histolytica. Petri, WA; Smith, RD; Schlesinger, PH et al. Journal of Clinical Investigation 80:1238-1244, 1987 doi:10.1172/JCI113198
- Cat-Scratch Disease, Bacillary Angiomatosis, and Other Infections due to Rochalimaea. Adal, KA; Cockerell, CJ; Petri, WA New England Journal of Medicine 330: 1509-1515, 1994 doi:10.1056/NEJM199405263302108
- Rat And Human Colonic Mucins Bind to and Inhibit Adherence Lectin of Entamoeba-histolytica. Chadee, K; Petri, Wa; Innes, Dj; et al. Journal of Clinical Investigation 80: 1245-1254, 1987 doi:10.1172/JCI113199
