= Anne A. Gershon =

American Pediatric Infectious Disease Researcher

- Education: Smith College (BsC); Cornell University (MD)
- Known for: Work on chickenpox
- Spouse: Michael D. Gershon
- Awards: Albert B. Sabin Gold Medal (2013); Maxwell Finland Award (2019)
- Scientific career
- Fields: Pediatric infectious disease
- Workplaces: Columbia University

Anne Gershon is an infectious disease researcher and professor of pediatrics at Columbia University. She is best known for her work on the varicella-zoster virus, the causative agent for chickenpox. In the 1970s, she ran clinical trials for the varicella vaccine which showed that the vaccine was safe for children with leukemia. She also developed the first sensitive test for chickenpox.

== Education ==
Gershon studied pre-medicine at Smith College and graduated in 1960. She completed her medical degree at Cornell Medical School and her residency at New York Hospital. While in New York, Gershon studied the herpes simplex virus in infants.

== Career ==
After Michiaki Takahasi developed a vaccine against variella in the late 1960s, Gershon organized the Varicella Vaccine Collaborative Study Group to study both the safety and efficacy of this vaccine. This group, funded by the NIH, showed that the varicella vaccine was safe even for children who were in remission from leukemia. In 1991, the group published "The Incidence of Zoster after Immunization with Live Attenuated Varicella Vaccine -- A Study in Children with Leukemia," in the New England Journal of Medicine. They showed that leukemic children who were vaccinated against varicella had lower rates of later varicella infection than children who were naturally infected.

In 2000, Gershon, along with Ann M. Arvin, published Varicella-zoster virus: virology and clinical management.

She has stated that her decision to study pediatrics was because it was "essentially the only field open to women at the time."

== Awards and leadership ==
In 1993, Gershon was awarded an honorary Doctorate of Science from Smith College.

From 2008-2009, Gershon was the president of the Infectious Diseases Society of America.

In 2013, Gershon was awarded the Albert B. Sabin Gold Medal in recognition of her research that led to public acceptance of the chickenpox vaccine.

In 2019, Gershon was awarded the Maxwell Finland Award for Scientific Research.

== Personal life ==
Anne Gershon is married to Michael D. Gershon. Her father was a doctor, and she has stated that she wanted to pursue a similar career. She has also cited her personal experiences with infectious diseases, including toxoplasmosis and mononucleosis, as her reason to study vaccinology.
