= Scott Weaver =

Scott Weaver may refer to:

- Scotty Joe Weaver (1986–2004), murder victim from Bay Minette, Alabama
- Scott C. Weaver, director of Galveston National Laboratory
- Scott Weaver (racing driver), American stock car racing driver
