= Scott Halstead =

American scientist and virologist

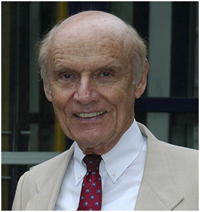
- Born: 1930
- Occupations: Physician-scientist, virologist and epidemiologist
- Known for: Research with mosquito-borne illnesses

Scott Halstead is an American physician-scientist, virologist and epidemiologist known for his work in the fields of tropical medicine and vaccine development. He is considered one of the world's foremost authorities on viruses transmitted by mosquitoes, including Dengue, Japanese encephalitis, chikungunya and Zika. He was one of the first researchers to identify the phenomenon known as antibody-dependent enhancement (ADE), where the antibodies generated from a first dengue infection can sometimes worsen the symptoms from a second infection.

A former president of the global health organization American Society of Tropical Medicine and Hygiene (ASTMH), he also co-founded the Children's Vaccine Initiative, and founded the Pediatric Dengue Vaccine Initiative. He has published hundreds of papers and book chapters about viruses and diseases.

== Early life and education ==
Scott Halstead was born in 1930 in Lucknow, India to Gordon P. and Helen Halstead, Methodist missionaries based in Lucknow. In 1936, they moved to White Plains, NY, where he attended White Plains High School.

He graduated from Yale University with a BA in sociology in 1951 and from Columbia University with an MD in 1955.

== Career ==
=== Early research ===
In 1957, Halstead was drafted by the U.S. Army Medical Corps. He was assigned to the Department of Virus and Rickettsial Diseases (DVRD) in Sagamihara, Japan, and began studying mosquito-borne viruses. He was then transferred to work as a virologist at the Department of Virus Diseases at the Walter Reed Army Institute of Research (WRAIR), in Washington, D.C.

=== Dengue research ===
From 1961 to 1965, Halstead served as the director of the United States Army's SEATO infectious disease laboratory in Bangkok, Thailand. During this time, he studied the dengue virus, and published research on the isolation and propagation of dengue virus in tissue culture; secondary infections in children; and dengue infection of infants born to dengue immune mothers.

In 1965 Halstead left Bangkok to join the Yale Arbovirus Research Unit, part of the Yale School of Public Health. In a memoir published in 2002, he wrote that he worked at the newly opened Department of Epidemiology and Public Health, where he also worked on his dengue data set at Yale and published white papers that consolidated his research.

In 1967 he presented the first paper describing severe dengue hemorrhagic fever as the result of a second infection by one of the other four types of dengue, a phenomenon now known as antibody-dependent enhancement (ADE). This discovery influenced the future development of the dengue vaccine candidates.

In 1968, Halstead retired from the Army. From 1968 to 1983, he served as the first chair of the Department of Tropical Medicine and Microbiology at the University of Hawaii School of Medicine, in Honolulu Hawaii.

=== Public health and vaccine development ===
In 1983, Halstead joined the Health Sciences Division of the Rockefeller Foundation in New York as associate director, eventually becoming the group's director.

During this period he helped found International Clinical Epidemiology Network (INCLEN), a global research and medical-education network designed to strengthen the research capacity of medical schools in the developing world.

In 1990, while with the Rockefeller Foundation, Halstead co-founded the Children's Vaccine Initiative, now the Global Alliance for Vaccines and Immunization (GAVI).

In 1991, Halstead was president of global health organization American Society of Tropical Medicine and Hygiene (ASTMH).

From 1995 to 1997, he was director of infectious disease research for the U.S. Navy, becoming chief scientist in 1997.

In 1999, he began working at the Uniformed Services University of the Health Sciences in Bethesda, Maryland, and remained a consultant with the U.S. Navy.

In 2003, he founded the Pediatric Dengue Vaccine Initiative (PDVI) at the International Vaccine Institute, with $55M from the Gates Foundation. PDVI was founded to promote and fund basic science and applied clinical research to accelerate the development of dengue vaccines. He served as director of research and development from 2003 to 2010.

=== Dengvaxia controversy ===
Halstead played an important role during 2015–19 as a consultant and later as a scientific critic of Sanofi Pasteur’s Dengvaxia, the first dengue vaccine to be licensed for widespread use in countries where dengue is prevalent. Based on his review and analysis of Sanofi's Phase 3 clinical trial data in 2016, he determined that the vaccine posed a substantial danger of contracting severe dengue to individuals who had no prior history of dengue infection. Dr. Halstead and colleague Dr. Phillip Russell then proposed that the vaccine only be used after antibody testing, to rule out prior dengue exposure and avoid vaccination of sero-negative individuals. Sanofi rebutted their analysis and sold Dengvaxia to the Philippines, where 700,000 school age children were vaccinated. An alarming rate of hospitalizations were found in vaccinated children following a dengue exposure.

After an analysis of Phase 3 clinical trial data, Sanofi scientists concluded that Halstead and Russell were correct and that Dengvaxia posed a significant risk for previously uninfected people. More cases were likely after vaccination due to a subsequent dengue infection.

That led to the vaccine being banned in the Philippines, and Sanofi and Filipino public health officials were accused of malfeasance in proceeding with an unproven vaccination program. In 2018, Halstead served as an expert witness, testifying in person at Philippines Senate hearings on what became known as the Dengvaxia controversy.

=== COVID-19 ===
During the global COVID-19 pandemic that started in 2019, Halstead began researching protecting at-risk groups via antibody-based strategies including convalescent plasma and monoclonal antibodies. He published papers about vaccine development and potential risks associated with ADE including vaccine hypersensitivity reactions, to assist with ongoing COVID-19 prevention.

== Awards and recognition ==
In 2017, Halstead received the Walter Reed Medal from ASTMH.

== See also ==
- Dengvaxia controversy
- Global Alliance for Vaccines and Immunization
