= Claire V. Broome =

American epidemiologist (born 1949)

Claire Veronica Broome

Personal details
- Born: August 24, 1949 (age 77) Tunbridge Wells, UK
- Spouse: John Head
- Education: Harvard University
- Profession: Epidemiologist and physician

Claire Veronica Broome (born August 24, 1949) is an American epidemiologist, specializing in public health surveillance and vaccine evaluation, who has contributed to the development and effective utilization of key vaccines against pathogens causing pneumonia and meningitis. She joined the Centers for Disease Control and served with the CDC for 28 years, eventually holding the positions of deputy director, acting CDC director (1998), and senior advisor for integrated heath information systems. In 1995 she was promoted to assistant surgeon general in the US Public Health Service.

== Early life ==
Claire Broome was born in Tunbridge Wells, England, on August 24, 1949, the daughter of Heather (Platt), a chemist and technical librarian, and Kenneth R. Broome, a civil engineer. The family emigrated to the United States in 1952. She earned a baccalaureate magna cum laude in biochemistry from Harvard University (Cambridge, MA) in 1970, and an MD from Harvard Medical School (Boston, MA) in 1975.

== Career ==
Following a residency in internal medicine at the University of California, San Francisco (1975–77), she joined the Centers for Disease Control (CDC) as an Epidemic Intelligence Service (EIS) officer (1977–79) and served with the CDC for 28 years, eventually holding the positions of deputy director (1994–99), acting CDC director (1998), and senior advisor for integrated heath information systems (2000–06). In 1995 she was promoted to assistant surgeon general in the US Public Health Service.

During this period, Dr. Broome served as a chairperson for the World Health Organization (WHO) Steering Committee for Encapsulated Bacteria, which was responsible for funding and implementing a research portfolio on vaccines needed to prevent bacterial meningitis and pneumonia in developing countries (part of the WHO Programme for Vaccine Development, a predecessor of the CVI and GAVI).

From 1999 to 2006, she led the development and implementation of the National Electronic Disease Surveillance System (NEDSS), a project to transform public health surveillance in the US by electronic transmission of public health relevant clinical lab test results to state public health departments. These systems use the same standards which have been endorsed for clinical Electronic Health records; the majority of states in the country are now implementing one or more NEDSS functions. She also served as CDC's participant in national public private consortia to accelerate standards based Electronic Health Records.

== Controversy ==
During Dr. Broome's tenure at the CDC, the United States Congress set aside $23 million for research into a complex illness called Chronic Fatigue Syndrome (CFS). The director of the Division responsible for CFS subsequently allocated approximately 40% of those funds to other research areas such as measles, poliomyelitis, and human papillomavirus, prompting a whistleblower report and investigation by the Office of the Inspector General of the Department of Health and Human Services. As a result of the audit, it was determined that the CDC had provided Congress with an inaccurate summary of its utilization of the $23 million in CFS funding, and the Agency committed to revisions to its training and accounting protocols.

== Key scientific contributions ==
At the CDC, Broome contributed to the understanding of several diseases of high public interest including Legionnaires' Disease, pneumococcal vaccine evaluation, meningococcal disease and Toxic Shock Syndrome. Notable accomplishments included development of a new method for observational measurement of the effectiveness of the pneumoccal polysaccharide vaccine (the "indirect cohort" or "Broome" method), which has been used since then to assess serotype specific effectiveness, duration of effectiveness, and effectiveness in groups with underlying disease; designed observational and field trials to evaluate vaccine performance, including sequential case control studies to define duration of meningococcal polysaccharide vaccine effectiveness in Burkina Faso; a cluster randomized trial of Group B meningococcal vaccine efficacy in Cuba; and Haemophilus influenzae type b conjugate vaccine impact on pneumonia in the Gambia; creation of funded population based active surveillance sites for 5 invasive bacterial pathogens (the forerunner of domestic Emerging Infections Programs); and demonstration that epidemic and sporadic listeriosis was a food-borne disease.

== Awards ==
Broome was elected to the Institute of Medicine in 1996 (now the National Academy of Medicine). Professional awards include the PHS Distinguished Service Award; the Surgeon General's Medallion; the Infectious Disease Society of America's Squibb Award for Excellence of Achievement in Infectious Diseases; the John Snow Award from the American Public Health Association, Epidemiology Section; 2020 Maxwell Finland Award for Scientific Achievement, National Foundation for Infectious Diseases; 2021 Schneerson-Robbins Prize, 15th Vaccine Congress; Charles Shepard Award 1986; Langmuir Award co-author 1981, 1983, 1988, 1989, 1993.
