= Clara Southmayd Ludlow =

American entomologist

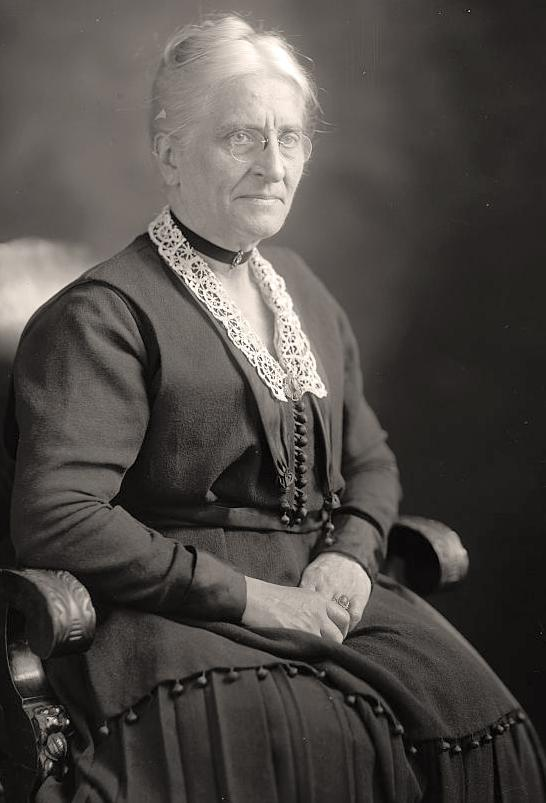
- Photographed ca. 1905–1924
- Born: 26 December 1852; Easton, Pennsylvania, U.S.
- Died: 28 September 1924 (aged 71); Washington, D.C., U.S.
- Education: B.S., M.A., Mississippi State University, Ph.D. George Washington University
- Years active: 1889–1924
- Known for: Scientist, Entomologist
- Parent(s): Jacob Rapalje Ludlow, Anna Mary Hunt

Clara Southmayd Ludlow (1852–1924) was an American entomologist, the first woman known to publish extensively on the taxonomy of mosquitoes and their occurrence in relation to the incidence of mosquito-borne diseases. She made important contributions to the field of medical entomology and served as head of the Department of Entomology at the Army Medical Museum from 1920 until her death.

== Early life ==
Clara Southmayd Ludlow was born on December 26, 1852, in Easton, Pennsylvania, the eldest child of Jacob Rapalje and Anna Mary (Hunt) Ludlow. During the American Civil War, her father served as Surgeon of the 1st Regiment, Pennsylvania Volunteers, United States Army, and the family briefly lived in Knoxville, Tennessee after the war.

Between 1877 and 1879, she completed a course of study at the New England Conservatory of Music in singing and piano, and soon after served as alumni president. In 1880 she was enumerated by the federal census at the Monticello Female Seminary near Alton, Illinois, her occupation listed as "Music [Teacher]." According to the 1924 Biographical Cyclopedia of American Women, "for many years she made music her profession, teaching and doing a certain amount of concert work." However, she reported experiencing familial strain and depression during that period that contributed to her change in profession.

== Education and career as a scientist ==
By 1897, she was a student at Mississippi Agricultural & Mechanical College (now Mississippi State University) in Starkville, Mississippi, which was otherwise an all-male institution. In 1898, she had her first formal exposure to entomology as a student working in the mosquito laboratory of Professor George W. Herrick during an epidemic of yellow fever. She graduated from Mississippi A&M in 1900 with the degree of Bachelor of Science in Agriculture. In 1901, she was awarded a Master of Arts degree in botany by Mississippi A&M. She made drawings of Viola species that were later obtained by Professor Edward Lee Greene of the University of Notre Dame.

After graduation in 1901 with her Masters of Arts degree, Ludlow traveled to Manila, Republic of the Philippines, to visit one of her two younger brothers, Henry Hunt, who was stationed there as an artillery officer in the U.S. Army. There she worked on disease-vectoring mosquitoes with the Army Surgeon General's Office, encouraged by Dr. William J. Calvert of the Manila Plague Laboratory. In October 1901, she returned to San Francisco with her brother, who had contracted an illness. She began to publish descriptions of the mosquitoes she had encountered in the Philippines in 1902 and continued to receive specimens from Army physicians stationed internationally who used special collecting kits to catch mosquitoes at the order of her later dissertation committee chair, Surgeon General George Miller Sternberg.

In 1904, she was a lecturer on mosquitoes and disease at the Army Medical Museum in Washington, D.C. By 1907, she was Demonstrator of Histology and Embryology at George Washington University in Washington, D.C., where she received her Doctor of Philosophy degree in preventive medicine in 1908. Her doctoral dissertation was entitled The Mosquitoes of the Philippine Islands: The Distribution of Certain Species and Their Occurrence in Relation to the Incidence of Certain Diseases. She remained on the faculty of George Washington University, where in 1909 she was Instructor of Histology and Embryology. In 1908 Ludlow was elected to the American Society of Tropical Medicine, the first woman and the first non-physician member of the society. During this time, between 1909 and 1910, she also attended medical school classes.

From 1916 until 1920 she was officially an anatomist at the Army Medical Museum, now the National Museum of Health and Medicine, on the Walter Reed Army Medical Center post in Washington, D.C. She was deeply involved in mosquito taxonomy, identification and public health efforts, including a project that resulted in the production of an educational film, Mosquito Eradication, in 1918. During 1920, she became the museum's Chief Entomologist, a position she held until her death.

== Death and interment ==
Ludlow died on September 28, 1924, from cancer in Washington, D.C. She was eulogized by Major General James F. Coupal. She is interred in Arlington National Cemetery, in Section 2, Grave No. 3843, beside her father. Her grave marker simply indicates her name and date of death, and that she was "daughter of Jacob".

== Commemoration ==
She was commemorated by contemporary entomologists in the specific epithets of the mosquitoes Uranotaenia clara Dyar & Shannon, 1925 and Uranotaenia ludlowae Dyar & Shannon, 1925, having formally described many more species herself during her life (72 species plus six genera).

In 2017, the American Society of Tropical Medicine and Hygiene began awarding a medal named after Dr. Ludlow, "a woman icon in tropical medicine" recognizing honorees of either gender for their "inspirational and pioneering spirit, whose work represents success despite obstacles and advances in tropical medicine."
