= National Emerging Infectious Diseases Laboratories =

Boston University facility

Coordinates: 42.336016°N 71.068593°W

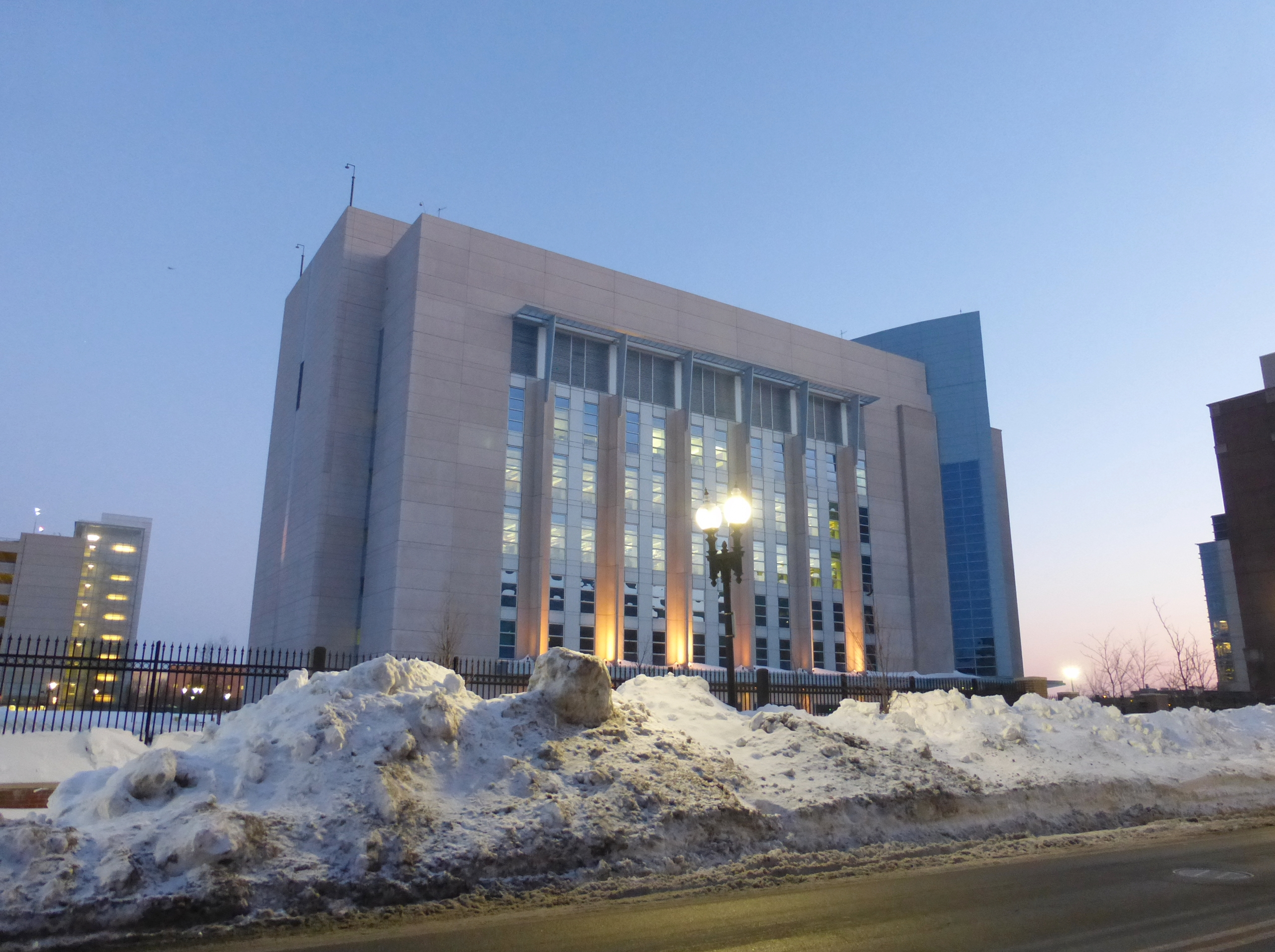
National Emerging Infectious Diseases Laboratories (NEIDL) building

The National Emerging Infectious Diseases Laboratories (NEIDL) is a biosciences facility of Boston University located in the clinical and biopharma hub of the South End neighborhood of Boston, Massachusetts.

The lab is part of a national network of secure facilities that study infectious diseases, whether naturally occurring or introduced through bioterrorism. NEIDL is one of only 13 operational or planned biosafety level 4 (BSL-4) laboratories in the United States.

NEIDL's current director is Robert Davey, PhD. Dr. Davey is a recognized virologist and expert in virus-host interactions. He also holds appointments as professor of virology, immunology, and microbiology at the Boston University’s Chobanian & Avedisian School of Medicine.

== History ==
On February 2, 2006, Boston Medical Center received regulatory approval from the federal government to fund construction of a National Biocontainment Laboratory at the Boston University Medical Center in the South End, Boston. Community opposition to research at NEIDL, centered on concerns that the laboratory could expose the local population to dangerous pathogens, delayed work on BSL-2, BSL-3, and BSL-4 pathogens until 2012, 2014, and 2017, respectively.

In early 2014, BSL-4 research was still being opposed by community groups including the Union Park Neighborhood Association and Boston City Councilor Charles Yancey who was conducting hearings on its safety and recommending a citywide ban on BSL-4 research.

The NEIDL was given final approval for BSL-4 research by the Boston Public Health Commission (BPHC) on December 6, 2017, with the support of Boston Mayor Marty Walsh. Every project at the lab will require BPHC review and approval.

== Current research ==
As a result of the COVID-19 pandemic, the NEIDL paused research outside of SARS-CoV-2 diagnostics and countermeasures to respond to the COVID-19 pandemic.

== See also ==
- Galveston National Laboratory (GNL)
- National Institute of Allergy and Infectious Diseases (NIAID)
- Rocky Mountain Laboratories (RML)
