= Scott C. Weaver =

American virologist

Scott C. Weaver is an American virologist who is the research director of Galveston National Laboratory.

In 2014 he received the Walter Reed Medal from the American Society of Tropical Medicine & Hygiene.
