= Walter Reed Medal =

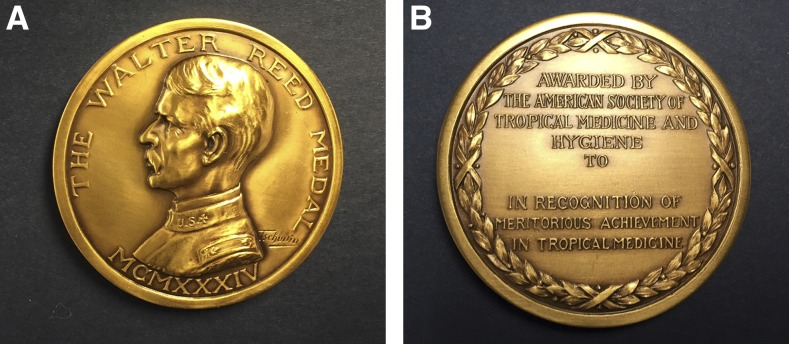
- Front (A) and back (B) of the Walter Reed Medal.
- Awarded for: Meritorious achievement in tropical medicine or global health by an individual or an institution
- Sponsored by: American Society of Tropical Medicine & Hygiene
- First award: 1936
- Website: https://www.astmh.org/awards-fellowships-medals/awards-and-honors/walter-reed-medal

The Walter Reed Medal may refer to the Congressional Gold Medal awarded to Major Walter Reed in 1929, or a medal currently awarded by the American Society of Tropical Medicine and Hygiene.

The Walter Reed Medal was established by the American Society of Tropical Medicine and Hygiene in 1934 to be awarded periodically in recognition of meritorious achievement in tropical medicine by an individual or an institution. The story of how Walter Reed led the Yellow Fever Commission in Havana that discovered the mosquito vector of the disease is legendary. The first medals were awarded in 1936, one medal was awarded to Mrs. Emilie Lawrence Reed to posthumously honor her husband Major Walter Reed for his work on Yellow Fever, and another to The Rockefeller Foundation for its study and control of Yellow Fever. Starting in 2021, the Walter Reed Medal was awarded annually.

It is of interest that in 1942 in a spirit of ecumenism, the award was made posthumously to Carlos J. Finlay - a Cuban contemporary of Walter Reed - to whom many credit the original idea that Yellow Fever was a mosquito-borne disease.

== Awardees ==
- 1936 - Mrs. Walter Reed and The Rockefeller Foundation
- 1939 - William Castle
- 1940 - Herbert Clark
- 1942 - Carlos Finlay
- 1944 - James Simmons
- 1946 - Paul Russell
- 1948 - Nicolaas Swellengrebel
- 1950 - Rolla Dyer
- 1953 - Lewis Hackett
- 1956 - Karl Meyer
- 1958 - Willard Wright
- 1960 - Sir Gordon Covell
- 1962 - William Cort
- 1963 - Ernest Carroll Faust
- 1966 - Henry Meleney
- 1969 - Albert Sabin
- 1972 - Fred Soper
- 1975 - Robert Briggs Watson
- 1978 - Harry Hoogstraal
- 1981 - Harry Most
- 1984 - Wilbur Downs
- 1987 - William Reeves
- 1990 - Paul Beaver and Will Burgdorfer
- 1993 - Donald Henderson and George Craig, Jr. and Robert Shope
- 1996 - Thomas Weller
- 1999 - Philip Russell
- 2002 - Thomas P. Monath
- 2005 - Karl Johnson
- 2008 - Richard L. Guerrant
- 2011 - Louis Miller
- 2014 - Scott C. Weaver
- 2015 - Alan J. Magill
- 2017 - Scott Halstead
- 2020 - Myron “Mike” Levine
- 2021 - Dyann Wirth
- 2022 - William A. Petri, Jr.
- 2023 - Charles H. Calisher
- 2024 - Stephen L. Hoffman

== Associated Awards ==
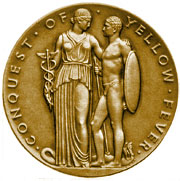
Congressional Gold Medal awarded to Walter Reed in 1929

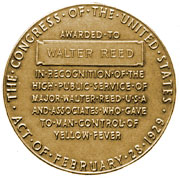
reverse

Of note, in conjunction with Walter Reed's receipt of the Congressional Gold Medal, the United States Congress established the Yellow Fever Roll of Honor on February 28, 1929 (Public Law 70-858, 45 Stat. 1409) to each of the persons listed below, "in special recognition of the high public service rendered and disabilities contracted in the interest of humanity and science as voluntary subjects for the experimentations during the yellow-fever investigations in Cuba"

- Aristides Agramonte
- James A. Andrus
- John R. Bullard
- James Carroll
- Doctor R. P. Cooke
- A. W. Covington
- William H. Dean
- Thomas M. England
- Levi E. Folk
- Wallace W. Forbes
- Paul Hamann
- James L. Hanberry
- James Hildebrand
- Warren G. Jernegan
- John R. Kissinger
- Jesse W. Lazear
- John J. Moran
- William Olsen
- Walter Reed
- Charles G. Sonntag
- Edward Weatherwalks
- Clyde L. West

On July 2, 1956, Congress passed a law (70 Stat. 484) to include Gustaf E. Lambert on the list.

On September 2, 1958, Congress passed a law (72 Stat. 1702) to include Roger P. Ames on the list.
