= Galveston National Laboratory =

High security National Biocontainment Laboratory

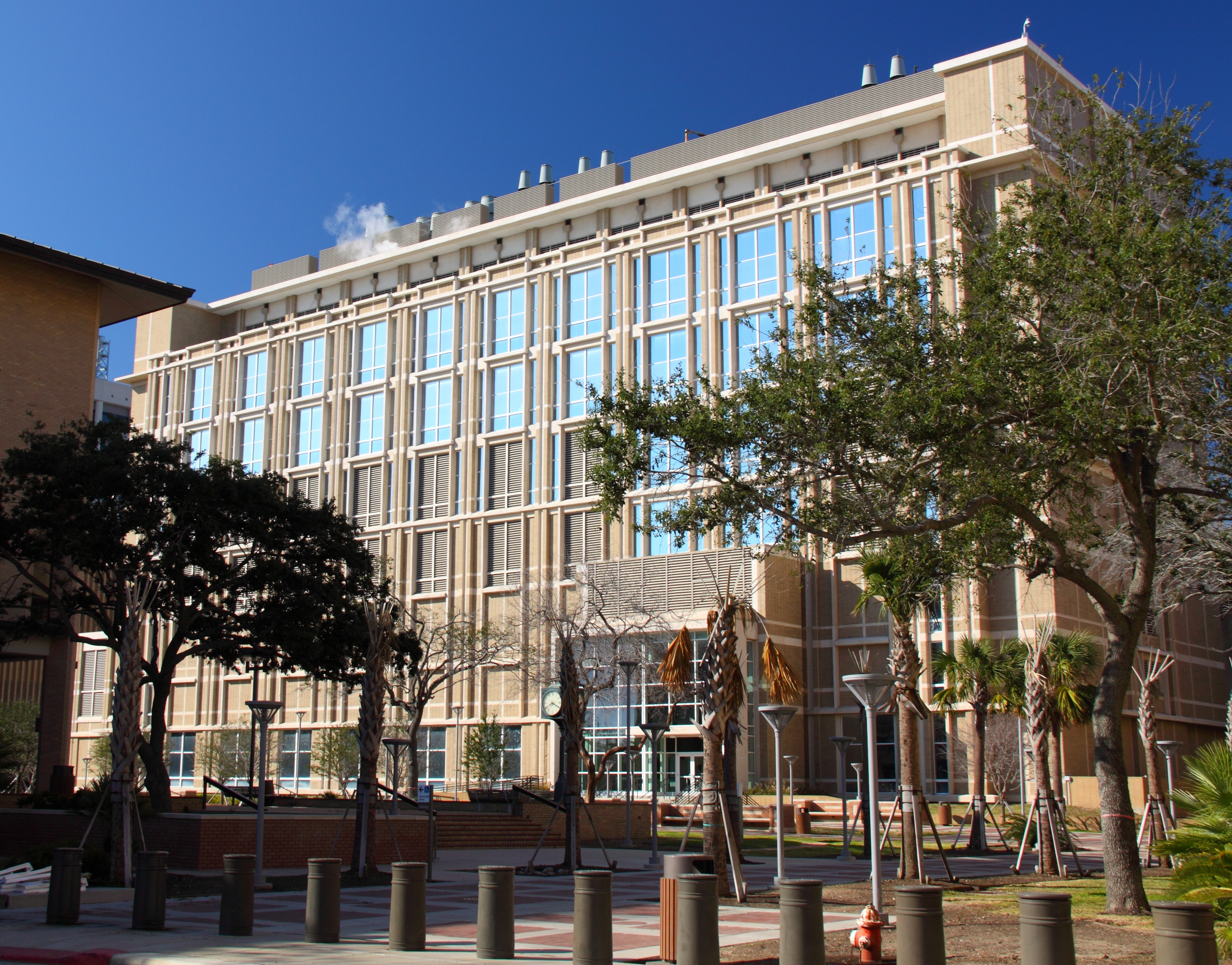
- Nickname: GNL
- Established: November 2008
- Research type: BSL-4 Biocontainment Laboratory
- Field of research: Infectious diseases Emerging pathogens Bioterrorism agents
- Director: Gene Olinger, Laboratory Director; Scott C. Weaver, Scientific Director
- Staff: 300
- Location: Galveston, Texas, US; 29.3106°N 94.7786°W
- Campus: University of Texas Medical Branch at Galveston
- Affiliations: National Institute of Allergy and Infectious Diseases; National Institutes of Health
- Operating agency: University of Texas Medical Branch with support from the National Institute of Allergy and Infectious Diseases and National Institutes of Health
- Website: www.utmb.edu/gnl

The Galveston National Laboratory (GNL) in Galveston, Texas, United States, is a high security National Biocontainment Laboratory housing several Biosafety level 4 research laboratories. The lab is run by the University of Texas Medical Branch (UTMB) for exotic disease diagnosis and research. The GNL is one of the 15 biosecurity level 4 facilities in the United States and the largest one in the world located on an academic campus.

== History ==
In the early 2000s, several incidents in the U.S. led to the federal government pushing for the creation of more facilities to provide research to help defend against bioterrorism attacks. Under the direction of the U.S. Congress, the National Institutes of Health (NIH) began a nationwide search for a location to build a National Biocontainment Laboratory. In 2003, UTMB was chosen by the NIH as the site for one of two such national laboratories, and a $174 million federal grant was issued to pay for its construction. The Galveston National Laboratory is one of only two such facilities in the United States. The other one is the National Emerging Infectious Diseases Laboratories (NEIDL). In 2020, the United States Department of Education launched an investigation of the Galveston National Laboratory regarding any past interaction with the Wuhan Institute of Virology.

== Statistics ==
Galveston National Laboratory is an eight-story structure that was built using construction standards designed to resist a Category 5 hurricane. In addition to structural design elements, other protective measures included support pilings reaching a depth of 120 feet (37 m) into the earth and the placement of all lab facilities at a height of at least 30 feet (9.1 m) above the 100-year floodplain. The building houses more than 80,000 sq ft (7,400 m^{2}) of laboratory space, of which 12,000 sq ft (1,100 m^{2}) is dedicated to BSL-4 use. Other labs located in the building include BSL-3 facilities which research select & non-select agents in cell cultures, animal and insects. The laboratory became operational in November 2008 and was dedicated by U.S. Senator Kay Bailey Hutchison. Attached to and functioning as a part of the GNL is the older Keiller Building, which houses additional BSL-2 and BSL-3 laboratories, including an insect BSL-3 lab. Also attached is the Shope BSL-4 lab, a smaller BSL-4 facility built in 2005.

== See also ==
- National Emerging Infectious Diseases Laboratories (NEIDL)
- National Institute of Allergy and Infectious Diseases (NIAID)
