= Wesley W. Spink =

Wesley William Spink (December 17, 1904 – May 14, 1988) was an American physician, medical school professor, college coach, and medical researcher. He was "an internationally recognized authority on infectious diseases and is credited with controlling the spread of brucellosis (undulant fever)".

== Early life ==
Spink was born in Duluth, Minnesota on December 17, 1904. In high school, he read extensively and was an outstanding football player. He attended the University of Wisconsin–Superior for one year and then, with the aid of a football scholarship, transferred to Carleton College in Northfield, Minnesota. There he graduated in 1926 with a degree in chemistry.

In the summer of 1925, he served as the pastor of a community church in South Dakota. From 1926 to 1928 at Nebraska's Doane College, he was an instructor in economics and public speaking and also coached football and track. During the summer of 1927, he attended the Chicago Theological Seminary.

He bought stocks with his salary from Doane College. In autumn 1928, one year before the crash of 1929, he sold his stocks for a substantial gain and enrolled in Harvard Medical School where, after one year, he was awarded a scholarship. He graduated with an M.D. in 1932. For 18 months from 1932 to 1933, he was a medical intern and was a medical resident at Boston City Hospital from 1933 to 1936. During these years, he was influenced by Hans Zinsser and George Minot and co-authored a number of papers with his supervisor Chester Keefer.

== Career ==
At the University of Minnesota Medical School, Spink was an assistant professor from 1937 to 1941, an associate professor from 1941 to 1946, and a full professor from 1946 to 1967, when he was appointed the Medical School's first Regents' professor. He retired in 1973 as Regents' professor emeritus.

He was widely known for his research on sulfa drugs and was the first to use sulfa drugs for therapy and administer antibiotics (penicillin and tetracycline) at the University of Minnesota Hospitals. Because of Dr. Spink's work, along with his colleagues at the University, the Minnesota Legislature enacted a law requiring the pasteurization of all milk for human consumption in 1950.

Spink did research on gonorrhea, streptococcal pharyngitis, staphylococcal infections, brucellosis, and sepsis and septic shock caused by Gram-negative bacteria. He was the author of 3 books and the author or co-author of about 500 articles. He served as president of the American Society for Clinical Investigation in 1949 and of American College of Physicians from 1963 to 1964. He established the Wesley Spink Memorial Lecture with the University of Minnesota's administration and the Medical School; the first Memorial Lecture was presented in 1971 by William Ian Beardmore Beveridge.

== Personal life ==
In 1935, Spink married Elizabeth Hamilton Hurd, a Vassar graduate and a daughter of Randolph C. Hurd, who graduated from Harvard Medical School in 1899 and began to practice medicine in Newburyport, Massachusetts in 1901. Wesley and Elizabeth Spink had a daughter, Helen, and a son, William. Helen Spink married Robert DuPont, M.D.

He died on May 14, 1988, in Minneapolis, Minnesota.

== Selected publications ==
- Spink, Wesley William (1940). Outline of Infectious Diseases.
- Spink, W. W. (1942). Sulfanilamide and Related Compounds in General Practice (2nd ed.). Chicago: Year Book Publishers.
- Spink, Wesley W. (1956). The Nature of Brucellosis. University of Minnesota Press. ISBN 9781452912547.
- Wesley W. Spink Papers: Brucellosis Collection. 1987.
- Spink, Wesley William (January 1978). Infectious Diseases: Prevention and Treatment in the Nineteenth and Twentieth Centuries. University of Minnesota Press. ISBN 9781452910369.
