= Maxwell Finland =

American medical researcher

- Максвелл Фінланд
- Born: March 15, 1902; Zhashkiv, Russian Empire (now Ukraine)
- Died: October 25, 1987 (aged 85); Boston, Massachusetts, United States
- Occupations: Scientist, medical researcher, infectious disease expert

Maxwell Finland (Note: Ukrainian: Максвелл Фінланд, romanized: Maksvell Finland) (March 15, 1902 – October 25, 1987) was an American scientist, medical researcher, and an expert on infectious diseases. Finland led seminal research of antibiotic treatment of pneumonia.

== Early life and education ==
Finland was born on March 15, 1902, in Zhashkiv near Kyiv, Ukraine. He immigrated as a child to the United States at the age of 4. Finland graduated from the Boston English High School and cum laude from Harvard College in 1922. He then graduated from Harvard Medical School in 1926.

== Antibiotic research ==
In 1944, he worked with Chester Keefer at the Boston City Hospital on the first studies using penicillin to treat infectious diseases.

He was noted for his strong criticism of pharmaceutical companies for their marketing of fixed-dose antibiotics. His outspoken criticism helped in withdrawal of those drugs from the market. He also made significant contributions to early identifications of new infectious issues, such as resistances of bacteria to antibiotics.

== Legacy ==
Finland was a member of the National Academies of Sciences. His name appeared on about 800 scientific papers. Finland turned over the money he received for numerous awards to Harvard endowment. It is estimated that between his money and the money he influenced companies to give to the school, the total contribution was around 6 million dollars. An annual Maxwell Finland Award was established in 1988 by the National Foundation for Infectious Diseases. The National Academies Press called Finland "a giant in the field of infectious diseases". National Foundation for Infectious Diseases called Finland "a distinguished scholar and scientist who pioneered work in epidemiology and antimicrobial resistance, and helped define the discipline of infectious diseases as we know it today".

A building on the Boston University School of Medicine campus on Albany Street is named The Maxwell Finland Building and has housed The Maxwell Finland Laboratory for Infectious Diseases.

== Awards and distinctions ==
- inaugural president of the Infectious Diseases Society of America
- a member of the National Academy of Sciences
- the Kober Medal of the Association of American Physicians
- the Bristol Award of the Infectious Diseases Society of America
- the Chapin Award of the City of Providence
- the Philips Award of the American College of Physicians
- the Oscar B. Hunter Award of the American Society of Clinical Pharmacology and Therapeutics
- the Sheen Award of the American Medical Association
- honorary degrees from Western Reserve and Thomas Jefferson Universities
- honorary doctor of science (honoris causa) degree from Harvard University (1982)
- Minot Chair at Harvard
