= Betty Lindsay =

Scottish civil engineer, working in Albania

- Born: 9 October 1897; China
- Died: 11 January 1953 (aged 55)
- Occupation: Civil engineer

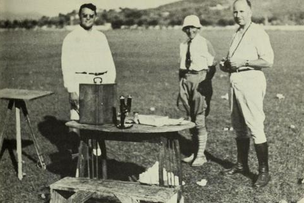
Engineers Frederick W. Knipe, Betty Lindsay and ecologist, Dr Lewis W. Hackett in Albania

Betty Lindsay (Minnie Elizabeth Barclay Lindsay) (9 October 1897 – 11 January 1953) was an early professional civil engineer working in Albania and, in 1921, may have been only the second female engineering graduate (after Elizabeth Georgeson in 1919) of the University of Edinburgh.

== Early life and education ==
Betty Lindsay was born in China but her family returned to Scotland when she was three years old. Her father, Edward John Lindsay was a banker. Both her parents died by 1913 so she went to live with her uncle in Evie, Orkney. In 1921 she obtained a BSc in mechanical engineering from the University of Edinburgh (she had also been awarded a second-class certificate of merit in mechanical engineering during her studies). In her career, however, she worked mainly as a civil engineer. From 1922 to 1925 she worked for William Tawse Ltd as an engineering assistant.

== Work in Albania ==
Lindsay was a Scottish member of the Women's Engineering Society and in 1926 its journal, The Woman Engineer, reported that she had volunteered for an anti-malarial mission to Albania, which also included female doctors, a nurse and a driver. The mission had been organised by Lady Carnarvon; she had established schools, hospitals and clinics in Albania after the death in 1923 of her son, Aubrey Herbert, who had been a leading advocate of Albanian independence. The article noted that having arrived at the State Hospital, Valona (Vlorë), on 21 March that year, she undertook duties which ‘at present consist of organising and supervising the work of draining, ditching and filling in pits, etc., and in clipping for and examining mosquito larvae’.

Lindsay remained in Albania until the outbreak of the Second World War in 1939, working on anti-malarial civil engineering projects throughout the country, and with the Rockefeller Foundation Malarial control engineer, Frederick W. Knipe, and International Health Board ecologist Dr Lewis W. Hackett.

== Later life ==
She then returned to the UK and became a technical translator for the Air Ministry, where she remained working, latterly as Chief Translator, until her death in 1953. She was buried in the family grave in Edinkillie, Morayshire.
