= George L. Drusano =

American physician

George Louis Drusano (born 22 August 1949 in Baltimore - 10 June 2025 in Orlando FL) was an American physician and medical researcher.

Drusano attended Loyola High School in Baltimore and studied physics at Boston College with a bachelor's degree in 1971. He then studied medicine at the University of Maryland with an M.D. in 1975. After a chief residency at the University of Maryland Hospital, he became a professor of medicine there. From 1992 to 2011 he was a professor at the Albany Medical Center Hospital, where he was the director of clinical pharmacology. Since 2011 he was the director of the University of Florida's Institute for Therapeutic Innovation.

Drusano studies the pharmacodynamics of antibiotics and antiviral drugs against infectious diseases, including mathematical modeling. His research includes anti-infective pharmacology against bacteria such as Mycobacterium tuberculosis and Pseudomonas aeruginosa, viruses such as hepatitis C virus and HIV, and pathogens in bioweapons and bioterrorism.

He received in 1991 the Rhone-Poulenc Award, in 2012 the Maxwell Finland Award, and in 2015 the Paul Ehrlich Magic Bullet Award. From 2000 to 2002, he was president of the International Society for Anti-Infective Pharmacology (ISAP). For 10 years he was the editor of the Section of Pharmacology at the journal Antimicrobial Agents and Chemotherapy. He was the author or co-author of over 300 research articles.

He died on June 10, 2025, in Orlando, FL.
