= Chester Keefer =

American physician (1897–1972)

Personal details
- Born: Chester Scott Keefer; 1897 Altoona, Pennsylvania
- Died: February 3, 1972 (aged 74–75) Brookline, Massachusetts
- Spouse(s): Jean Balfour, Dorothy Campbell
- Children: Ishbel McGill Keefer Lyle
- Parent(s): John Henry Keefer, Jessie G. Scott
- Education: Bucknell University; Johns Hopkins School of Medicine
- Profession: Physician

Chester Scott Keefer (1897–1972) was an American physician. He served as "penicillin czar" during World War II, responsible for managing distribution and allocation of the then-new drug for civilian uses in the United States, and was dean of the Boston University School of Medicine.

== Early life and education ==
Chester Keefer was born in Altoona, Pennsylvania, in 1897, to John Henry Keefer and Jessie G. Scott. He received a bachelor's degree from Bucknell University in 1918, and graduated from Johns Hopkins School of Medicine in 1922. He was married to Jean Balfour and later to Dorothy Campbell, and had a daughter, Ishbel (Keefer) Lyle.

== Career ==
Keefer taught at Johns Hopkins, the University of Chicago, and Peking Union Medical College (then spelled Peiping Union Medical College) in Beijing, China, before spending 10 years at Harvard University's Thorndike Memorial Laboratory, at Boston City Hospital. In 1940, he took a position at the Boston University School of Medicine, where he spent the remainder of his career and where he worked to develop the research capacity and reputation of the Evans Memorial Department of Clinical Research.

In July 1943, facing shortages of the newly developed antibiotic penicillin, the U.S. War Production Board put Dr. Keefer in charge of domestic supplies and distribution of the drug, which was reserved primarily for military use. For eight months he served as "penicillin czar", responsible for rationing civilian use and monitoring clinical reports in order to compile a fuller picture of the uses and limitations of the new drug. In this role, he personally reviewed all potential civilian cases, making the determination of which individuals would receive the drug and which would not. In 1944, as a specialist in chemotherapy, he was one of 19 physicians named as civilian consultants to the office of the U.S. Surgeon General. In his position at Boston University, he also played a major role in Isaac Asimov's development as one of America's most eminent science writers – by firing him from his teaching role at the BU School of Medicine. Because Asimov had tenure, he retained his title of Associate Professor.

After the war, Keefer served as assistant for health and medical affairs to the Secretary of Health, Education, and Welfare during the presidential administration of Dwight D. Eisenhower. He was Dean of Boston University School of Medicine from 1955 to 1960, and the school named the Chester Scott Keefer Auditorium in his honor in 1971.

== Professional associations and later life ==
Chester Keefer contributed to the medical literature as author or co-author of 117 articles in professional journals, and was an active member of professional associations, serving as a member of the American Academy of Arts and Sciences since 1943, a member of the American Philosophical Society since 1951, president of the American College of Physicians in 1960–61, and of the American Clinical and Climatological Association in 1963–64.

He died in February, 1972, at the age of 74.
