= Nicolaas Swellengrebel =

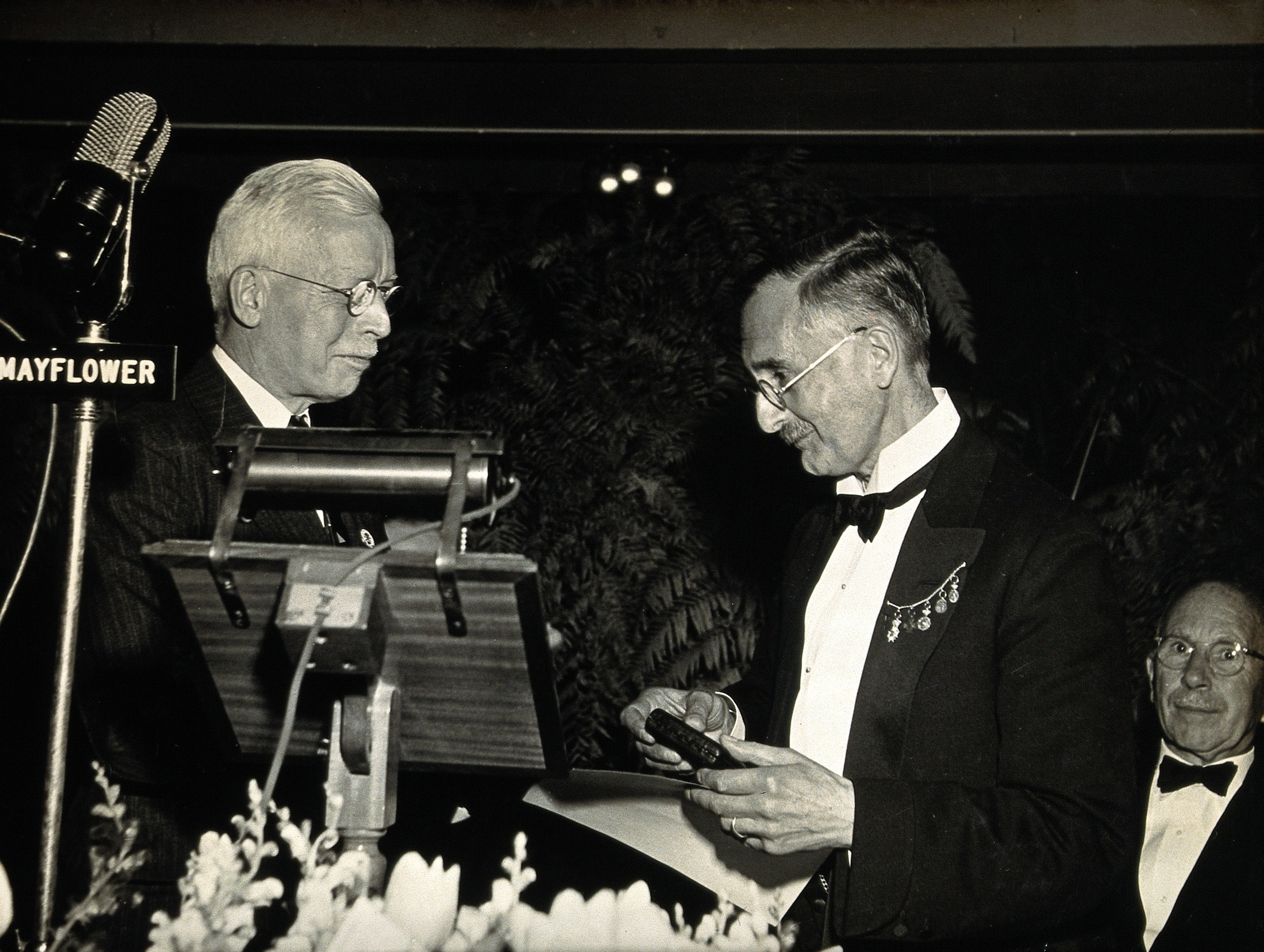
Swellengrebel (right) receiving the Laveran Prize in 1948 from Rolla Dyer

Nicolaas Hendrik Swellengrebel (12 August 1885 – 1 January 1970) was a Dutch epidemiologist, parasitologist, pathologist, and specialist on several human diseases, particularly malaria. He pioneered an ecological approach to the management of the habitat to control vector species that he called as "species sanitation." The N.H. Swellengrebel Laboratory for Tropical Hygiene in Amsterdam is named after him.

== Life and work ==
Born in an upper-class Amsterdam family, the son of Mari Adriaan Swellengrebel and Ida de Graaf. He became interested in biology at high school and went to university to study biology at the University of Zurich and at the University of Amsterdam where professor Hugo de Vries warned him of the lack of jobs in the field. He then worked at the Pasteur Institute in Paris in 1907. One of early works was to show that spirochetes were not bacteria and he described Borrelia after Dr. Amédée Borrel. He was also influenced by Robert Koch and Louis Pasteur but found that medical researchers lacked a sound training or interest in many aspects of biology. His first work in public health was on plague dealing with an outbreak in Holland and in the colonies in Indonesia and Java. While in Southeast Asia he met the malariologist W.A.P. Schüffner and began to collaborate with him on malarial studies. He saw the need for entomological studies and made more trips in the region, accompanied by his wife Meta, and sought a naturalistic approach to the management of vectors by modification of the habitats, a method that he called "species sanitation." This required a knowledge of the biology of malaria vectors that examined the habitat and biology of the species found in a location and the niches occupied by the main vector species. He was against the use of methods that targeted mosquitoes in general or even a genus but examined how to target single species. He was also interested in the evolution of human resistance to malaria. In 1948 he was awarded the Walter Reed Medal from the American Society of Tropical Medicine and Hygiene. A biography of Swellengrebel was published in 2011.
