= Michael D. Gershon =

American biologist

Dr. Michael D. Gershon is the author of The Second Brain and the chairman of the department of anatomy and cell biology at Columbia University.

He served as the 72nd president of the American Association of Anatomists from 1995 to 1996.

== See also ==
- Ulcerative colitis
- Enteric nervous system
- Myenteric plexus
