= Robert Steffen =

Swiss epidemiologist

- Education: University of Zurich
- Awards: Honorary Fellow of the Australasian College of Tropical Medicine
- Scientific career
- Workplaces: University of Zurich

Robert Steffen is an emeritus professor at the Epidemiology, Biostatistics and Prevention Institute, University of Zurich, Switzerland and an adjunct professor at the University of Texas School of Public in Houston. He is an editor of the Journal of Travel Medicine.

== Education ==
Robert Steffen was born and raised in Zurich. He was a medical student at the local university and towards the end of his medical studies, he was elected as the president of the International Federation of Medical Students Association.

He initially trained to become a flight surgeon at the Swiss Air Force Medical Institute. Subsequently, he obtained a broad education in Internal medicine and epidemiology at academic institutions in Sydney, Nairobi, Johannesburg, Chicago, San Francisco, and London.

== Research and career ==
Steffen's research focused on the epidemiology and prevention of infectious diseases in travelers. Areas of research included malaria, vaccines and travelers' diarrhea. He conducted a study on the oral antibiotic formulation Rifamycin SV – MMX for treating traveler's diarrhea and also promoted researches on the interests of older travelers. Lately he focused on a viral infection called Tick-borne encephalitis (TBE).

In the early days of his career, he served as a Chief Border Physician at the Zurich Airport. Steffen served as Chair of the 2018 IHR Emergency Committee and Vice-Chair of the 2014-2016 IHR Emergency Committee for Ebola Virus Disease (EVD). During the Gulf War he was the leader of Task Force Scorpio.

== Awards and honors ==
He currently serves as the member of the Swiss Society for Infectious Diseases and an honorary fellow of the Australasian College of Tropical Medicine. Additional award includes the Bronze Medal of the City of Paris and also received the honor of serving as the chairman of the W.H.O. emergency committee. He also has served as the president for International Society of Travel Medicine (ISTM).

== Publications ==
- Epidemiology of tick-borne encephalitis (TBE) in international travellers to Western/Central Europe and conclusions on vaccination recommendations.
- Rifamycin SV-MMX® for treatment of travellers' diarrhea: equally effective as ciprofloxacin and not associated with the acquisition of multi-drug resistant bacteria.
- Traveler's diarrhea: a clinical review.
- Travel vaccine preventable diseases-updated logarithmic scale with monthly incidence rates.
- Influenza in travelers: epidemiology, risk, prevention, and control issues.
