= Percy George Shute =

English malariologist and entomologist (1894-1977)

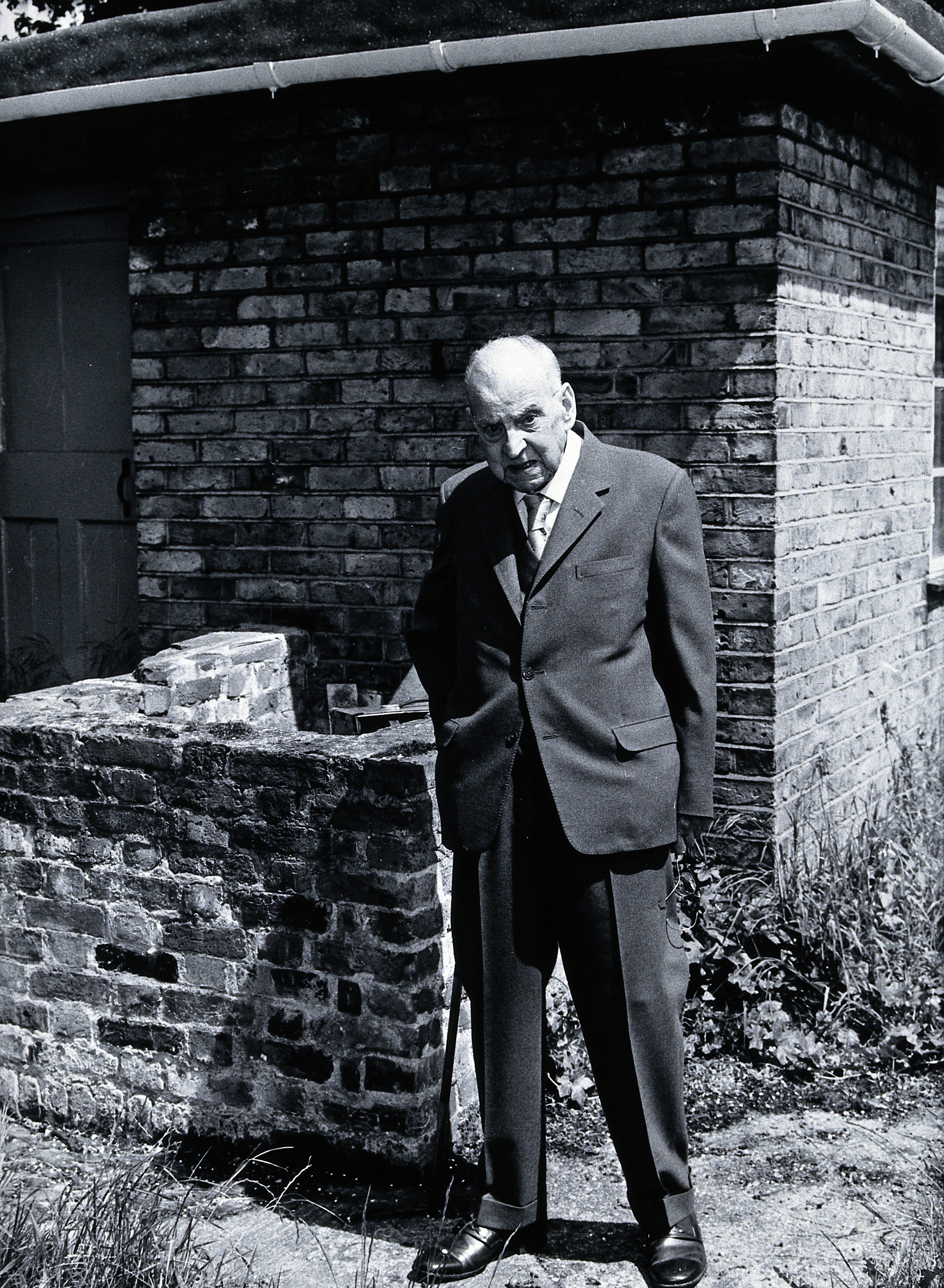
Photograph from the Wellcome Library

Percy George Shute MBE OBE (16 May 1894 – 26 January 1977) was an English malariologist and entomologist who worked at the Mott Clinic at the Horton Hospital in Essex which was also known from 1952 to 1973 as the Malaria Reference Laboratory.

Shute was born, the ninth child of plumber Sidney Thomas and Rose Helena Leyman in Honiton. After apprenticing as a baker he joined the 10th Devonshire Regiment in 1914, serving in France and Salonika. After contracting the disease he returned to England in 1917 and while convalescing at Guildford Hospital he met Ronald Ross at the pathology laboratory who trained him in staining parasites and dissecting mosquitoes. He later trained in malaria treatment under Julius Wagner-Jauregg from 1922 and was involved in the establishment of the Mott Clinic at the Horton Hospital in 1925. He worked here until his retirement, becoming assistant director and a specialist on the British mosquitoes and on malaria. He was involved, along with Marjorie Ethel (Mary) Maryon, in the training of malariologists from around the world on laboratory techniques. He also worked at the Department of Entomology of the London School of Hygiene and Tropical Medicine. The Mott Clinic was closed in 1973 after the retirement of Shute. Nearly 17000 patients were treated for general paresis of the insane using malarial therapy at the Clinic. Shute was an honorary fellow of the Royal Society of Tropical Medicine and Hygiene. He was honoured with an MBE in 1948 and an OBE in 1971.

Shute married Edith Emily Maslin of Dorking in 1920. They had two children, a son, Gerald Thomas Shute (1922–1996) who also became a parasitologist and a daughter, Pauline who died young. Edith died in 1960 at Epsom where the family lived after retirement. Shute died at Leatherhead in 1977.
