= Boston City Hospital =

Former hospital in Massachusetts, United States

Geography
- Location: South End, Boston, Massachusetts, United States
- Coordinates: 42°20′6.43″N 71°4′23.27″W

Services
- Emergency department: Yes

History
- Constructed: 1861
- Opened: 1864
- Closed: 1996

Links
- Lists: Hospitals in Massachusetts

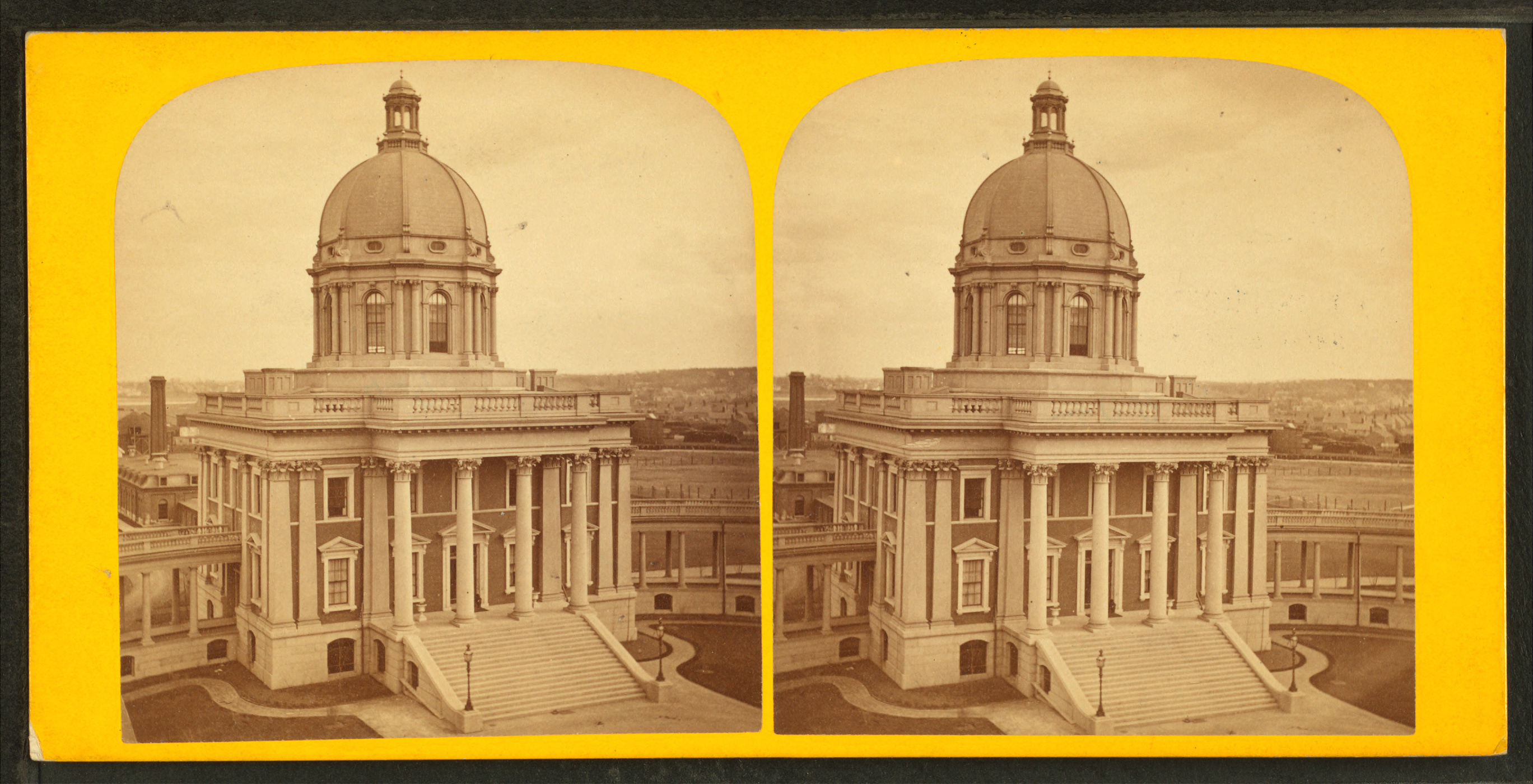
Boston City Hospital, Harrison Avenue, Boston, 19th century (photo by John B. Heywood)

The Boston City Hospital (1864–1996), in Boston, Massachusetts, was a public hospital located in the South End. It was "intended for the use and comfort of poor patients, to whom medical care will be provided at the expense of the city, and ... to provide accommodations and medical treatment to others, who do not wish to be regarded as dependent on public charity."

In 1996, it merged with the Boston University Medical Center Hospital to form the Boston Medical Center.

This building is under study for Boston Landmark status by the Boston Landmarks Commission.

== History ==
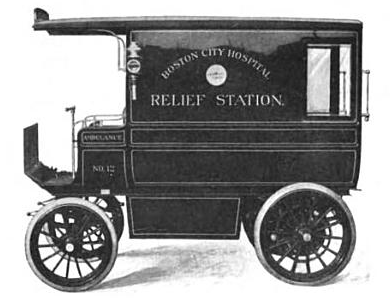
The Boston City Hospital "relief station" at Haymarket Square quartered an ambulance like this, c. 1905

In the mid-19th century, "the hospital was suggested [...] by Elisha Goodnow, who, by his will, dated July 12, 1849, gave property to the city valued at $25,000, for establishment of a free city hospital in Wards Eleven or Twelve." Architect Gridley James Fox Bryant designed the first hospital, built 1861–1864 on Harrison Avenue in the South End. It was renovated in 1875 and again in 1891–1892.

As of 1905, the hospital consisted of "[1] the hospital proper, on the area bounded by Harrison Avenue, East Concord Street, Albany Street and Massachusetts Avenue, containing 430,968 square feet, or 9.9 acres; [2] the South Department, 745 Massachusetts Avenue, containing 125,736 square feet, or 2.9 acres; [3] the ambulance station, boiler and dynamo house, coal-pocket and wharf, Albany street, containing 69,785 square feet, or 1.6 acres; [4] the convalescent home, Dorchester Avenue, Dorchester, containing 610,500 square feet, or 14 acres; and [5] the relief station, Haymarket Square, 8,507 square feet, or 0.2 acres."

In 1923, the Thorndike Memorial Laboratory was established at Boston City Hospital with support provided by Dr. George L. Thorndike in memory of his brother, William, a long-time City Hospital staff member. The Thorndike had 17 beds for clinical research and became one of the nation's most distinguished research facilities. Seminal studies in hematology and related discliplies were conducted in this facility by Harvard Medical School faculty and other investigators.

In 1968, the Finland Laboratory for Infectious Diseases was established at Boston City Hospital in honor of Dr. Maxwell Finland, a leading clinical investigator in infectious diseases. When academic and clinical responsibility for Boston City Hospital passed to Boston University in 1973, these laboratories were incorporated into the research programs of the Boston University Department of Medicine faculty.

As of 2008, the buildings at 818 Harrison Avenue are partially extant: "some sections of the original hospital remain here and there within the hodgepodge of later construction."

== See also ==
- A Case of Need
- Boston Medical Center
- Combat Zone (Boston)#In art and popular culture
