= National Foundation for Infectious Diseases =

U.S. non-profit organization

- Abbreviation: NFID
- Founders: Richard J. Duma; John P. Utz
- Founded at: Virginia
- Type: 501(c)(3) non-profit organization
- Purpose: Educate and engage the public, communities, and healthcare professionals about infectious diseases across the lifespan
- Headquarters: Bethesda, Maryland
- President: Jeffery A. Goad, PharmD
- Treasurer: Kevin Rooney
- Medical Director: Robert H. Hopkins, Jr., MD
- Website: www.nfid.org

The National Foundation for Infectious Diseases (abbreviated NFID) is a 501(c)(3) non-profit organization dedicated to educating the public and medical community about infectious diseases. It was established in 1973 and is based in Bethesda, Maryland.

== History ==
The National Foundation for Infectious Diseases originated at the Medical College of Virginia's Infectious Disease Division. In early 1973, several individuals there had the idea of creating a non-governmental organization to raise awareness of, and help develop treatments for, infectious diseases. Later that year, the NFID was created, originally as a non-profit corporation based in Virginia. The original founders of the NFID included John P. Utz and Richard J. Duma, who served as the organization's first and second president, respectively.
