= American Society of Tropical Medicine and Hygiene =

American non-profit organization

The American Society of Tropical Medicine and Hygiene (ASTMH) is an Arlington, Virginia-based non-profit organization of scientists, clinicians, students and program professionals whose longstanding mission is to promote global health through the prevention and control of infectious and other diseases that disproportionately afflict the global poor. ASTMH members work in areas of research, health care and education that encompass laboratory science, international field studies, clinical care and country-wide programs of disease control. The current organization was formed in 1951 with the amalgamation of the American Society of Tropical Medicine, founded in 1903, and the National Malaria Society, founded in 1941.

ASTMH has more than 2,700 members from all regions of the world including North America, South America, Europe, Asia and Africa. The Society publishes The American Journal of Tropical Medicine and Hygiene, a monthly scientific publication.

== History ==
ASTMH began as The Society of Tropical Medicine of Philadelphia, founded by a group of 28 physicians on March 9, 1903. The group changed its name just 12 days later to The American Society of Tropical Medicine (ASTM). The impetus for the creation of the ASTM was a need for greater understanding of tropical diseases, spurred by growing American interests in the tropics, and new medical discoveries in the late 19th century. The Society's first president was Thomas Fenton, an ophthalmologist educated at the University of Pennsylvania Medical School. Soon after its founding, ASTM began to expand beyond Philadelphia, holding annual meetings in Baltimore, New York City and Washington, D.C., in its first five years of existence. In 1908, Clara Southmayd Ludlow was elected the Society's first female active member and first non-physician scientist member. Among other early members and leaders, ASTM's fourth president, William Crawford Gorgas, played a role in battling yellow fever in Panama. The Society grew slowly but steadily over the ensuing decades, reaching 516 members by 1941, and subsequently 1,213 members by the end of American involvement in World War II, at which point almost half of ASTM members were in the Armed Forces.

The National Malaria Committee was founded in 1916 by Frederick L. Hoffman, chief statistician for the Prudential Insurance Company. The committee's membership grew in parallel with ASTM's. In 1941, the National Malaria Committee changed its name to the National Malaria Society. As malaria became less of a threat in the United States, the Society decided to broaden its focus, and eventually merged with ASTM in 1951 to form a new society, the American Society of Tropical Medicine and Hygiene.

In 1991, American physician-scientist, virologist and epidemiologist Scott Halstead served as ASTMH's president.

== Journal ==
American Journal of Tropical Medicine and Hygiene
- Language: English

Publication details
- History: 1952–present
- Publisher: American Society of Tropical Medicine and Hygiene

Standard abbreviations
- ISO 4: Am. J. Trop. Med. Hyg.

Indexing
- CODEN: AJTHAB
- ISSN: 0002-9637 (print); 1476-1645 (web)
- OCLC no.: 01724826

The American Journal of Tropical Medicine and Hygiene is the official scientific journal of ASTMH published since 1952. It was formed as a result of the merger of American Journal of Tropical Medicine (ISSN 0096-6746) and Journal of the National Malaria Society (ISSN 0096-7017). Content includes original scientific articles and covering new research with an emphasis on laboratory science and the application of technology in the fields of tropical medicine, parasitology, immunology, infectious diseases, epidemiology, basic and molecular biology, virology and international medicine. The Journal publishes unsolicited peer-reviewed manuscripts, invited review articles, short reports, case studies, reports on the efficacy of new drugs and methods of treatment, prevention and control methodologies, new testing methods and equipment, book reports and letters to the editor. Topics range from applied epidemiology in such relevant areas as HIV/AIDS to the molecular biology of vaccine development.

== Meetings and education ==
ASTMH holds an annual scientific meeting that is open to and attended by both ASTMH members and non-members from the Americas and internationally. Participants, with multiple interests in bacterial, viral, and parasitic infections and their spread, transmission and control, including researchers, clinicians, postdoctoral fellows and students gather at the annual meetings for scientific sessions, educational plenaries, workshops and poster sessions. The 67th Annual Meeting was held in New Orleans, Louisiana, October 28 - November 1, 2018. The 68th Annual Meeting was held from November 20–24, 2019, in National Harbour, Maryland (Washington, DC area)

The Society also holds an annual Intensive Update Course in Clinical Tropical Medicine and Travelers' Health. ASTMH offers a Certificate Examination that assesses and recognizes individual excellence in training and knowledge. Passing the examination leads to a Certificate of Knowledge in Clinical Tropical Medicine and Travelers' Health (CTropMed).

== Policy and advocacy ==
In the last decade, ASTMH has become increasingly involved in policy and advocacy activities, particularly advocating for U.S. federal funds to fight tropical diseases worldwide and improve global health. In the current fiscal year, ASTMH has advocated that U.S. Congress:

- Allocate funds to battle the global malaria epidemic to ensure that insecticides, bed nets and preventive treatment are delivered to communities in need
- Increase the U.S. contribution to The Global Fund to Fight AIDS, Tuberculosis and Malaria
- Fund the U.S. Department of Defense and the Centers for Disease Control and Prevention to build and grow malaria research and prevention programs
- Provide specific funding to support American health professionals going overseas to work in tropical disease control
- Appropriate funds to support additional biomedical and clinical research to develop treatment and vaccines for neglected tropical diseases

== Awards ==
ASTMH bestows a number of annual and bi-annual awards for distinguished achievements in the fields of tropical medicine and global health, including:

- The Bailey K. Ashford Medal, awarded for distinguished work in tropical medicine to a worker in his or her early or mid-career.
- The Ben Kean Medal, recognizing a clinician or educator whose dedication to clinical tropical medicine and impact on the training of students, fellows and/or practitioners of tropical medicine is in keeping with the tradition established by Kean.
- The Joseph Augustin LePrince Medal, in recognition of outstanding work in the field of malariology.
- The Donald Mackay Medal, for outstanding work in tropical health, especially relating to improvements in the health of rural or urban workers in the tropics.
- The Walter Reed Medal, to recognize distinguished accomplishment in the field of tropical medicine.
- The Harry Hoogstraal Medal for outstanding achievement in medical entomology

ASTMH also awards fellowships to qualifying students and early professionals.

== See also ==
- Royal Society of Tropical Medicine and Hygiene
