= William Hall =

William Hall, Will Hall or Bill Hall may refer to:

== Actors ==
- William Brad Hall (born 1958), American actor
- William Hall (actor), American actor
- William Hall (actor, born 1903) (1903–1986), American actor
- William Hall Jr. (1946–2025), American actor

== Military ==
- William Hutcheon Hall (1797–1878), British naval officer
- William Hall (VC) (1827–1904), Canadian royal naval hero
- William Henry Hall (1842–1895), first director of naval intelligence of the Royal Navy
- William Preble Hall (1848–1927), U.S. Army brigadier general and Medal of Honor recipient
- William Reginald Hall (1870–1943), British naval officer and MP
- William Evens Hall (1907–1984), U.S. Air Force lt. general and member of the Reserve Officers Association (ROA) Minuteman Hall of Fame
- William E. Hall (1913–1996), U.S. naval aviator and Medal of Honor recipient

== Politicians ==
- William Hall (governor) (1775–1856), American politician, governor of Tennessee
- William A. Hall (1815–1888), U.S. representative from Missouri
- William Sprigg Hall (1832–1875), American lawyer and politician
- William H. Hall (1869–1922), American politician
- William Reginald Hall (1870–1943), British naval officer and MP
- William Samuel Hall (1871–1938), dentist and Canadian federal politician
- William Lorimer Hall (1876–1958), lawyer, judge and political figure in Nova Scotia, Canada
- William Hall (Australian politician) (1902–1963), Australian politician
- William O. Hall (1914–1977), American diplomat
- William Hall (Illinois politician), Illinois politician and member of Chicago City Council
- Bill Hall (New Mexico politician)
- William Pike Hall Sr. (1896–1945), member of the Louisiana State Senate

== Engineers and scientists ==
- William Brenton Hall (1764–1809), American physician
- William Whitty Hall (1810–1876), American physician, writer and editor of health magazines
- William Hammond Hall (1845–1934), American civil engineer
- William Bateman Hall (1923–2003), professor of nuclear engineering at the University of Manchester
- William Hall (virologist), Irish chair of medical microbiology and professor
- William Phillips Hall (1864–1937), American lay evangelist, railroad transportation executive, and electrical engineer

== Sports ==
- William Hall (cricketer, born 1853) (1853–1911), English cricketer
- William Hall (cricketer, born 1878) (1878–?), English cricketer
- Billy Hall (rugby) (1889–1964), English rugby union and rugby league footballer of the 1910s, and 1920s for Gloucester (RU), Great Britain (RL), England, and Oldham
- Bill Hall (pitcher) (1894–1947), American Major League Baseball (MLB) pitcher
- Bill Hall (catcher) (1928–1986), American MLB catcher
- Billy Hall (Australian footballer) (1915–2002), Australian rules football
- Bill Hall (utility player) (born 1979), American MLB utility player
- Will Hall (American football) (born 1980), American football coach
- William Hall (basketball) (born 1991), British basketball player
- William Hall (rugby union), Irish international rugby union player

== Other people ==
- William Hall (poet) (1748–1825), English poet and antiquarian
- William Hall (publisher) (1800–1847), English publisher who with Edward Chapman founded Chapman & Hall
- William Shakespeare Hall (1825–1895), English settler and explorer in Australia
- William Edward Hall (1835–1894), English lawyer and mountaineer
- William Knight Hall (1855–1900s), English political activist
- William James Hall (1860–1894), Canadian missionary to Korea
- William Preston Hall (1864–1932), American showman, businessman, and circus impresario
- William Weeks Hall (1894–1958), American artist, photographer and art critic.
- William Hall, 2nd Viscount Hall (1913–1985), Welsh surgeon and businessman
- William Hall (Lord Lieutenant) (born 1934), Northern Irish businessman, farmer and public servant
- Will Hall (writer) (born 1966), American mental health advocate, writer, and counselor
- The Bill Hall Trio, a musical comedy act

== Other uses ==
- HMCS William Hall, a Harry DeWolf-class offshore patrol vessel for the Royal Canadian Navy

== See also ==
- Willie Hall (disambiguation)
