= Roger I. Glass =

American physician-scientist

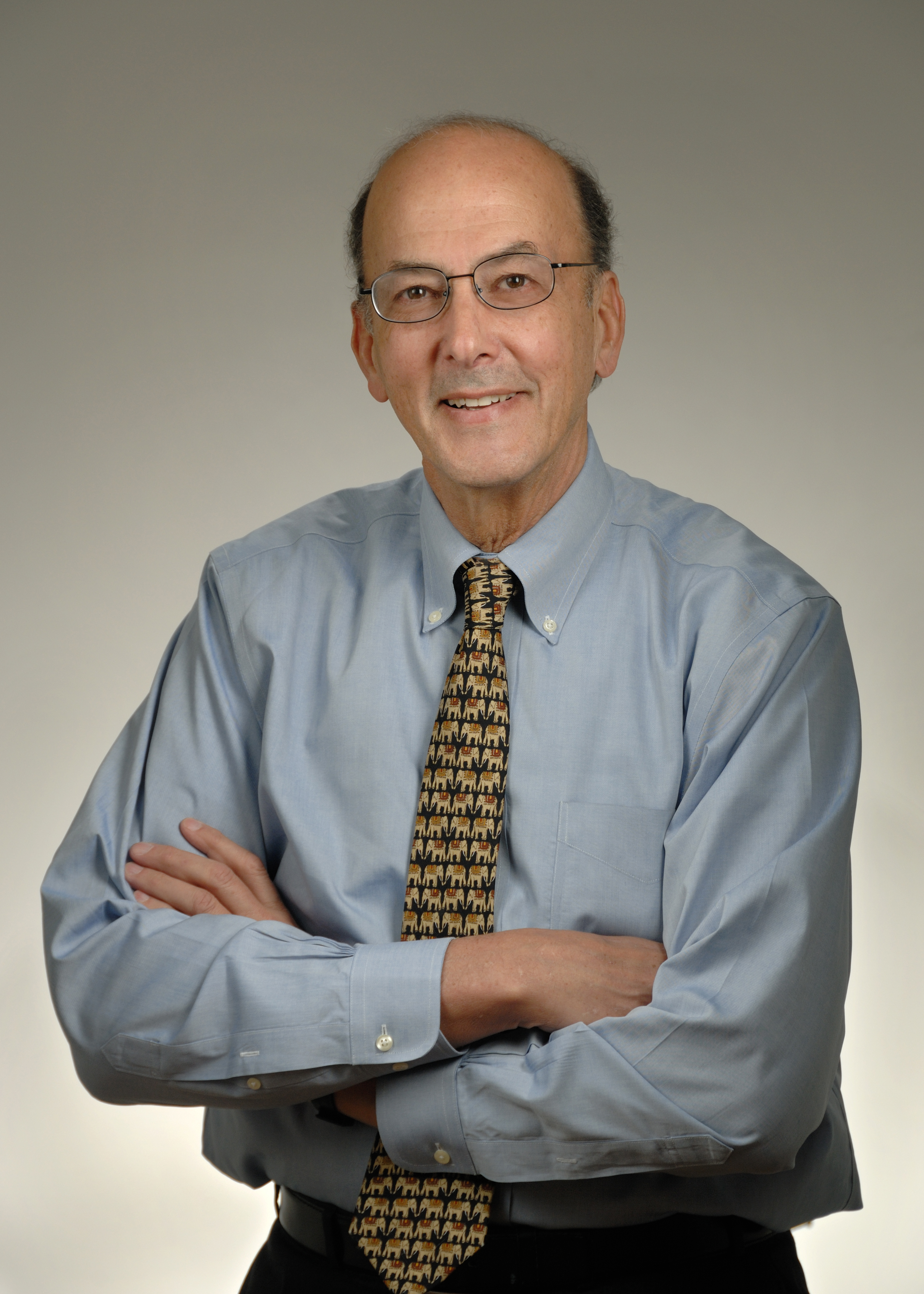

Former Director of the John E. Fogarty International Center
- Incumbent
- Assumed office March 31, 2006
- Preceded by: Gerald T. Keusch

Personal details
- Spouse: Barbara J. Stoll
- Children: 3
- Education: Harvard University (B.A., M.P.H., M.D.); University of Gothenburg (Ph.D.)
- Awards: Public Health Service Outstanding Service Medal; Albert B. Sabin Gold Medal

Military service
- Allegiance: United States
- Branch/service: USPHS Commissioned Corps
- Years of service: 1977–2006
- Scientific career
- Workplaces: Centers for Disease Control and Prevention; International Centre for Diarrhoeal Disease Research, Bangladesh; National Institutes of Health; Emory University School of Medicine
- Thesis: Epidemiologic studies of cholera in rural Bangladesh (1984)
- Doctoral advisor: Jan Holmgren

Roger I. Glass is an American physician-scientist who served as the Director of the John E. Fogarty International Center.

== Education and early career ==
Glass graduated from Harvard College in 1967, received a Fulbright Fellowship to study at the University of Buenos Aires in 1967, and received his M.D. from Harvard Medical School and his M.P.H. from the Harvard School of Public Health in 1972. He interned from 1972 to 1973 at Cambridge Hospital. He completed a residency in internal medicine at Mount Sinai Hospital from 1974 to 1976. At Sinai, Glass was also an instructor in the department of medicine and an epidemiology fellow with Thomas C. Chalmers. Glass joined the Centers for Disease Control and Prevention in 1977 as a medical officer with Philip J. Landrigan assigned to the Environmental Hazards Branch. He was a Scientist at the International Centre for Diarrhoeal Disease Research, Bangladesh (icddr,b) from 1979 to 1983 and returned to Sweden where he received his doctorate from the University of Gothenburg. His doctoral advisor was Jan Holmgren. His dissertation was titled Epidemiologic studies of cholera in rural Bangladesh.

== Career ==
From 1977 to 2006, Glass served as a medical director in the United States Public Health Service Commissioned Corps. In 1984, he joined the National Institutes of Health Laboratory of Infectious Diseases as a medical officer with Albert Kapikian on the molecular biology of rotavirus. In 1986, Glass returned to the CDC to become Chief of the Viral Gastroenteritis Unit at the National Center for Infectious Diseases. He was a clinical associate professor in the department of pediatrics at Emory University School of Medicine with André Nahmias. Glass was named Director of the Fogarty International Center and associate director for International Research by NIH Director Elias A. Zerhouni on March 31, 2006, and stepped down on January 14, 2023.

=== Research ===
Glass's research interests are in the prevention of gastroenteritis from rotaviruses and noroviruses through the application of novel scientific research. He has maintained field studies in India, Bangladesh, Brazil, Mexico, Israel, Russia, Vietnam, China and elsewhere. His research has been targeted toward epidemiologic studies to anticipate the introduction of rotavirus vaccines. He is fluent and often lectures in five languages. Glass has co-authored more than 600 research papers and chapters.

From 1979-1983, Dr. Glass worked at the International Center for Diarrheal Disease Research in Bangladesh to conduct the trial of a new cholera vaccine and engage in studies of diarrheal diseases. This experience ignited a lifelong interest in enteric disease research. He completed his PhD at the University of Goteborg, Sweden with Jan Holmgren on classic studies of the epidemiology of cholera that helped lay the groundwork for the currently licensed cholera vaccine used worldwide. He then spent 3 years at NIH focused on studies of the molecular biology of rotavirus, the most common cause of severe diarrhea and deaths in children, estimated in 1986 to cause some 872,000 childhood deaths per year. He returned to CDC to establish the Viral Gastroenteritis Unit (VGU) which became a global leader in the field. Their research helped define the national and global burden of rotavirus and norovirus gastroenteritis, assisted in trials of the first licensed RV vaccine, Rotashield and characterized a number of new viral agents of gastroenteritis – astroviruses, Groups B and C rotaviruses, picobirnavirus, sapoviruses and enteric adenoviruses. Their data on RV provided the evidence ACIP used in 1998 to recommend RV immunization for all American children. Nine months after Rotashield was introduced, a rare unanticipated adverse response, intussusception led to its withdrawal.

Recognizing the huge burden of RV deaths and hospitalizations in low and middle income countries (LMICs), his group received major support from WHO, CDC, and the Gates Foundation to both establish global RV surveillance and develop a new live oral RV vaccine in India that would be affordable for LMICs. In a lifelong partnership with Prof. M.K. Bhan at the All-India Institute of Medical Science, Bharat Biotech, a new vaccine company in India, NIH, the Government of India’s Department of Biotechnology, the BMGF and PATH, this team developed a new live oral RV vaccine, Rotavac, that was released in 2016 for use in all Indian children. In partnership with the Government of India and the BMGF, Bharat agreed to release this new vaccine for $1/dose, versus the $60-$100/dose price for vaccines available from western vaccine manufacturers. Rotavac is now available throughout India and through GAVI, in many countries in African and Asia.

Over a period of 20 years, the VGU group trained epidemiologists from CDC and research fellows from more than 45 countries to conduct rotavirus studies to encourage RV vaccine introduction in their countries and subsequently, to measure vaccine impact in terms of lives saved and hospitalizations decreased. In 2006, the CDC group again wrote the ACIP guidelines for the use of Rotavirus vaccines in the US and in 2009, WHO approved RV vaccines for use in all children worldwide. Despite the high cost of the vaccines produced by western manufacturers GSK and Merck, GAVI subsidized RV vaccine introduction in low-income countries. Today, low-cost and WHO approved Indian vaccines are currently the most widely used in LMICs. Partnerships between CDC epidemiologists and their international collaborators have gone on to define the positive cost-benefit of using RV vaccines country by country have documented the substantial decline in RV deaths and hospitalizations in many of the 140 countries currently using these vaccines.

== Personal life ==
Glass is married to Barbara J. Stoll and the father of three children Nina, Michael and Andy Glass. He speaks French, Spanish, Russian, Portuguese, Bengali, and English.

== Awards and honors ==
Glass has received numerous awards including the Charles C. Shepard Lifetime Scientific Achievement Award presented by the CDC in recognition of his 30-year career of scientific research application and leadership, the Dr. Charles Merieux Award from the National Foundation for Infectious Diseases for his work on rotavirus vaccines in the developing world. In 1994, he received the Public Health Service Outstanding Service Medal. Glass is also the recipient of the Albert B. Sabin Gold Medal, Georgetown University's Cura Personalis Award, Research!America's Geoffrey Beene Builders of Science Award, Rice University's Rice 360˚ Institute for Global Health Award, the Jimmy and Rosalynn Carter Humanitarian Award from the National Foundation for Infectious Diseases, and the Lifetime Achievement Award from the Consortium of Universities for Global Health. He is a member of the National Academy of Medicine.
