= Iquitos Satellite Laboratory =

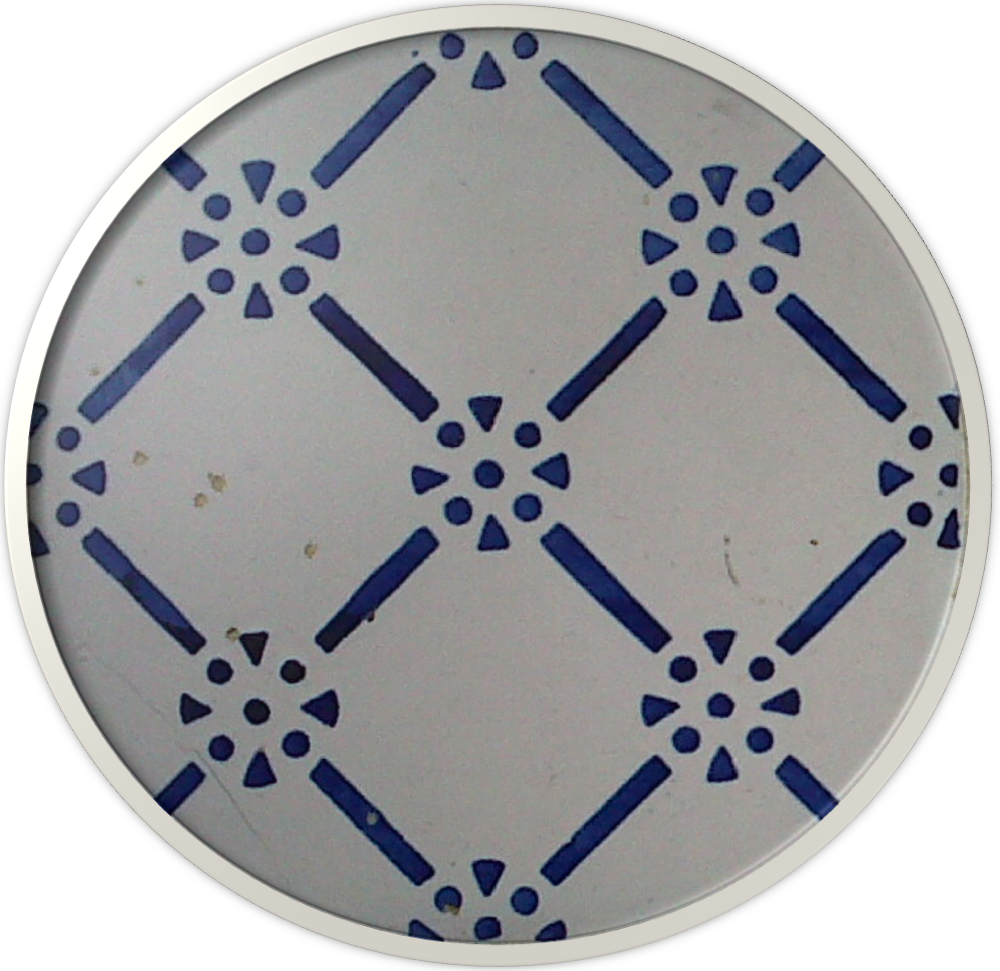
Iquitos Satellite Laboratory (IQTLAB) logo

The Iquitos Satellite Laboratory (IQTLAB) was established in 2002 in the city of Iquitos, Peru by doctor Margaret Kosek, biologist Maribel Paredes Olortegui, and nurse Pablo Peñataro Yori, with the collaboration of the Dr. Robert Gilman working group in Lima, Peru and the US Naval Medical Research Unit No. 6 (NAMRU-6) .

The Iquitos Satellite Laboratory (IQTLAB) is supported through National Institutes of Health, Centers for Disease Control and Prevention, Fogarty International Center, International Atomic Energy Agency, The University of Virginia and the Bill & Melinda Gates Foundation funded grants.

== Purpose ==
The mission of IQTLAB is to improve understanding of health problems among vulnerable populations in order to identify sustainable solutions that improve their health, social and economic conditions.

== Team Members ==
The IQTLAB team consists of experts from Asociación Benéfica Prisma, the University of Virginia, the Johns Hopkins Bloomberg School of Public Health, and the Tulane University School of Public Health and Tropical Medicine, among other universities and research institutions worldwide. IQTLAB utilizes a multidisciplinary approach that combines knowledge of the epidemiology of tropical infectious disease, malnutrition, intestinal infection, biostatistics, medical science, demography, ecology, and spatial data collection and analysis.

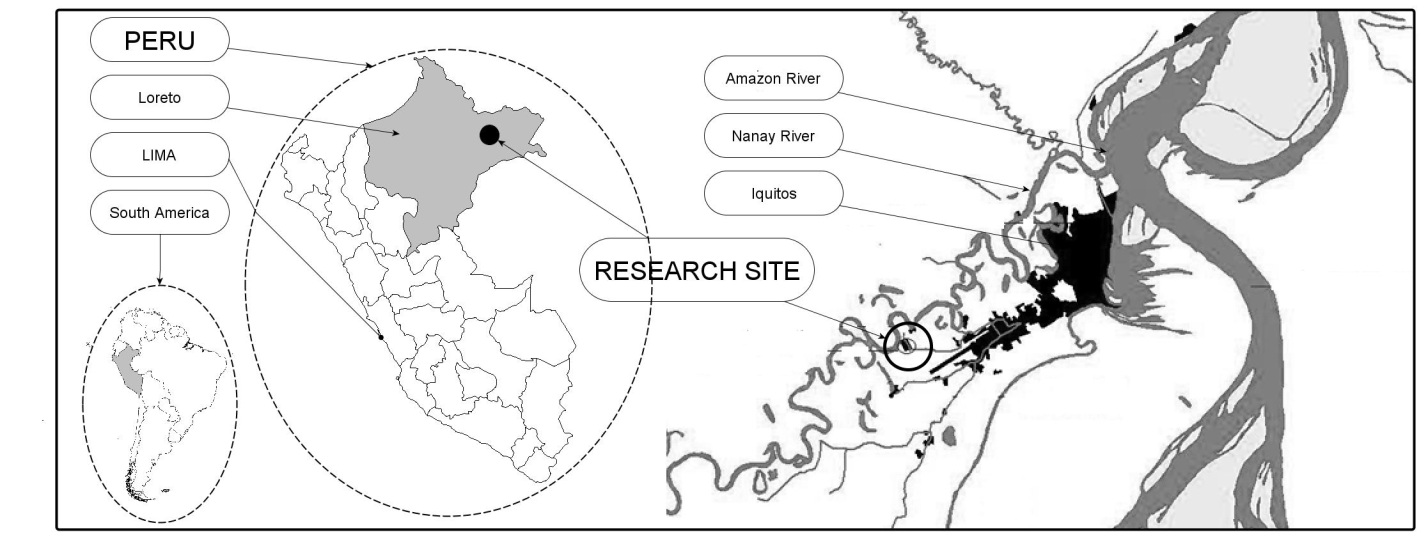
Map IQTLAB research site

The Iquitos Satellite Laboratory (IQTLAB) team is led by Margaret Kosek, MD, a professor of infectious disease at the University of Virginia Department of Medicine.

== Operations ==
IQTLAB Research site. Iquitos, Peru

The research center is approximately 4,000 square feet (370 m^{2}) and is capable of conducting sophisticated laboratory diagnostics and experiments in parasitology, microbiology, immunology, and molecular biology. In addition to the laboratory, IQTLAB provides a vast array of support for scientific data collection, including GPS/GIS data collection, survey data collection, satellite image processing, and climate conditions (strategic deployment of weather monitoring systems).

IQTLAB currently has a number of ongoing projects, including:

1. Etiology, risk factors and interactions of enteric infections and malnutrition and the consequences for child health and development
2. Probiotics for Pediatric Diarrhea in Peru
3. Epidemiology of campylobacters in the Peruvian Amazon
4. Epidemiology of shigellosis in the Peruvian Amazon
5. Serologic assessment of burden of diarrheal disease in children under 5 years old
6. Improved Biomarkers for the Assessment of Environmental Enteropathy
7. The development of a simple test for small bowel barrier dysfunction applicable to environmental enteropathy
8. Global Infectious Disease Training Grant
9. Enterics for Global Health EFGH
10. Acute Febrile Illness (AFI)

Since its foundation, the Iquitos Satellite Laboratory (IQTLAB) has been the host and support of national and international students from undergraduate to master and MD/PhD programs.

== Recent Peer Reviewed Articles ==
- Atlas HE, Conteh B, Islam MT, Jere KC, Omore R, Sanogo D, Schiaffino F, Yousafzai MT, Ahmed N, Awuor AO, Badji H, Cornick J, Feutz E, Galagan SR, Haidara FC, Horne B, Hossen MI, Hotwani A, Houpt ER, Jallow AF, Karim M, Keita AM, Keita Y, Khanam F, Liu J, Malemia T, Manneh A, McGrath CJ, Nasrin D, Ndalama M, Ochieng JB, Ogwel B, Paredes Olortegui M, Zegarra Paredes LF, Pinedo Vasquez T, Platts-Mills JA, Qudrat-E-Khuda S, Qureshi S, Hasan Rajib MN, Rogawski McQuade ET, Sultana S, Tennant SM, Tickell KD, Witte D, Peñataro Yori P, Cunliffe NA, Hossain MJ, Kosek MN, Kotloff KL, Qadri F, Qamar FN, Tapia MD, Pavlinac PB (March 2024). "Diarrhea Case Surveillance in the Enterics for Global Health Shigella Surveillance Study: Epidemiologic Methods". Open Forum Infect Dis. 11 (Suppl 1): S6–S16. doi:10.1093/ofid/ofad664. PMC 10962728. PMID 38532963.
- Morozoff C, Ahmed N, Chinkhumba J, Islam MT, Jallow AF, Ogwel B, Zegarra Paredes LF, Sanogo D, Atlas HE, Badji H, Bar-Zeev N, Conteh B, Güimack Fajardo M, Feutz E, Haidara FC, Karim M, Mamby Keita A, Keita Y, Khanam F, Kosek MN, Kotloff KL, Maguire R, Mbutuka IS, Ndalama M, Ochieng JB, Okello C, Omore R, Perez Garcia KF, Qamar FN, Qudrat-E-Khuda S, Qureshi S, Rajib MN, Shapiama Lopez WV, Sultana S, Witte D, Yousafzai MT, Awuor AO, Cunliffe NA, Jahangir Hossain M, Paredes Olortegui M, Tapia MD, Zaman K, Means AR (March 2024). "Quantifying the Cost of Shigella Diarrhea in the Enterics for Global Health (EFGH) Shigella Surveillance Study". Open Forum Infect Dis. 11 (Suppl 1): S41–7. doi:10.1093/ofid/ofad575. PMC 10962725. PMID 38532961.
- Liu J, Garcia Bardales PF, Islam K, Jarju S, Juma J, Mhango C, Naumanga Q, Qureshi S, Sonye C, Ahmed N, Aziz F, Bhuiyan MT, Charles M, Cunliffe NA, Abdou M, Galagan SR, Gitteh E, Guindo I, Jahangir Hossain M, Jabang AM, Jere KC, Kawonga F, Keita M, Keita NY, Kotloff KL, Shapiama Lopez WV, Munga S, Paredes Olortegui M, Omore R, Pavlinac PB, Qadri F, Qamar FN, Azadul Alam Raz SM, Riziki L, Schiaffino F, Stroup S, Traore SN, Pinedo Vasquez T, Yousafzai MT, Antonio M, Cornick JE, Kabir F, Khanam F, Kosek MN, Ochieng JB, Platts-Mills JA, Tennant SM, Houpt ER (March 2024). "Shigella Detection and Molecular Serotyping With a Customized TaqMan Array Card in the Enterics for Global Health (EFGH): Shigella Surveillance Study". Open Forum Infect Dis. 11 (Suppl 1): S34–S40. doi:10.1093/ofid/ofad574. PMC 10962731. PMID 38532960.
- Benedicto-Matambo P, Avolio LN, Badji H, Batool R, Khanam F, Munga S, Tapia MD, Peñataro Yori P, Awuor AO, Ceesay BE, Cornick J, Cunliffe NA, Garcia Bardales PF, Heaney CD, Hotwani A, Ireen M, Taufiqul Islam M, Jallow O, Kaminski RW, Shapiama Lopez WV, Maiden V, Ikumapayi UN, Nyirenda R, Ochieng JB, Omore R, Paredes Olortegui M, Pavlinac PB, Pisanic N, Qadri F, Qureshi S, Rahman N, Rogawski McQuade ET, Schiaffino F, Secka O, Sonye C, Sultana S, Timite D, Traore A, Yousafzai MT, Taufiqur Rahman Bhuiyan M, Jahangir Hossain M, Jere KC, Kosek MN, Kotloff KL, Qamar FN, Sow SO, Platts-Mills JA (March 2024). "Exploring Natural Immune Responses to Shigella Exposure Using Multiplex Bead Assays on Dried Blood Spots in High-Burden Countries: Protocol From a Multisite Diarrhea Surveillance Study". Open Forum Infect Dis. 11 (Suppl 1): S58–S64. doi:10.1093/ofid/ofad650. PMC 10962721. PMID 38532958.
- Babb C, Badji H, Bhuiyan MT, Cornick J, Qureshi S, Sonye C, Shapiama Lopez WV, Adnan M, Atlas HE, Begum K, Brennhofer SA, Ceesay BE, Ceesay AK, Cunliffe NA, Garcia Bardales PF, Haque S, Horne B, Hossain MJ, Iqbal J, Islam MT, Islam S, Khanam F, Kotloff KL, Malemia T, Manzanares Villanueva K, Million GM, Munthali V, Ochieng JB, Ogwel B, Paredes Olortegui M, Omore R, Pavlinac PB, Platts-Mills JA, Sears KT, Secka O, Tennant SM, Peñataro Yori P, Yousafzai MT, Jere KC, Kosek MN, Munga S, Ikumapayi UN, Qadri F, Qamar FN, Rogawski McQuade ET (March 2024). "Evaluation of Fecal Inflammatory Biomarkers to Identify Bacterial Diarrhea Episodes: Systematic Review and Protocol for the Enterics for Global Health Shigella Surveillance Study". Open Forum Infect Dis. 11 (Suppl 1): S65–S75. doi:10.1093/ofid/ofad652. PMC 10962755. PMID 38532957.
- Dodd R, Awuor AO, Garcia Bardales PF, Khanam F, Mategula D, Onwuchekwa U, Sarwar G, Yousafzai MT, Ahmed N, Atlas HE, Amirul Islam Bhuiyan M, Colston JM, Conteh B, Diawara M, Dilruba N, Elwood S, Fatima I, Feutz E, Galagan SR, Haque S, Taufiqul Islam M, Karim M, Keita B, Kosek MN, Kotloff KL, Lefu C, Mballow M, Ndalama M, Ndeketa L, Ogwel B, Okonji C, Paredes Olortegui M, Pavlinac PB, Pinedo Vasquez T, Platts-Mills JA, Qadri F, Qureshi S, Rogawski McQuade ET, Sultana S, Traore MO, Cunliffe NA, Jahangir Hossain M, Omore R, Qamar FN, Tapia MD, Peñataro Yori P, Zaman K, McGrath CJ (March 2024). "Population Enumeration and Household Utilization Survey Methods in the Enterics for Global Health (EFGH): Shigella Surveillance Study". Open Forum Infect Dis. 11 (Suppl 1): S17–S24. doi:10.1093/ofid/ofae018. PMC 10962723. PMID 38532956.
- Feutz E, Biswas PK, Ndeketa L, Ogwel B, Onwuchekwa U, Sarwar G, Sultana S, Peñataro Yori P, Acebedo A, Ahmed N, Ahmed I, Atlas HE, Awuor AO, Bhuiyan MA, Conteh B, Diawara O, Elwood S, Fane M, Hossen MI, Ireen M, Jallow AF, Karim M, Kosek MN, Kotloff KL, Lefu C, Liu J, Maguire R, Qamar FN, Ndalama M, Ochieng JB, Okonji C, Paredes LF, Pavlinac PB, Perez K, Qureshi S, Schiaffino F, Traore M, Tickell KD, Wachepa R, Witte D, Cornick J, Jahangir Hossain M, Khanam F, Olortegui MP, Omore R, Sow SO, Yousafzai MT, Galagan SR (March 2024). "Data Management in Multicountry Consortium Studies: The Enterics For Global Health (EFGH) Shigella Surveillance Study Example". Open Forum Infect Dis. 11 (Suppl 1): S48–S57. doi:10.1093/ofid/ofad573. PMC 10962719. PMID 38532952.
- Manzanares Villanueva K, Pinedo Vasquez T, Peñataro Yori P, Romaina Cacique L, Garcia Bardales PF, Shapiama Lopez WV, Zegarra Paredes F, Perez KF, Rengifo Pinedo S, Silva Delgado H, Flynn T, Schiaffino F, Colston JM, Paredes Olortegui MP, Kosek MN (March 2024). "The Enterics for Global Health (EFGH) Shigella Surveillance Study in Peru". Open Forum Infect Dis. 11 (Suppl 1): S121–8. doi:10.1093/ofid/ofad655. PMC 10962730. PMID 38532951.
- Horne B, Badji H, Bhuiyan MT, Romaina Cachique L, Cornick J, Hotwani A, Juma J, Ochieng JB, Abdou M, Apondi E, Atlas HE, Awuor AO, Baker KS, Ceesay BE, Charles M, Cunliffe NA, Feutz E, Galagan SR, Guindo I, Hossain MJ, Iqbal J, Jallow F, Keita NY, Khanam F, Kotloff KL, Maiden V, Manzanares Villanueva K, Mito O, Mosharraf MP, Nkeze J, Ikumapayi UN, Paredes Olortegui M, Pavlinac PB, Pinedo Vasquez T, Qadri F, Qamar FN, Qureshi S, Rahman N, Sangare A, Sen S, Peñataro Yori P, Yousafzai MT, Ahmed D, Jere KC, Kosek MN, Omore R, Permala-Booth J, Secka O, Tennant SM (March 2024). "Microbiological Methods Used in the Enterics for Global Health Shigella Surveillance Study". Open Forum Infect Dis. 11 (Suppl 1): S25–S33. doi:10.1093/ofid/ofad576. PMC 10962722. PMID 38532949.

== See also ==
- International Atomic Energy Agency
- Asociacion Benefica Prisma
- Enterics for Global Health
