= Wilton Hall =

Wilton Hall may refer to:

- Wilton E. Hall (1901–1980), United States senator
- Wilton Hall, a moated site at Wilton, Ryedale, North Yorkshire, England
- Wilton Hall, a building near Bletchley, Milton Keynes, Buckinghamshire, England

== See also ==
- William Hall (disambiguation)
