= Anders Vahlne =

Swedish Virologist

- Born: 25 May 1946 (age 80)
- Occupation: Virologist
- Known for: HIV and virology

Academic background
- Education: University of Gothenburg
- Thesis: Studies on interactions of herpes simplex virus and neural cells

Anders Vahlne (born 1946) is a Swedish virologist and professor emeritus at the Karolinska Institute. He is best known for his research in HIV and herpes simplex virus. He is centre director of the Global Virus Network (GVN), an international coalition of virologists aimed at addressing viral challenges and outbreaks across the world.

== Early life and education ==
Anders was born in 1946 in Lund, Sweden, to professor Gösta Vahlne and Anna-Lisa Vahlne. He pursued medical studies at the University of Gothenburg, where he earned his Doctor of Medicine degree in 1973 and later a Doctor of Philosophy (PhD) in 1978 with a thesis titled, Studies on interactions of herpes simplex virus and neural cells.

== Career ==
Vahlne began his career as a laboratory physician at the Department of Clinical Virology at the University of Gothenburg, where he worked from 1973 to 1985. He later became the deputy director of the department from 1985 to 1993.

In 1994 he joined the Karolinska Institutet as a professor of clinical virology. His research focuses on HIV and herpes virus, with notable work on HIV-1 capsid assembly and antiviral therapies.

== COVID-19 pandemic ==
During the COVID-19 pandemic, Vahlne frequently served as an expert commentator in Swedish national media. In March 2020, he warned that Stockholm's clinical laboratories faced shortages of PCR test kits and reagents.

In April 2021, he discussed the spread of the SARS-CoV-2 P.1 ("Brazilian") variant in Sweden on TV4, describing it as highly transmissible and potentially affecting antibody responses.

In November 2021, he criticised the decision to scale down free PCR testing for vaccinated individuals, arguing that reduced testing risked increased transmission and a "fourth wave."

Vahlne also served as chair of the Swedish research group Vetenskapsforum covid-19 during the pandemic and appeared in media in that role.

He contributed a chapter to the open-access volume Sweden’s Pandemic Experiment (Routledge, 2022), analysing virological aspects of Sweden’s response.

== Global Virus Network ==
Vahlne is a key figure in the Global Virus Network (GVN), where he serves as centre director and member of the board of directors. GVN, which was co-founded in 2011 by Professors Robert Gallo, William Hall and Reinhard Kurth, is an international collaborative network of virologists dedicated to research and prevention of viral diseases. The GVN brings together leading researchers to address global viral threats, including emerging pandemics like COVID-19, as well as long-standing challenges such as HIV and other viral infections. Vahlne's involvement has focused on advancing the network's mission of sharing research, training virologists, and coordinating global responses to viral outbreaks.

== Research ==
One of Vahlne's early works investigated the differences in attachment mechanisms between herpes simplex virus type 1 (HSV-1) and type 2 (HSV-2) to neurons and glial cells. This study, published in Infection and Immunity in 1980, explored the molecular interactions between viruses and host cells and contributed to the understanding of herpesvirus neurotropism.

Vahlne also conducted research on auditory brain stem response abnormalities in patients with Bell's palsy, as reported in a 1983 study published in Otolaryngology–Head and Neck Surgery . This research examined neurological complications associated with viral infections, particularly in relation to the peripheral nervous system.

In the 1990s, Vahlne's research extended to retroviruses, with a focus on human T-cell leukemia viruses (HTLV) and HIV-1. In a 1991 study published in Science, Vahlne and colleagues identified deleted HTLV-I provirus in blood and cutaneous lesions of patients with mycosis fungoides, offering insights into the viral mechanisms associated with this condition. During this period, Vahlne also worked on identifying continuous epitopes of the HIV-1 transmembrane glycoprotein. His research, published in the Journal of Virology , contributed to the understanding of how human sera react to different HIV-1 isolates and supported the development of synthetic peptides for diagnostic purposes.

In addition, Vahlne was involved in a 1991 study on the identification of type-specific linear epitopes in the glycoproteins gp46 and gp21 of HTLV types I and II, published in the Proceedings of the National Academy of Sciences . This work was relevant for advancing diagnostics and therapeutic strategies against HTLV.

In 1996, Vahlne co-authored a study published in the American Journal of Human Genetics that used mitochondrial DNA variation to suggest that Mongolia may have been the source of the founding population of the New World. This research intersected molecular biology with anthropological studies and provided insights into human population migration patterns.

== Selected Publications ==
- Merriwether DA, Hall WW, Vahlne A, Ferrell RE. "mtDNA variation indicates Mongolia may have been the source for the founding population for the New World." American Journal of Human Genetics. 1996 Jul;59(1):204-12.
- Horal P, Svennerholm B, Jeansson S, Rymo L, Hall WW, Vahlne A. "Continuous epitopes of the human immunodeficiency virus type 1 (HIV-1) transmembrane glycoprotein and reactivity of human sera to synthetic peptides representing various HIV-1 isolates." Journal of Virology. 1991 May;65(5):2718-23. doi:10.1128/JVI.65.5.2718-2723.1991.
- Hall WW, Liu CR, Schneewind O, Takahashi H, Kaplan MH, Röupe G, Vahlne A. "Deleted HTLV-I provirus in blood and cutaneous lesions of patients with mycosis fungoides." Science. 1991 Jul 19;253(5017):317-20. doi:10.1126/science.1857968.
- Horal P, Hall WW, Svennerholm B, Lycke J, Jeansson S, Rymo L, Kaplan MH, Vahlne A. "Identification of type-specific linear epitopes in the glycoproteins gp46 and gp21 of human T-cell leukemia viruses type I and type II using synthetic peptides." PNAS. 1991 Jul 1;88(13):5754-8. doi:10.1073/pnas.88.13.5754.
- Rosenhall U, Edström S, Hanner P, Badr G, Vahlne A. "Auditory brain stem response abnormalities in patients with Bell's palsy." Otolaryngology–Head and Neck Surgery. 1983 Aug;91(4):412-6. doi:10.1177/019459988309100413.
- Vahlne A, Svennerholm B, Sandberg M, Hamberger A, Lycke E. "Differences in attachment between herpes simplex type 1 and type 2 viruses to neurons and glial cells." Infection and Immunity. 1980 Jun;28(3):675-80. doi:10.1128/iai.28.3.675-680.1980.
