= Willie Hall =

Willie Hall may refer to:

- Willie Hall (pianist) (died 1930), nicknamed "Drive'em Down", American keyboardist
- Willie Hall (drummer) (born 1950), American drummer
- Willie Hall (American football) (born 1949), American football player
- Willie Hall (English footballer) (1912–1967), Tottenham Hotspur and England international footballer
- Will Hall (writer) (born 1966), mental health advocate, writer, and counselor

== See also ==
- Willis Hall, English playwright
- Wilbur Hall (musician), US trombonist, violinist, and vaudevillian
- Willard Hall, Delaware politician
- Willard Preble Hall, former provisional governor of Missouri
- William Hall (disambiguation)
