= John B. Robbins =

American medical researcher (1932–2019)

John Bennett Robbins (December 1, 1932—November 27, 2019) was a senior investigator at the National Institutes of Health (NIH), best known for his contribution to the development of the vaccine against bacterial meningitis (Haemophilus influenzae type b )Hib)) with his colleague Rachel Schneerson. He conducted research on the Bethesda, Maryland campus of the NIH from 1970 until his retirement at the age of 80 in 2012. During his tenure, he worked in the Eunice Kennedy Shriver National Institute of Child Health and Human Development (NICHD) and the Food and Drug Administration’s biologics laboratories on location.

== Education and career ==
John Bennett Robbins was born December 1, 1932 in Brooklyn, New York to parents Harry Robbins and Matilda (née Bender) Robbins, owners of the Cornell Paper and Box Company in the borough’s Red Hook area. Harry Robbins’ father, Philip Rabinowitz was a Soviet emigrant as the last of a line of prominent rabbis from Minsk, in modern-day Belarus. Rabinowitz lost his American rabbinical post for publicly supporting labor unions, an issue of contention for some members of his congregation. By the time John was born, Harry had changed his name to Robbins after facing discrimination and violence from coworkers. “It’s O.K. to be Jewish, but you don’t have to die for it,” Dr. Robbins had quoted his father as saying.

Robbins received his undergraduate and medical degrees from New York University followed by his residency at Massachusetts General Hospital as well as graduate training in infectious disease and immunology from the University of Florida. While he was trained as a pediatrician, he turned to research with work at the Weizmann Institute of Science in Israel before moving back to New York. He held the position of associate professor of Pediatrics and Immunology at Albert Einstein College of Medicine in New York for 3 years before beginning his career at the NICHD as a part of the NIH in 1970. In 1969, Robbins met Rachel Schneerson, a Polish Immigrant who had trained in Israel and had arrived in New York to be an instructor in the Department of Pediatrics and the Laboratory of Immunology at Albert Einstein College of Medicine. The two became a research team, “dedicated to developing vaccines to protect children from bacterial diseases.”

Robbins and Schneerson came to the NICHD in 1970 after being recruited by the Institute's then Scientific Director Charles Lowe. In 1974, the two went to the Division of Bacterial Products, where Robbins was named chief of the division, at the Bureau of Biologics within the U.S. Food and Drug Administration. They returned to the NICHD in 1983 to head the Laboratory of Developmental and Molecular Immunity within the Division of Intramural Research. In 1998, Schneerson and Robbins were named heads of the Section on Bacterial Disease Pathogenesis and Immunity. The two continued leading the lab until their retirement in July 2012.

== Hib before the vaccine ==
Hib bacteria got their name because of their initial isolation during the 1889 flu pandemic, where they were believed to be the cause of influenza until further research in 1933. However, the flu is a virus and Hib is a common secondary infection that may be lethal if it reaches the bloodstream or brain. Other outcomes of an Hib discovery include some of the scourges of childhood illness—including bacterial meningitis and its attendant intellectual disabilities and deafness—as well as epiglottitis, arthritis, osteomyelitis and pneumonia. In those years, it was estimated that Hib and related illnesses cost more than $2 billion each year.

== The Vaccine ==
Robbins's vaccine protects infants from bacterial meningitis caused by Hib which increases the risk factor of acquired permanent brain damage, deafness, or death. Hib as a form of meningitis before the vaccine was estimated by the World Health Organization to kill 400,000 children per year with case numbers of 13,000 children infected in the United States with numbers once valued at 1,000 infants killed per day. Since the Hib conjugate vaccine was licensed in 1989, it has saved an estimated seven million lives worldwide, with the occurrence and mortality of Hib among young children dropping as much as 95-99% with distribution to 190 countries.

Initially vaccines against bacterial diseases were often made from whole bacteria or their toxins that had to be killed or weakened. They could be dangerous: Some occasionally induced high fevers that could trigger convulsions. Worse, if a manufacturing failure left any full-strength bacteria alive, children could die. Not Robbins's. His were made of just the surface polysaccharides (sugars), which were safer. And where previous vaccines rarely worked in children under age 2, who were the most susceptible to bacterial diseases, Dr. Robbins's conjugate Hib vaccine protected babies as soon as two months.

Since 1970, Professor Porter W. Anderson Jr. and Dr. David H. Smith of Harvard University alongside Dr. Robbins and Dr. Rachel Schneerson of the NICH researched the mechanisms of disease and vaccine development for Hib through the NIH. These two teams worked independently while comparing their findings, discovering that the key to an effective Hib vaccine was the development of a polysaccharide-protein conjugate in which the polysaccharide capsule of the Hib bacterium is chemically bound to a protein antigen. Both groups carried the vaccine development from initial discovery to the successful marketing of a medical product.

The research teams were the first to introduce the polysaccharide vaccine which is based on a sugar molecule derived from a part of the Hib capsule. Robbins and Schneerson believed that they could induce immunity by injecting a single antigen—the polysaccharide (sugar) from the surface of the bacteria—into children. Few others believed this process could work because the accepted belief at the time was that proteins, not sugars, were immunogens. Vaccine research at the time focused on using whole bacteria that had been killed, or of weakened bacteria, that could sometimes cause severe side effects. It was, however, shown that this vaccine was not effective among children younger than 18 months old, the group most at risk of contracting the disease. This is in part due to the fact that polysaccharides are a weak inducer to boost immunity. They then developed conjugate vaccines, a technique that linked a protein with the polysaccharide to strengthen its immune inducing capacity.

Studies in animals, adult humans, and children documented that injecting the polysaccharide alone could induce protective levels of antibodies to Hib. Using polysaccharides also eliminated many of the severe side effects of killed-bacteria vaccines. Scientists supported by the National Institute of Allergy and Infectious Diseases did further vaccine testing. With the added involvement of industry, three Hib-purified polysaccharide vaccines were produced and licensed in 1985. But among infants, whose immune systems were immature, the level of protection was too low and the vaccine didn't prevent Hib. Many scientists believed that a polysaccharide-based vaccine would never work because immature defenses of the infant's immune system were not savvy enough to detect the polysaccharide and make antibodies.

Robbins and Schneerson tried a new process: They linked the weak polysaccharide to a protein carrier on the bacterium's outer capsule, one that was easily recognized by the immature immune system of infants, to boost its antigenicity. Conjugated pairs of proteins and sugars are much more visible to infants’ immature immune systems and help them generate protective antibodies. This team had developed a clinically acceptable method of binding the Hib polysaccharide to a medically useful protein, tetanus toxoid. This novel process—called a “conjugate” vaccine—worked. This discovery is now used to strengthen vaccines against typhoid fever, whooping cough, E. coli bacteria, Clostridioides difficile and anthrax. The conjugate vaccine for Hib produced high antibody levels, well above what was needed for protection, among infants from injections starting at age 2 months and persisting for years beyond.

In 1972, Anderson and Smith collaborated with the Children's Hospital Medical Center in Boston and the University of Rochester to make the first polysaccharide-conjugate vaccines to be tested in adults and infants. All awards given to Robbins and Schneerson mention the importance of the Anderson-Smith team in the overall success of the vaccine.

The Hib vaccine has reduced the incidence of Hib meningitis by 98 percent in less than 10 years once it was licensed by the U.S. Food and Drug Administration and became part of the standard immunization series for infants in 1987. Most pediatricians trained since 1995 have never seen a Hib case. In countries where the vaccine is used, including the United States, Hib is no longer a cause of acquired intellectual disability. No other vaccine has ever shown such a rapid and dramatic effect in virtually eliminating a fatal disease. Today in the United States, the odds of finding Hib in children under the age of five is 1:1,000,000.

Hib conjugate vaccine which is now used throughout the world. The use of this vaccine led to a dramatic decline in the number of infants and children suffering from meningitis and other systemic infections such as osteomyelitis and pneumonia. Dr. Robbins also played an important role in the development of vaccines for typhoid fever, pertussis and many others.

== Similar Research and Applications ==
Alongside Drs. Anderson, Robbins, and Schneerson (Dr. Smith died in 1999), Dr. Mathuram Santosham of Johns Hopkins University studied the epidemiology of Hib. Dr. Santosham demonstrated clinically that Hib was preventable by immunization and conducted several vaccine trials, which included Hib conjugate vaccines. The results of his studies had a great impact on encouraging the use of Hib conjugate vaccines for all children. Later, he became the leader of the Hib Initiative funded by the Global Alliance for Vaccines and Immunization (GAVI). This project has supported the Hib conjugate vaccine as a part of national immunization programs in up to 190 countries.

After the success of the Hib vaccine, Robbins and Schneerson continued their work on single antigens and conjugate vaccines. Their efforts led to the development and licensing of vaccines against pertussis (whooping cough), typhoid, Staphylococcus infections (pneumonia, aureus, and Group B), certain types of malaria, and anthrax.

Additional information about their more recent research is available at

Professional Awards:

- Albert Lasker Clinical Medical Research Award in 1996 for “groundbreaking work and bold, visionary and imaginative leadership in the development and commercialization of the Haemophilus influenzae type b vaccine and bringing the vaccine to market, leading to the eradication of Haemophilus influenzae type B, typhoid, and pneumococcus.”
- World Health Organization Children's Vaccine Initiative Pasteur Award for “Recent Contributions in Vaccine Development for the landmark development of a polysaccharide-protein conjugate vaccine for Haemophilus influenzae type b (Hib).”
- Albert B. Sabin Gold Medal (named for the creator of the oral polio vaccine) in 2001 as a distinguished member of the public health community who has made extraordinary contributions in the field of vaccinology or a complementary field.
- The Prince Mahidol Award in the Field of Public Health in 2017 recognized the successful efforts of Professor Anderson, Dr. Robbins and Dr. Schneerson in developing the Hib vaccine, from research in polysaccharides to conjugate vaccines which is now being used as a standard for vaccination.
- Inductee of the National Academy of Science
- Inductee of the American Philosophical Society

== Death ==
Two weeks before his death, a conjugate typhoid vaccine rollout provided 10 million inoculations to children in Pakistan. John Robbins died November 27, 2019, at his home in Manhattan following a battle with prostate cancer. He is survived by his wife, Joan (Cannon) Robbins, a biochemist for the FDA; sons Robert Robbins (Alliance Artist Management), Daniel Robbins, a CPA and founder of TCI Business Capital, Dr. David Robbins MD OBGYN; daughter Ellen Taxman MBA; brother Marc; nine grandchildren; and two great-grandchildren.
