= Albert B. Sabin Gold Medal =

- Country: United States
- Presented by: Sabin Vaccine Institute
- Reward: medal
- First award: 1994
- Final award: 2026
- Currently held by: Uğur Şahin and Özlem Türeci
- Website: www.sabin.org/sabin-gold-medal-award

Since 1994, the Albert B. Sabin Gold Medal has been awarded annually by the Sabin Vaccine Institute in recognition of work in the field of vaccinology or a complementary field. It is named in honor of the pioneering work of Albert B. Sabin.

== Recipients ==
List of recipients
Year	Recipient	Related work
2025	Katherine O'Brien	Work in large-scale vaccine studies and clinical trials, contributing to the global licensure and access to vaccines for pneumococcal disease, rotovirus, and respiratory syncytial virus.
2024	Keith P. Klugman, Shabir A. Madhi	work demonstrating the efficacy of vaccines to protect children and pregnant women in LMICs.
2023	Thomas P. Monath	work on several innovative vaccines including those for Ebola Zaire, smallpox, West Nile virus, Zika and influenza.
2022	Kathrin Jansen	Commitment to advancing vaccine research and development (R&D) for a range of challenging diseases from COVID-19 to HPV and pneumonia.
2021	Barney S. Graham	work in research, development, and advocacy of vaccinations, including key contributions to COVID-19 vaccines
2020	Gordon Dougan	work in research, development, and advocacy of vaccinations
2019	Carol J. Baker	group B Streptococcus vaccine research and advocacy of immunization for expectant mothers
2018	Paul Offit	oral rotavirus vaccine work, leadership in promoting immunization
2017	Jan Holmgren	oral vaccine research, mucosal immunology, first effective oral vaccine for cholera
2016	George R. Siber	pneumococcus vaccine, H. influenzae type b vaccine, meningococcus vaccine
2015	Roger I. Glass	work on preventing gastroenteritis caused by rotaviruses and noroviruses
2014	Mathuram Santosham	work on preventing H. influenzae type b
2013	Anne A. Gershon	work on preventing childhood disease
2012	F. Marc LaForce	work on eliminating meningitis in Africa
2011	Douglas R. Lowy and John T. Schiller	work on cancer prevention vaccines
2010	John D. Clemens	work on using vaccines to reduce suffering and promote peace
2009	Rino Rappuoli	discovery of reverse vaccinology
2008	Ruth S. Nussenzweig	work on researching malaria
2007	Hilary Koprowski	work in biomedical research in the 20th century
2006	William H. Foege	work on improving childhood survival rates
2005	Albert Z. Kapikian	research on human gastroenteritis virus
2004	William S. Jordan, Jr.	work on vaccine research
2003	Samuel L. Katz	work on vaccines for pediatric infectious diseases
2002	Stanley A. Plotkin	work on wiping out rubella
2001	John B. Robbins	reducing childhood mortality from multiple diseases
2000	Ciro A. de Quadros	work on worldwide eradication of smallpox and polio in the Western Hemisphere
1999	Philip K. Russell	work on infectious disease
1998	Allen C. Steere	discovery of Lyme disease and further research on Lyme disease
1998	Myron M. Levine	education and mentorship
1997	Maurice R. Hilleman	worked on development of "more vaccines than any other person in history"
1996	Joseph L. Melnick	education and vaccine research
1995	Robert M. Chanock	identification of respiratory syncytial virus
1994	Donald A. Henderson	direction of WHO campaign to eradicate smallpox

== See also ==
- List of medicine awards
