= George Siber =

Medical researcher and vaccine expert

George R. Siber
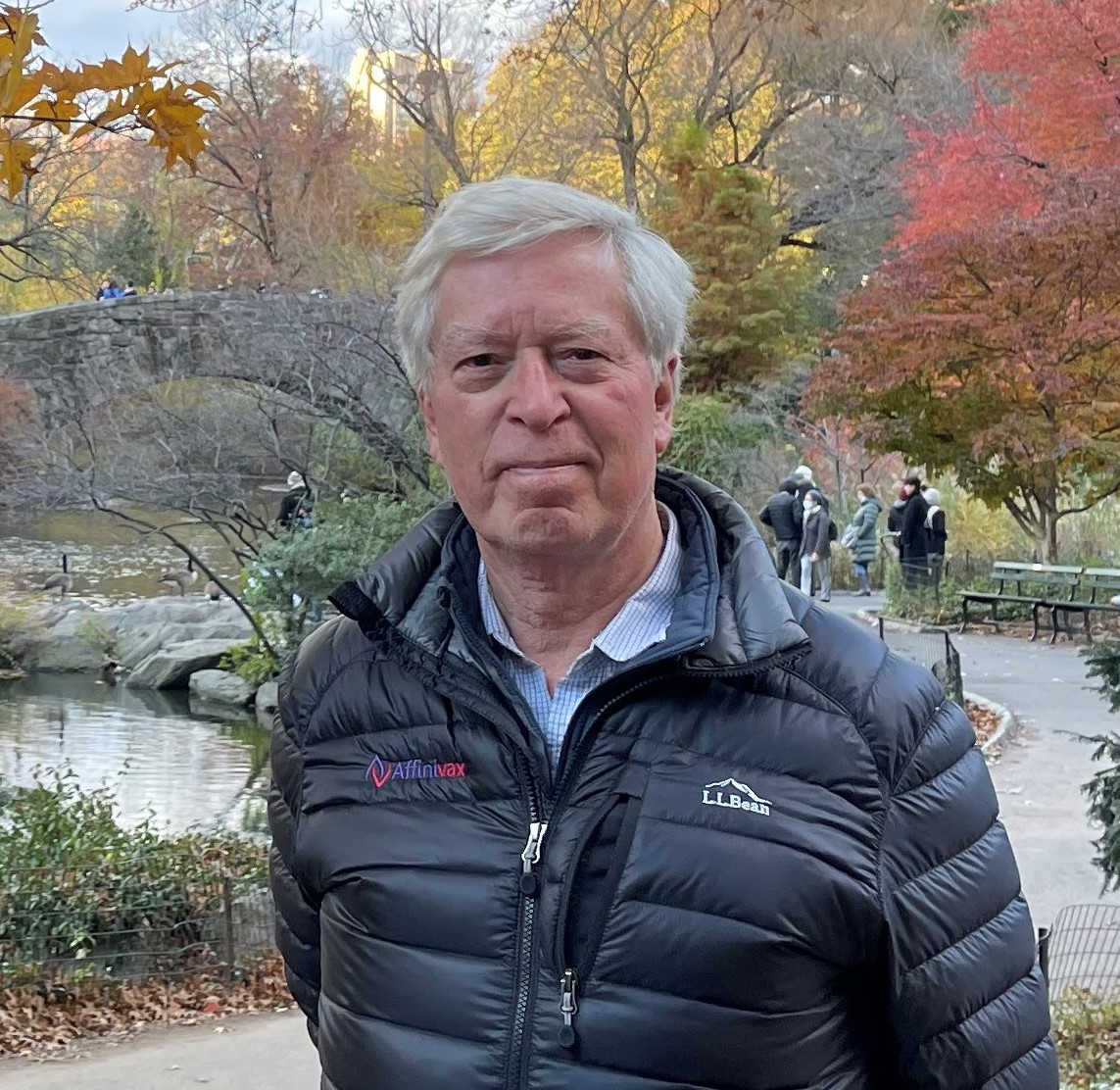
- Born: September 7, 1944; Bavaria
- Citizenship: Canadian and American (dual)
- Education: McGill University
- Spouse: Angelia Siber (m. 2006)
- Scientific career
- Fields: Vaccinology
- Doctoral advisor: David Hamilton Smith and Porter W Anderson Jr.

George Siber is a Canadian-American medical researcher and vaccinologist.

He is known for developing vaccines, therapeutic antibodies, and diagnostic agents for infectious diseases.

Siber is a former Harvard professor, current adjunct professor at Johns Hopkins University and former professor at the University of Massachusetts Medical School.

== Biography ==
Siber emigrated from Bavaria, Germany, with his parents at age nine in 1953 to Montreal.

After high school, he attended Bishop's University in Lennoxville, Quebec from 1962 to 1966, where he graduated with honors and obtained a Bachelor of Science. Siber then attended McGill University in Montreal, Quebec, Canada, where he became a Doctor of Medicine in 1970.

After graduation in 1970, Siber held several internships, residencies, and fellowships. Between 1970 and 1972, Siber worked in Chicago as an intern and junior medical resident at Rush University Medical Center. In 1972, Siber moved to Boston and worked as a senior medical resident and clinical fellow in medicine at Beth Israel Hospital until 1973. Between 1974 and 1975, Siber completed a fellowship in Infectious Diseases at Boston Children’s Hospital and Beth Israel Hospital. Siber was also a fellow for the Medical Research Council of Canada.

Siber served as the vice president, chief scientific officer, and senior vice president, and executive vice president for Wyeth from 1996 to 2006. After retiring from Wyeth, Siber served on the Board of Directors and Scientific Advisory Boards of multiple vaccine companies. Siber joined ClearPath Vaccine Company in 2012 and became its chief scientific officer in 2013.

In 2014 he co-founded Affinivax and served on the board of directors.

Siber was appointed to the board of trustees of the International Vaccine Institute in Korea in 2014 and chaired the board's science committee.

Siber served as the assistant director and head of bacterial vaccines for the Massachusetts Public Health Biological Laboratories in Jamaica Plain, Massachusetts, between 1982 and 1983. In 1983, he was promoted to the position of director, where he served until 1996.

Siber has held positions at Harvard Medical School (associate professor until 1996), Tufts University School of Medicine, University of Massachusetts Medical School (professor of medicine until 2012), and the Johns Hopkins Bloomberg School of Public Health (adjunct professor from 2008 to present).

Siber holds patents on RespiGam, the first Human respiratory syncytial virus immune globulin, and Prevnar, the first Pneumococcal Pneumonia Conjugate.

Respigam was the first antibody licensed for preventing severe RSV infections in high-risk infants and was the precursor product to Synagis, the first human monoclonal antibody for infectious diseases. Prevnar 7 and 13 are for the prevention of pneumococcal infections, the most common and severe bacterial infection of children and elderly adults worldwide causing mortality exceeding 1 million per year. Prevnar is also the most successful commercial vaccine of all time with sales exceeding four billion dollars per year.

Siber developed Meningitec (sp), the first Meningoccus C conjugate vaccine, Rotashield, the first Rotavirus diarrhea vaccine, and FluMist, the first Live attenuated influenza vaccine.

== Awards ==
- 1962-1966 – Domtar Scholar, Bishop's University, Lennoxville, Quebec, Canada
- 1966-1970 – University Scholar, McGill University, Montreal, Quebec, Canada
- 1968–present – Alpha Omega Alpha
- 1970 – Holmes Gold Medal, McGill University, Montreal, Quebec, Canada
- 1970 – J. Francis Williams Scholarship in Clinical Medicine, McGill University, Montreal, Quebec, Canada
- 1971 – Rush Medical College Award, Rush-Presbyterian-St. Luke's Hospital, Chicago, Illinois (Best Medical Intern)
- 1972 – Department of Medicine Award, Rush-Presbyterian-St. Luke's Hospital, Chicago, Illinois (Best Medical Resident)
- 1975 – Canadian MRC Fellowship in Infectious Diseases
- 2008 – Dedication of Massachusetts Biologic Laboratories Research and Development Building, Mattapan, MA to George R. Siber and Jeanne Leszczynsky
- 2016 – Albert B. Sabin Gold Medal
- 2024-DCL, Bishop’s University

== Bibliography ==
=== Journals ===
- Simoes, EA; Groothuis, JR; Tristram, DA; Allessi, K; Lehr, MV; Siber, GR; Welliver, RC (Aug 1996). "Respiratory syncytial virus-enriched globulin for the prevention of acute otitis media in high risk children". The Journal of Pediatrics. 129 (2): 214–9. doi:10.1016/s0022-3476(96)70245-7. PMID 8765618.
- Shahid, NS; Steinhoff, MC; Hoque, SS; Begum, T; Thompson, C; Siber, GR (November 11, 1995). "Serum, breast milk, and infant antibody after maternal immunisation with pneumococcal vaccine". Lancet. 346 (8985): 1252–7. doi:10.1016/s0140-6736(95)91861-2. PMID 7475716. S2CID 25681573.
- Englund, JA; Glezen, WP; Thompson, C; Anwaruddin, R; Turner, CS; Siber, GR (Dec 1997). "Haemophilus influenzae type b-specific antibody in infants after maternal immunization". The Pediatric Infectious Disease Journal. 16 (12): 1122–30. doi:10.1097/00006454-199712000-00005. PMID 9427456.
- Black, S; Shinefield, H; Fireman, B; Lewis, E; Ray, P; Hansen, JR; Elvin, L; Ensor, KM; Hackell, J; Siber, G; Malinoski, F; Madore, D; Chang, I; Kohberger, R; Watson, W; Austrian, R; Edwards, K (Mar 2000). "Efficacy, safety and immunogenicity of heptavalent pneumococcal conjugate vaccine in children. Northern California Kaiser Permanente Vaccine Study Center Group". The Pediatric Infectious Disease Journal. 19 (3): 187–95. doi:10.1097/00006454-200003000-00003. PMID 10749457. S2CID 72133749.
- Hausdorff, WP; Bryant, J; Paradiso, PR; Siber, GR (Jan 2000). "Which pneumococcal serogroups cause the most invasive disease: implications for conjugate vaccine formulation and use, part I." Clinical Infectious Diseases. 30 (1): 100–21. doi:10.1086/313608. PMID 10619740.
- Eskola, J; Kilpi, T; Palmu, A; Jokinen, J; Haapakoski, J; Herva, E; Takala, A; Käyhty, H; Karma, P; Kohberger, R; Siber, G; Mäkelä, PH; Finnish Otitis Media Study Group (February 8, 2001). "Efficacy of a pneumococcal conjugate vaccine against acute otitis media". The New England Journal of Medicine. 344 (6): 403–9. doi:10.1056/nejm200102083440602. PMID 11172176. S2CID 29430870.
- Santosham, M; Englund, JA; McInnes, P; Croll, J; Thompson, CM; Croll, L; Glezen, WP; Siber, GR (Oct 2001). "Safety and antibody persistence following Haemophilus influenzae type b conjugate or pneumococcal polysaccharide vaccines given before pregnancy in women of childbearing age and their infants". The Pediatric Infectious Disease Journal. 20 (10): 931–40. doi:10.1097/00006454-200110000-00005. PMID 11642626. S2CID 38227210.
- O'Brien, KL; Moulton, LH; Reid, R; Weatherholtz, R; Oski, J; Brown, L; Kumar, G; Parkinson, A; Hu, D; Hackell, J; Chang, I; Kohberger, R; Siber, G; Santosham, M (August 2, 2003). "Efficacy and safety of seven-valent conjugate pneumococcal vaccine in American Indian children: group randomised trial". Lancet. 362 (9381): 355–61. doi:10.1016/s0140-6736(03)14022-6. PMID 12907008. S2CID 23467115.
- Klugman, Keith P.; Madhi, Shabir A.; Huebner, Robin E.; Kohberger, Robert; Mbelle, Nontombi; Pierce, Nathaniel (2 October 2003). "A Trial of a 9-Valent Pneumococcal Conjugate Vaccine in Children with and Those without HIV Infection". New England Journal of Medicine. 349 (14): 1341–1348. doi:10.1056/NEJMoa035060. PMID 14523142.
- Dagan, R; Givon-Lavi, N; Fraser, D; Lipsitch, M; Siber, GR; Kohberger, R (August 1, 2005). "Serum serotype-specific pneumococcal anticapsular immunoglobulin g concentrations after immunization with a 9-valent conjugate pneumococcal vaccine correlate with nasopharyngeal acquisition of pneumococcus". The Journal of Infectious Diseases. 192 (3): 367–76. doi:10.1086/431679. PMID 15995949.
- Santosham, M; Reid, R; Chandran, A; Millar, EV; Watt, JP; Weatherholtz, R; Donaldson, C; Croll, J; Moulton, LH; Thompson, CM; Siber, GR; O'Brien, KL (Mar 22, 2007). "Contributions of Native Americans to the global control of infectious diseases". Vaccine. 25 (13): 2366–74. doi:10.1016/j.vaccine.2006.09.002. PMID 17069936.
- Siber, GR; Chang, I; Baker, S; Fernsten, P; O'Brien, KL; Santosham, M; Klugman, KP; Madhi, SA; Paradiso, P; Kohberger, R (May 10, 2007). "Estimating the protective concentration of anti-pneumococcal capsular polysaccharide antibodies". Vaccine. 25 (19): 3816–26. doi:10.1016/j.vaccine.2007.01.119. PMID 17368878.
- de Roux, A; Schmöle-Thoma, B; Siber, GR; Hackell, JG; Kuhnke, A; Ahlers, N; Baker, SA; Razmpour, A; Emini, EA; Fernsten, PD; Gruber, WC; Lockhart, S; Burkhardt, O; Welte, T; Lode, HM (Apr 1, 2008). "Comparison of pneumococcal conjugate polysaccharide and free polysaccharide vaccines in elderly adults: conjugate vaccine elicits improved antibacterial immune responses and immunological memory". Clinical Infectious Diseases. 46 (7): 1015–23. doi:10.1086/529142. PMID 18444818.
- Long, D, M. Skoberne, T. M. Gierahn, S. Larson, J. A. Price, V. C, A. E. Baccari, K P. Cohane, D. Garvie, G. R. Siber, and J. B. Flechtner,. Identification of novel virus-specific antigens by CD4+ and CD8+ T cells from asymptomatic HSV-2 seropositive and seronegative donors. Manuscript submitted, Virology 2014.

=== Books ===
- George R. Siber; Keith P. Klugman; P. Helena Mäkelä, eds. (2008). Pneumococcal vaccines: the impact of conjugate vaccine. Washington, DC: ASM Press. ISBN 9781555814083.
