= Jan Holmgren =

Swedish physician, microbiologist and immunologist

Jan Roland Holmgren (born in Borås, Sweden) is a Swedish physician, microbiologist, immunologist, and vaccinologist, known for his research on cholera and mucosal immunology, specifically, for his leadership in developing "the world's first effective oral cholera vaccine".

== Biography ==
At the University of Gothenburg, Holmgren graduated in 1965 with a bachelor of medicine degree, in 1969 with a Ph.D., and in 1973 with an M.D. His 1969 doctoral dissertation dealt with immunological aspects of urinary tract infections in children. At the University of Gothenburg, he was appointed in 1969 a docentry and in 1970 an associate professorship. From 1971 to 1980 he held research positions at the Swedish Medical Research Council. In 1980 he was appointed to the University of Gothenburg's professorial chair in medical microbiology and immunology as successor to Örjan Ouchterlony upon the latter's retirement. In addition to his professorship, Holmgren was appointed founding director of the Göteborg University Vaccine Research Institute (GUVAX), which was created in 2002. He is the author or co-author of more than 600 scientific papers.

Holmgren’s research has focused primarily on mucosal vaccine development as well as disease and immune mechanisms of cholera and other mucosal infections. Holmgren and colleagues first described the AB subunit structure and function of cholera toxin and identified the cholera toxin receptor, the GM1 ganglioside, then the first-ever structurally defined biologic receptor molecule. They were also the first to describe mucosal immune protection and memory in cholera.

In the 1980s and ‘90s, Dr. Holmgren and colleagues at the University of Gothenburg developed the Dukoral™ oral cholera vaccine, which became the first internationally licensed and World Health Organization (WHO) prequalified oral cholera vaccine. The vaccine, which was tested in large field trials in Bangladesh, Peru, Mozambique and Zanzibar, reduced cholera by 85 to 90 percent in the first six months after vaccination. Unlike previous injected cholera vaccines, which conferred weak protection for only a few months, Dukoral™ oral cholera vaccine continued to provide immune protection for three years after immunization.

His research contributed to the development of a vaccine together with Ann-Mari Svennerholm against Enterotoxigenic Escherichia coli (ETEC). Furthermore, his research has applications to understanding immunological mechanisms, such as immunological tolerance by oral immunization, and also to developing vaccines against some autoimmune diseases and allergies.

He received in 1977 the Swedish Academy of Sciences Prize for Medicine (Hilda and Alfred Erikssons Prize) and in 1994 both the Louis-Jeantet Prize for Medicine and the Söderbergska Prize of the Swedish Medical Society. He received in 2017 the Albert B. Sabin Gold Medal and in 2018 the Prince Mahidol Award in Public Health. He is a member of the Royal Swedish Academy of Science and the Swedish Academy of Engineering. He was a board member of the Knut and Alice Wallenberg Foundation from 1995 to 2017 and has served on the boards of other national and international organizations for research on vaccines, infections, and global health; the other organizations include the Global Alliance for Vaccines and Immunization (GAVI) and the International Vaccine Institute (IVI). In 2026 he was awarded the Canada Gairdner Global Health Award.

He married Ann-Mari Svennerholm, who was his first Ph.D. student. They have worked together since 1970. They have a son and two daughters.

== Selected publications ==
- Holmgren, J.; Lönnroth, I.; Månsson, J.; Svennerholm, L. (1975). "Interaction of cholera toxin and membrane GM! ganglioside of small intestine". Proceedings of the National Academy of Sciences. 72 (7): 2520–2524. Bibcode:1975PNAS...72.2520H. doi:10.1073/pnas.72.7.2520. PMC 432800. PMID 1058471.
- Holmgren, J. (1981). "Actions of cholera toxin and the prevention and treatment of cholera". Nature. 292 (5822): 413–417. Bibcode:1981Natur.292..413H. doi:10.1038/292413a0. PMID 7019725. S2CID 4333529.
- Hirst, T. R.; Sánchez, J.; Kaper, J. B.; Hardy, S. J.; Holmgren, J. (1984). "Mechanism of toxin secretion by Vibrio cholerae investigated in strains harboring plasmids that encode heat-labile enterotoxins of Escherichia coli". Proceedings of the National Academy of Sciences. 81 (24): 7752–7756. Bibcode:1984PNAS...81.7752H. doi:10.1073/pnas.81.24.7752. PMC 392230. PMID 6393126.
- Sánchez, J.; Holmgren, J. (1989). "Recombinant system for overexpression of cholera toxin B subunit in Vibrio cholerae as a basis for vaccine development". Proceedings of the National Academy of Sciences. 86 (2): 481–485. Bibcode:1989PNAS...86..481S. doi:10.1073/pnas.86.2.481. PMC 286494. PMID 2492108.
- Sun, J. B.; Holmgren, J.; Czerkinsky, C. (1994). "Cholera toxin B subunit: an efficient transmucosal carrier-delivery system for induction of peripheral immunological tolerance". Proceedings of the National Academy of Sciences. 91 (23): 10795–10799. Bibcode:1994PNAS...9110795S. doi:10.1073/pnas.91.23.10795. PMC 45112. PMID 7526379.
- Furuta, Y.; Eriksson, K.; Svennerholm, B.; Fredman, P.; Horal, P.; Jeansson, S.; Vahlne, A.; Holmgren, J.; Czerkinsky, C. (1994). "Infection of vaginal and colonic epithelial cells by the human immunodeficiency virus type 1 is neutralized by antibodies raised against conserved epitopes in the envelope glycoprotein gp120". Proceedings of the National Academy of Sciences. 91 (26): 12559–12563. Bibcode:1994PNAS...9112559F. doi:10.1073/pnas.91.26.12559. PMC 45478. PMID 7809077.
- Sun, J.B.; Rask, C.; Olsson, T.; Holmgren, J.; Czerkinsky, C. (1996). "Treatment of experimental autoimmune encephalomyelitis by feeding myelin basic protein conjugated to cholera toxin B subunit". Proceedings of the National Academy of Sciences. 93 (14): 7196–7201. Bibcode:1996PNAS...93.7196S. doi:10.1073/pnas.93.14.7196. PMC 38959. PMID 8692968.
- Bergerot, I.; Ploix, C.; Petersen, J.; Moulin, V.; Rask, C.; Fabien, N.; Lindblad, M.; Mayer, A.; Czerkinsky, C.; Holmgren, J.; Thivolet, C. (1997). "A cholera toxoid-insulin conjugate as an oral vaccine against spontaneous autoimmune diabetes". Proceedings of the National Academy of Sciences. 94 (9): 4610–4614. Bibcode:1997PNAS...94.4610B. doi:10.1073/pnas.94.9.4610. PMC 20771. PMID 9114038.
- Rask, C.; Holmgren, J.; Fredriksson, M.; Lindblad, M.; Nordström, I.; Sun, J. B.; Czerkinsky, C. (2000). "Prolonged oral treatment with low doses of allergen conjugated to cholera toxin B subunit suppresses immunoglobulin e antibody responses in sensitized mice". Clinical and Experimental Allergy. 30 (7): 1024–1032. doi:10.1046/j.1365-2222.2000.00849.x (inactive 30 August 2025). PMID 10848926.
- Holmgren, J.; Czerkinsky, C.; Eriksson, C.; Mharandi, A. (2003). "Mucosal immunisation and adjuvants: a brief overview of recent advances and challenges". Vaccine. 21, Supplement: S89–S95. doi:10.1016/s0264-410x(03)00206-8. PMID 12763689.
- Holmgren, J.; Czerkinsky, C. (2005). "Mucosal immunity and vaccines". Nature Medicine. 11 (4 Suppl): S45–S53. doi:10.1038/nm1213. PMID 15812489. S2CID 39274515.
- Sánchez, J.; Holmgren, J. (2005). "Virulence factors, pathogenesis and vaccine protection in cholera and ETEC diarrhea". Current Opinion in Immunology. 17 (4): 388–398. doi:10.1016/j.coi.2005.06.007. PMID 15963708.
- Sánchez, J.; Holmgren, J. (2008). "Cholera toxin structure, gene regulation and pathophysiological and immunological aspects". Cellular and Molecular Life Sciences. 65 (9): 1347–1360. doi:10.1007/s00018-008-7496-5. PMC 11131847. PMID 18278577. S2CID 472470.
- Holmgren J (2021). "Modern History of Cholera Vaccines and the Pivotal Role of icddr,b". J Infect Dis. 224 (12 Suppl 2): S742–S748. doi:10.1093/infdis/jiab423. PMC 8687080. PMID 34453544.
- Holmgren J (2021). "An Update on Cholera Immunity and Current and Future Cholera Vaccines". Trop Med Infect Dis. 6 (2): 64. doi:10.3390/tropicalmed6020064. PMC 8167659. PMID 33925118.
