= Örjan Ouchterlony =

Swedish bacteriologist and immunologist

Örjan Thomas Ouchterlony (January 14, 1914, Stockholm – September 25, 2004) was a Swedish bacteriologist and immunologist who is credited with the creation of the Ouchterlony double immuno diffusion test in the 1940s. He was trained at Karolinska Institute, where his received his medical doctorate. He worked at Sweden's State Bacteriology Laboratory from 1935 to 1952. Ouchterlony was a professor of bacteriology at the Medical Faculty of University of Gothenburg from 1952 to 1980 and was elected a member of the Royal Swedish Academy of Sciences in 1968. In addition to his laboratory work, he did research in field epidemiology of infectious diseases and worked and lectured in Africa and the United States, as well as in several countries in Europe. Upon his retirement in 1980, the successor to his professorial chair was Jan Holmgren.

The Ouchterlony plate is one of the more frequently used techniques for the identification of antigens and antibodies, by measurement of diffusion gradients in gel. Among its many applications has been the search for tumor-specific antigens. The technique was introduced by Örjan Ouchterlony of Sweden, in 1948, initially for the in vitro testing of the toxin-producing capacity of diphtheria bacteria (Acta Pathol. Microbio!. Stand., 25: 186-191, 1948). The technique was proved well suited to the analysis of complex serological systems, including analysis that helped to elucidate the structural heterogeneity of immunoglobulins. Ouchterlony reviewed the history of the developments, which extends back to the late Nineteenth Century (Prog. Allergy, 5: 1-78, 1958).

== Important works ==
1. Ouchterlony Ö (1949), Antigen-antibody reactions in gels and the practical application of this phenomenon in the laboratory diagnosis of diphtheria. Thesis., Solna: Karolinska Institute
2. Ouchterlony Ö (1948), "In vitro method for testing the toxin-producing capacity of diphtheria bacteria", Acta Pathol Microbiol Scand, 25 (1–2): 186–191, doi:10.1111/j.1699-0463.1948.tb00655.x, PMID 18887479
3. Ouchterlony Ö (1949), "Antigen-antibody reactions in gels", Acta Pathol Microbiol Scand, 26 (4): 507–515, doi:10.1111/j.1699-0463.1949.tb00751.x, PMID 18143039
4. Ouchterlony Ö (1953), "Antigen-antibody reactions in gels. IV. Types of reactions in coordinated systems of diffusion", Acta Pathol Microbiol Scand, 32 (2): 231–240, doi:10.1111/j.1699-0463.1953.tb00247.x
5. Ouchterlony Ö (1958). "Diffusion-in-gel methods for immunological analysis". Progress in Allergy Vol. 5. Chemical Immunology and Allergy. Vol. 5. pp. 1–78. doi:10.1159/000391318. ISBN 978-3-8055-1103-2.
