= Carol J. Baker =

American vaccinologist (born 1948)

Carol J. Baker (born 1948) is an American pediatric infectious disease specialist and vaccinologist, known for her pioneering work in Group B Streptococcus (GBS) prevention. Baker is a Professor of Pediatrics, Molecular Virology, and Microbiology at Baylor College of Medicine in Houston. She has held numerous leadership positions, including past president of the National Foundation for Infectious Diseases (NFID) and former chair of the Advisory Committee on Immunization Practices (ACIP). She is referred to as the "Godmother of Group B Strep prevention" due to her groundbreaking research and advocacy efforts

Her research has impacted public health by leading to the adoption of routine screening and antibiotic prophylaxis for pregnant women to prevent early-onset GBS disease in newborns. This intervention has reduced GBS infection rates in newborns. Baker has been appointed as the Global Vaccine Engagement Adviser for Group B Strep Support. Baker is a member of the National Academy of Medicine and the recipient of the 2019 Albert B. Sabin Gold Medal.
