= Institute of Advanced Virology, Kerala =

Virology research organization in India

- Established: 2019
- Location: Bio360 Life Science Park, Thonnakal, Trivandrum
- Website: Official Website

The Institute of Advanced Virology (IAV) has been established by the Government of Kerala through Kerala Biotechnology Commission (KBC) of Kerala State Council for Science Technology and Environment (KSCSTE) on the wake of the 2018 Nipah virus outbreak in Kerala. The institute is located in the Bio 360 Life Sciences Park at Thiruvananthapuram, Kerala, India. The foundation stone of the IAV was laid on 30 May 2018 and inaugurated on 9 February 2019. The institute is also affiliated to the Global Virus Network (GVN).

Currently The institute comprises the following divisions:

- Clinical Virology
- Viral Diagnostics
- Viral Vaccines
- Antiviral Drug Research
- Viral Applications
- Viral Epidemiology, Vector Dynamics, and Public Health
- Virus Genomics, Bioinformatics, and Statistics
- General Virology
