= Ouchterlony double immunodiffusion =

Biomedical technique

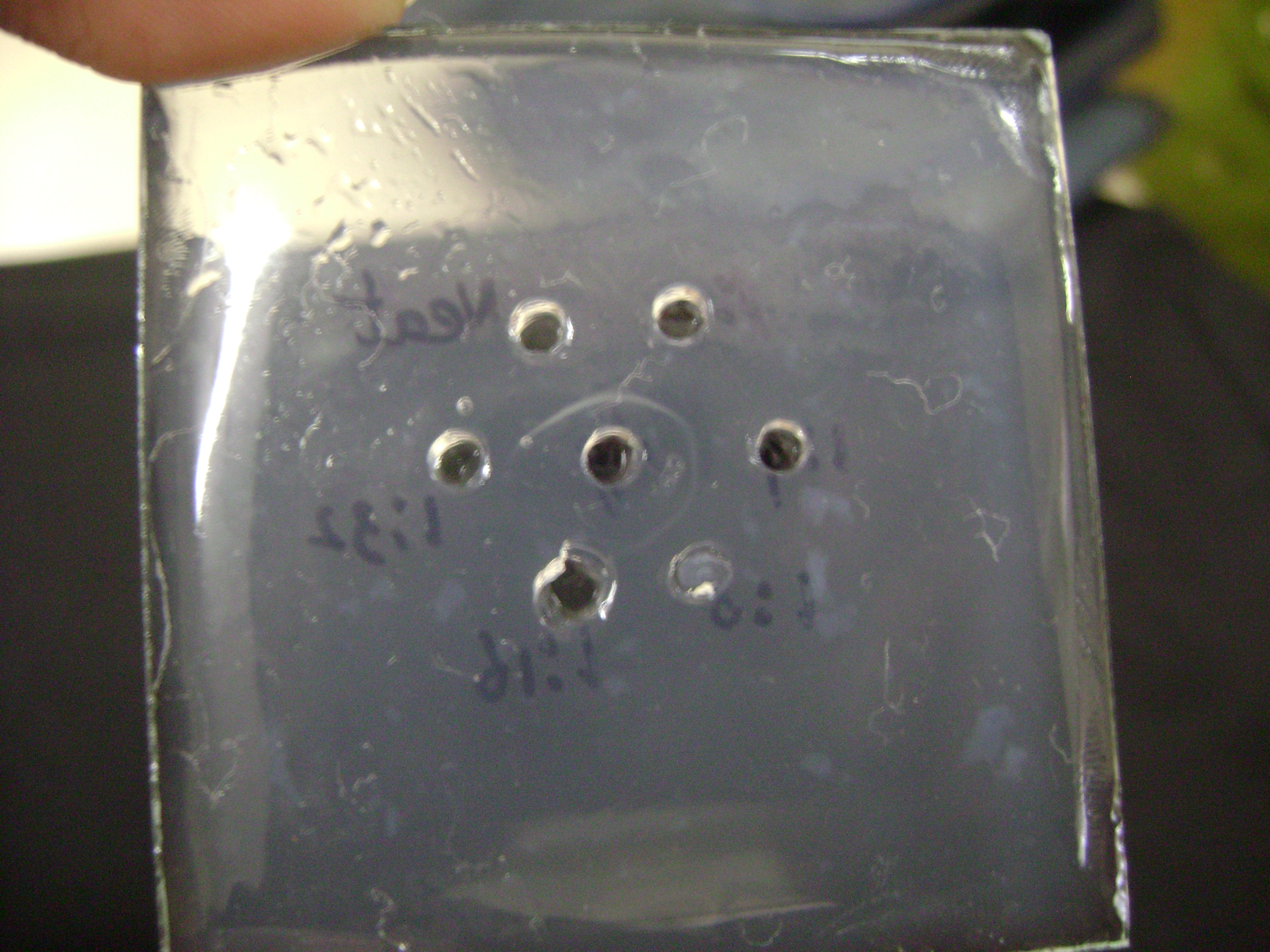
Picture of an Ouchterlony double immunodiffusion plate, after immunodiffusion has taken place. In this, titre value of an antigen is quantified. The central well has an antibody, and the surrounding wells have decreasing concentration of the corresponding antigen.

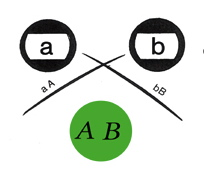
Ouchterlony patterns showing no identity between upper spots

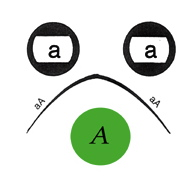
Ouchterlony patterns showing full identity between upper spots

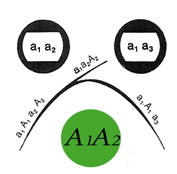
Ouchterlony patterns showing partial identity between upper spots

Ouchterlony double immunodiffusion (also known as passive double immunodiffusion) is an immunological technique used in the detection, identification and quantification of antibodies and antigens, such as immunoglobulins and extractable nuclear antigens. The technique is named after Örjan Ouchterlony, the Swedish physician who developed the test in 1948 to evaluate the production of diphtheria toxins from isolated bacteria.

== Procedure ==
A gel plate is cut to form a series of holes ("wells") in an agar or agarose gel. A sample extract of interest (for example human cells harvested from tonsil tissue) is placed in one well, sera or purified antibodies are placed in another well and the plate left for 48 hours to develop. During this time the antigens in the sample extract and the antibodies each diffuse out of their respective wells. Where the two diffusion fronts meet, if any of the antibodies recognize any of the antigens, they will bind to the antigens and form an immune complex. The immune complex precipitates in the gel to give a thin white line (precipitin line), which is a visual signature of antigen recognition.

The method can be conducted in parallel with multiple wells filled with different antigen mixtures and multiple wells with different antibodies or mixtures of antibodies, and antigen-antibody reactivity can be seen by observing between which wells the precipitate is observed. When more than one well is used there are many possible outcomes based on the reactivity of the antigen and antibody selected. The zone of equivalence lines may give a full identity (i.e. a continuous line), partial identity (i.e. a continuous line with a spur at one end), or a non-identity (i.e. the two lines cross completely).

The sensitivity of the assay can be increased by using a stain such as Coomassie brilliant blue, this is done by repeated staining and destaining of the assay until the precipitin lines are at maximum visibility.

== Theory ==
Precipitation occurs with most antigens because the antigen is multivalent (i.e. has several antigenic determinants per molecule to which antibodies can bind). Antibodies have at least two antigen binding sites (and in the case of immunoglobulin M there is a multimeric complex with up to 10 antigen binding sites), thus large aggregates or gel-like lattices of antigen and antibody are formed. Experimentally, an increasing amount of antigen is added to a constant amount of antibody in solution. Initially at low antigen concentration, all of the antibody is contained in the precipitate. This is called the antibody-excess zone (i.e. prozone phenomenon). As more antigen is added, the amount of protein precipitated increases until the antigen/antibody molecules are at an optimal ratio. This is known as the zone of equivalence or equivalence point. When the amount of antigen in solution exceeds the amount of antibody, the amount of precipitation will decrease. This is known as the antigen excess zone.
