= Rachel Schneerson =

Israeli-American vaccinologist (born 1932)

- רחל שניאורסון
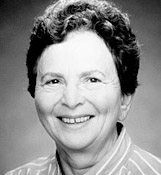
- Born: 25 April 1932 (age 94)
- Education: Haddasah Medical School
- Known for: Albert Lasker Award for Clinical Medical Research
- Scientific career
- Fields: Haemophilus influenzae type b vaccine
- Workplaces: Eunice Kennedy Shriver National Institute of Child Health and Human Development; National Institute of Child Health and Human Development; Albert Einstein College of Medicine

Rachel Schneerson (Hebrew: רחל שניאורסון; born April 25, 1932) is a former senior investigator in the Laboratory in Developmental and Molecular Immunity and head of the Section on Bacterial Disease Pathogens and Immunity within the Laboratory at the Eunice Kennedy Shriver National Institute of Child Health and Human Development within the National Institutes of Health. She is best known for her development of the vaccine against bacterial meningitis (Haemophilus influenzae type b (Hib)) with her colleague John B. Robbins.

Schneerson received the 1996 Albert Lasker Award for Clinical Medical Research and the Pasteur Award from the World Health Organization Children's Vaccine Initiative, both with her colleague Robbins. In 1998, she received a Citation Award from the Infectious Diseases Society of America.

Schneerson retired from federal service in 2012.

== Education and early career ==
Rachel Schneerson was born on April 25, 1932, in Warsaw, Poland. She earned her medical degree from Haddasah Medical School, the Hebrew University of Jerusalem.

Scheerson did a rotating internship at Tel-Hashomer Government Hospital, Tel Aviv, Israel, followed by pediatrics residency at Hillel-Jaffe Government Hospital, Hadera, Israel. She then returned to Tel-Hashomer Government Hospital, in Tel-Aviv, for a pediatrics residency and a year as a senior resident in Internal Medicine and Cytogenetics. In 1966, Schneerson was board certified in pediatrics in Israel and became a senior pediatrician at Tel-Hashomer.

In 1969, she came to the United States to be an instructor in the Department of Pediatrics and the Laboratory of Immunology at Albert Einstein College of Medicine in New York, where she met John B. Robbins. The two became an inseparable research team, “dedicated to developing vaccines to protect children from bacterial diseases.”

Schneerson and Robbins came to the National Institute of Child Health and Human Development (NICHD) in 1970 after being recruited by the Institute’s then Scientific Director Charles Lowe. In 1974, the two went to the Division of Bacterial Products, where Robbins was named chief, at the Bureau of Biologics within the U.S. Food and Drug Administration. Schneerson advanced from a visiting scientist to a senior staff fellow to a supervisory research medical officer during her time in the Division.

Schneerson and Robbins returned to the NICHD in 1983 to head the Laboratory of Developmental and Molecular Immunity within the Division of Intramural Research. In 1998, Schneerson and Robbins were named heads of the Section on Bacterial Disease Pathogenesis and Immunity. The two continued leading the lab until their retirement in July 2012.

== Notable research ==
Rachel Schneerson is best known for her work on the vaccine for Haemophilus influenza type b (types are always lowercase in bacteriology)or Hib. Prior to the vaccine’s use, Hib infected 20,000 U.S. children younger than age 5 each year; 5% died of those, and one-third were left with intellectual disability, deafness, or seizures. It was the leading cause of acquired intellectual disability in the United States.

Schneerson and Robbins believed that they could induce immunity by injecting a single antigen—the polysaccharide (sugar) from the surface of the bacteria—into children. Few others believed this process could work because the accepted belief at the time was that proteins, not sugars, were immunogens. Vaccine research at the time focused on using whole bacteria that had been killed, or of weakened bacteria, that could sometimes cause severe side effects.

Studies in animals, adult humans, and children documented that injecting the polysaccharide alone could induce protective levels of antibodies to Hib. Using polysaccharides also eliminated many of the severe side effects of killed-bacteria vaccines. Scientists supported by the National Institute of Allergy and Infectious Diseases did further vaccine testing. With the added involvement of industry, three Hib-purified polysaccharide vaccines were produced and licensed in 1985.

But among infants, whose immune systems were immature, the level of protection was too low and the vaccine didn’t prevent Hib. In fact, many scientists believed that a polysaccharide-based vaccine would never work because immature defenses of the infant immune system were not savvy enough to detect the polysaccharide and make antibodies.

Schneerson and Robbins tried a new process: They linked the weak polysaccharide to a protein carrier, one that was easily recognized by the immature immune system of infants, in an effort to boost its antigenicity. This novel process—called a “conjugate” vaccine—worked. The conjugate vaccine for Hib produced high antibody levels, well above what was needed for protection, among infants from injections starting at age 2 months and persisting for years beyond.

The vaccine was licensed by the U.S. Food and Drug Administration and became part of the standard immunization series for infants in 1987. In just a few years, Hib cases fell to fewer than 100 per year, a 99% drop. Most pediatricians trained since 1995 have never seen a Hib case. In countries where the vaccine is used, including the United States, Hib is no longer a cause of acquired intellectual disability.

After the success of the Hib vaccine, Schneerson and Robbins continued their work on single antigens and conjugate vaccines. Their efforts led to the development and licensing of vaccines against pertussis (whooping cough), typhoid, Staphylococcus infections (pneumonia, aureus, and Group B), certain types of malaria, and anthrax. Additional information about their more recent research is available at http://2012annualreport.nichd.nih.gov/pdmi.html.

Schneerson is named on dozens of patents and has authored and co-authored hundreds of peer-reviewed articles and several books.

Schneerson retired from the federal government in July 2012.

== Professional awards ==
- Albert Lasker Clinical Medical Research Award in 1996 for “groundbreaking work and bold, visionary and imaginative leadership in the development and commercialization of the Hemophilus influenzae type b vaccine and bringing the vaccine to market, leading to the eradication of Hemophilus influenzae type B, typhoid, and pneumococcus.”
- World Health Organization Children's Vaccine Initiative Pasteur Award for “Recent Contributions in Vaccine Development for the landmark development of a polysaccharide-protein conjugate vaccine for Hemophilus influenzae type b (Hib).”
- Infectious Diseases Society of America (IDSA) Citation Award 1998
- Elected to the NICHD Hall of Honor (2003)
