= Barbara J. Stoll =

American pediatrician and professor

- Education: Barnard College, Yale School of Medicine
- Medical career
- Profession: Professor
- Field: Pediatrics
- Institutions: McGovern Medical School
- Awards: John Howland Award

Barbara J. Stoll is an American pediatrician and professor. She is the H. Wayne Hightower Distinguished Professor in the Medical Sciences, Professor of Pediatrics and former Dean at McGovern Medical School at the University of Texas in Houston Texas, USA.

== Early life and education ==
Stoll grew up in New York City and graduated from Bronx High School of Science. She completed her Bachelor of Arts from Barnard College. Stoll earned a M.D. from Yale School of Medicine, graduating cum laude. She completed a pediatric internship and residency at Babies Hospital and a fellowship in neonatology at Emory University School of Medicine.

== Career ==
After her fellowship, Stoll was an associate scientist at the International Centre for Diarrhoeal Disease Research, Bangladesh. She was a visiting scientist at University of Gothenburg where she researched systemic and mucosal immune response to diarrheal agents. In 1984, Stoll became an assistant professor in the Uniformed Services University of the Health Sciences Department of Medicine. She researched immune mechanisms of infectious disease prevention. In 1986, she began at the division of neonatal-perinatal medicine at Emory University School of Medicine. She took a year sabbatical working for the World Health Organization where she raised awareness on neonatal morbidity and mortality in developing countries. In 1997, she was promoted to full professor of pediatrics at Emory. In 1999, she was named the vice-chair for research in the department of pediatrics. In 2004, she became the chair of the department. She was the second woman to chair a department at Emory, following Luella Klein, and the first woman to chair Emory's Department of Pediatrics. Stoll was the first Chair of Pediatrics from Emory to participate in a senior leadership role at Children's Healthcare of Atlanta. As of 2015, she is the H. Wayne Hightower Distinguished Professor in the Medical Sciences, Professor of Pediatrics and former Dean at the University of Texas Health Science Center at Houston.

== Personal life ==
Stoll met Roger I. Glass when she was 19 years old. They married while she was in medical school. They have three children, Nina, Michael, and Andy Glass.

== Awards and honors ==
Stoll is a fellow of the American Academy of Pediatrics. In 1986, she was elected member of the Society for Pediatric Research. In 1998 she was elected to the Infectious Diseases Society of America and the American Pediatric Society. In 2009, she was elected to the Institute Of Medicine. She served as president of the American Pediatric Society. In 2016, she received the John Howland Award.
