= John E. Fogarty International Center =

Part of the United States National Institutes of Health

Coordinates: 39.0043°N 77.1001°W

John Edward Fogarty International Center
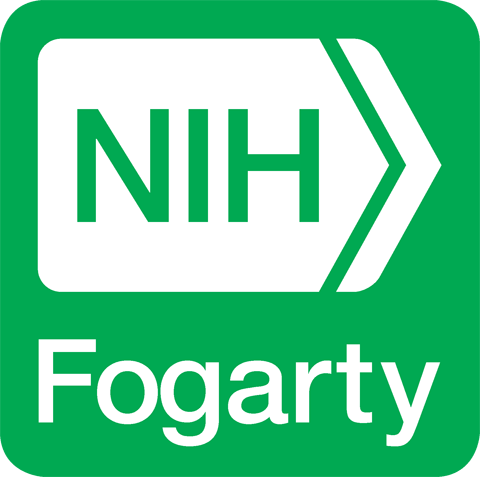

Agency overview
- Formed: July 1, 1968
- Headquarters: Bethesda, Maryland
- Parent agency: National Institutes of Health
- Website: www.fic.nih.gov

The John E. Fogarty International Center was founded in 1968 by US President Lyndon Johnson at the National Institutes of Health to support international medical and behavioral research and to train international researchers.

== History ==
On July 1, 1968, President Lyndon Johnson issued an Executive Order establishing the John E. Fogarty International Center for Advanced Study in the Health Sciences at the National Institutes of Health (NIH) in order to support international medical and behavioral research and to train international researchers. In March 2017, the Trump administration proposed cuts to the NIH budget, including elimination of the Fogarty Center, saving $69 million.

View source data.
Congressional appropriations to the FIC
Fiscal years 1980–2019

== Directors ==
Past directors from 1968 - present

No.	Portrait	Director	Took office	Left office	Refs.
1		Milo D. Leavitt, Jr.	June 16, 1968	June 30, 1978	
2		Leon Jacobs	July 1, 1978	June 29, 1979	
acting		Edwin D. Becker	July 1979	April 1980	
acting		Vida H. Beaven	April 1980	January 1981	
3		Claude Lenfant	February 1981	July 1982	
acting		Mark S. Beaubien	July 1, 1982	January 1984	
4		Craig K. Wallace	January 19, 1984	December 1987	
acting		Carl Kupfer	January 1, 1988	July 1988	
5		Philip E. Schambra	August 1989	September 30, 1998	
6		Gerald T. Keusch	October 1, 1998	December 31, 2003	
acting		Sharon H. Hrynkow	January 1, 2004	May 2006	
7		Roger I. Glass	June 11, 2006	January 14, 2023	
acting		Peter Kilmarx	January 15, 2023	May 4, 2024	
8		Kathleen Neuzil	May 5, 2024	Present	
