= William Hall (poet) =

English poet and antiquarian (1748–1825)

William Hall (1748–1825) was an English poet and antiquary.

== Life ==
William Hall was born on 1 June 1748 at Willow Booth, a small island in the fen district of Lincolnshire. His parents were very poor, and he himself at a very early age married a girl named Suke or Sukey Holmes, and became a gozzard, or keeper and breeder of geese. But the floods swept away his flock, which (he complains) were appropriated by his neighbours, and after much wandering he settled in Marshland in Norfolk, where he gained for some time a living as an auctioneer and "cow-leech", while his wife practised midwifery and phlebotomy. Here he asserts (in verse) that his arm broke on account of rheumatic throbbing, whereupon he removed to Lynn, and commenced business as a dealer in old books. "The Antiquarian Library", as he called his shop, did fairly well, though he was obliged to sell, as opportunity offered, many other things besides books. He died in 1825.

== Works ==
Hall published a considerable number of strange rough rhymes, dealing with the fens, fen life, and the difficulties of his calling. "Low-Fen-Bill", as he sometimes styled himself, had a perception of his own faults, which he describes when mentioning John Taylor the "Water Poet",

Who near two centuries ago
Wrote much such nonsense as I do.

But, according to the Dictionary of National Biography, his doggerel is not without a certain Hudibrastic force, and it frequently contains graphic touches descriptive of modes of fen life now passed away. He published at Lynn:

1. A Sketch of Local History, being a Chain of Incidents relating to the state of the Fens from the Earliest Accounts to the Present Time, 1812.
2. Reflections upon Times, and Times, and Times! or a more than Sixty Years' Tour of the Mind, 1816; a second part was published in 1818.

== Sources ==
- Watt, Francis; Mills, Rebecca (2004). "Hall, William (1748–1825), poet and antiquary". Oxford Dictionary of National Biography. Oxford University Press. Retrieved 10 September 2022.
- Sketches of Obscure Poets: With Specimens of Their Writings. London: Cochrane & McCrone, 1833. pp. 156–177.

Attribution

- This article incorporates text from a publication now in the public domain: Watt, Francis (1890). "Hall, William (1748-1825)". In Stephen, Leslie; Lee, Sidney (eds.). Dictionary of National Biography. Vol. 24. London: Smith, Elder & Co. pp. 93–94.
