= William Whitty Hall =

American physician

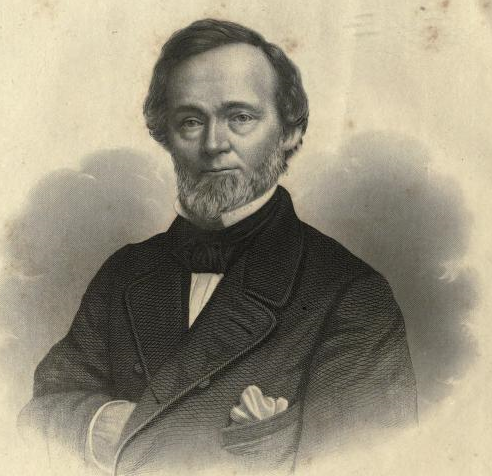
- Born: October 15, 1810; Paris, Kentucky
- Died: May 10, 1876 (aged 65); New York City
- Occupations: Physician, health writer

Signature
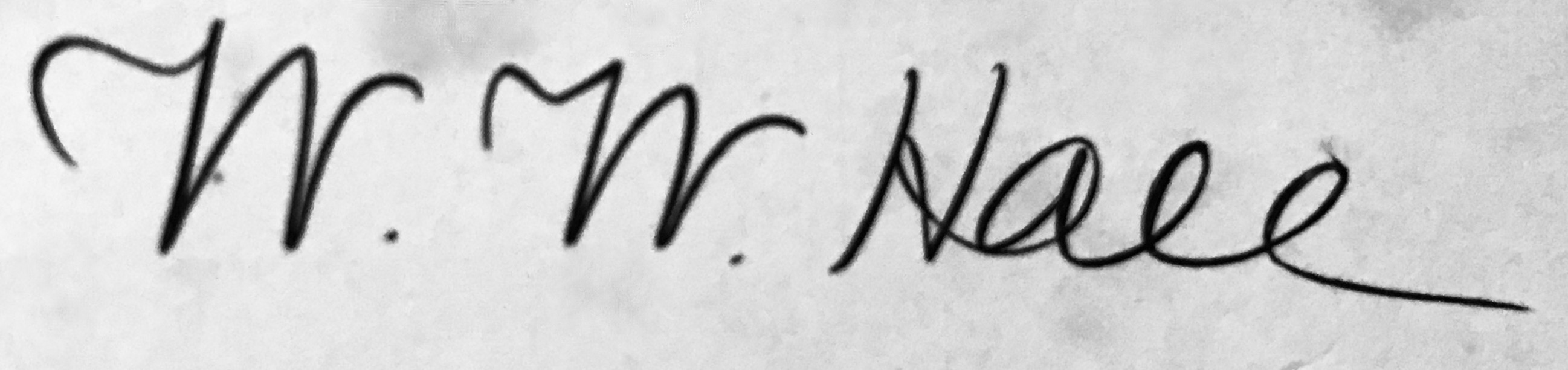

William Whitty Hall (October 15, 1810 - May 10, 1876) was an American medical doctor, writer and pioneer editor of health magazines.

== Biography ==
Hall was born in Paris, Kentucky. He graduated from Centre College in 1830 and studied both medicine and theology. He received his M.D. from Transylvania College in 1836. He was ordained to the Presbyterian ministry and was a missionary in Texas. He practiced medicine in New Orleans and Cincinnati and established his consultation practice in New York City in 1851.

In 1854, he began to publish Hall's Journal of Health. After his death the journal was absorbed by Popular Science. From 1875, he edited Hall's Medical Adviser. Hall married twice. His first wife was Hannah Mattock and his second was Magdalen Matilda Robertson.

Anthropologist Matthew Wolf-Meyer has described Hall as a forgotten researcher in the field of sleep science.

== Death ==
It was reported that Hall never weighed more than 125 pounds and he worked from 5 am to 10 pm every day.

He fell in a fit on a street in New York and died on May 10, 1876. Later examination showed that he died of "degeneration of the heart". His New York death certificate lists "valvular disease" as the cause of death as well.

== Selected publications ==
- Health and Disease (1864)
- Hall's Health Tracts (1868)
- Sleep, Or, The Hygiene of the Night (1870)
- Fun Better Than Physic: Or, Everybody's Life-Preserver (1871)
- Health by Good Living (1871)
- Bronchitis, and Kindred Diseases (1872)
- The Guide-Board to Health, Peace, and Competence; Or, The Road to Happy Old Age (1872)
- Health at Home (1874)
- How to Live Long (1875)
