= William Hall (basketball) =

British basketball player (born 1991)

Glasgow Rocks
- Position: Small forward
- League: British Basketball League

Personal information
- Born: 1 June 1991 (age 35) Sheffield, England
- Listed height: 6 ft 7 in (2.01 m)

Career information
- Playing career: 2013–2017

Career history
- 2014–2015: Leeds Force
- 2015–2016: Glasgow Rocks
- 2016–2017: Obila CB
- 2017–present: Glasgow Rocks

William J. Hall (born 1 June 1991) is a retired British professional basketball player, who formerly played for Glasgow Rocks of the British Basketball League.

== Junior career ==
As a youth player, he played for England's national under-18 basketball team at the 2009 FIBA Europe Under-18 Championship Division B, Where he average 6.0 Points and 2.0 Assists in 2 games

== Professional career ==
=== Europe ===
Hall began his career with Leeds Force, He finished the 2014-15 season averaging 14.2 points, 7.3 Rebounds and 2.5 Assists.

On 30 July 2015, Hall signed with Glasgow Rocks for the 2015-16 season. He appeared in thirty-six games averaging 12.6 Points, 6.9 Rebounds and 2.8 Assists.

On 26 September 2016, Hall signed a one-year deal with Obila CB of the Spanish LEB Plata. Hall had averaged 9.4 points, 5.5 rebounds and 1.4 assist after 2016-17 Spanish LEB Plata season.
