= Gerald T. Keusch =

American physician-scientist

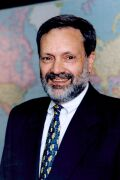

Director of the John E. Fogarty International Center
- In office October 1, 1998 – 2003
- Preceded by: Philip Schambra

Personal details
- Education: Columbia College (B.A.); Harvard Medical School (M.D.)
- Awards: Bristol-Myers Squibb Award (2002)
- Scientific career
- Fields: Infectious diseases
- Institutions: Mount Sinai School of Medicine; Tufts-New England Medical Center; Harvard Institute for International Development; Boston University School of Public Health

Gerald T. Keusch is an American physician-scientist and academic administrator. Keusch is the associate provost for global health at Boston University Medical Campus and a professor of international health and medicine at Boston University School of Public Health. He was the director of John E. Fogarty International Center and the associate director of international research at the National Institutes of Health from 1998 to 2003.

== Education ==
Keusch earned a B.A. from Columbia College. In 1963, he completed an M.D. from Harvard Medical School. Keusch performed both his internship and residency at the University at Buffalo School of Medicine and Biomedical Sciences.

== Career ==
In Bangkok, Thailand, Keusch worked as an NIH International Career Development Program Research Associate at the South East Asia Treaty Organization Research Laboratory. After a one-year stint as an instructor at Tufts-New England Medical Center, in 1971, Keusch joined the faculty of the Mount Sinai School of Medicine. His research focused on the effects and treatment of infectious diseases ranging from the molecular pathogenesis of tropical infectious to research on the clinical effects and treatment of those diseases. He had risen to full professor by 1978. He served concurrently on a National Academy of Sciences subcommittee on the interactions between nutrition and infection.

In 1978, Keusch was appointed professor of medicine at the Tufts-New England Medical Center. He also held the title of Chief Division of Geographic Medicine and Infectious Diseases. There he established a major research and training program in infectious diseases and international health. Keusch served concurrently as Scientific Director of the Health Group at the Harvard Institute for International Development where he oversaw long-term projects to increase research capacity in developing countries. His research included HIV studies where he directed one of the NIH-supported International Collaboration on AIDS Research projects. By the 1990s, he had consequently become an internationally recognized authority on infectious disease.

On October 1, 1998, Keusch became the associate director of NIH for international research and director of the Fogarty International Center. He succeeds Philip Schambra. Over the course of Keush's tenure the programs of the Center were expanded to focus on such critical global issues as infectious diseases and the growing incidence and severity of non-communicable diseases. Keusch stepped down as Director of the Fogarty Center in 2003 to join the faculty of Boston University as professor of international health and medicine in the School of Public Health. He holds the concurrent positions of associate provost for global health at the Boston University Medical Campus and Associate Dean for Global Health at the School of Public Health. Keusch is the associate director of the National Emerging Infectious Diseases Laboratories and the director of the collaborative core.

== Research ==
Keusch has experience in basic and clinical investigation into health problems such as HIV, malnutrition and diarrheal diseases. He is an expert in infectious diseases. His research has focused on molecular pathogenesis of enteric infections and vaccine development and on the effects of malnutrition on immune response and host defenses. He has conducted studies in Central America, Asia and Africa, where he directed one of the NIH-supported International Collaboration on AIDS Research projects on the epidemiology and natural history of chronic diarrhea and wasting syndrome ("slim disease").

== Awards and honors ==
From 1974 to 1979, Keusch had a NIH Research Career Development Award. In 1976, Keusch was elected to the American Society for Clinical Investigation. He won the Maxwell Finland Lectureship in 1997. In 2002, he became a member of the National Academy of Medicine. In 2002, Keusch won a Bristol-Myers Squibb Award for his long-term commitment to excellence in research, teaching and clinical practice and for fostering research training among young scientists in the United States and developing countries. He is a fellow of the Infectious Diseases Society of America a member of the Association of American Physicians.
