= Global Virus Network =

International group of medical virologists

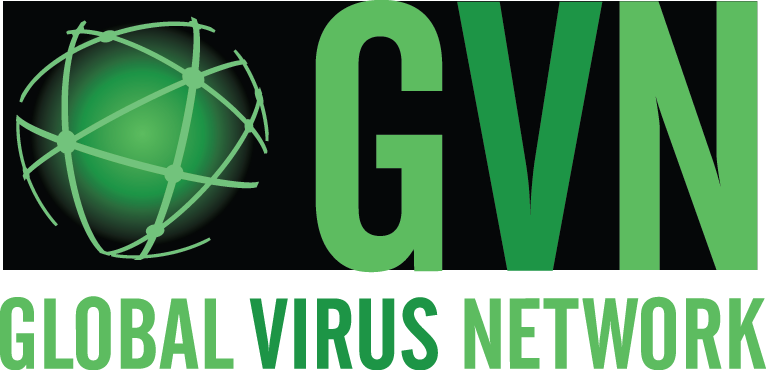
Logo of the Global Virus Network

The Global Virus Network (GVN) is an international coalition of medical virologists whose goal is to help the international medical community by improving the detection and management of viral diseases. The network was founded in 2011 by Robert Gallo in collaboration with William Hall and Reinhard Kurth, and 24 countries were members of the network as of 2015. The GVN fosters research into viruses that cause human disease to promote the development of diagnostics, antiviral drugs and vaccines, and its mission includes strengthening scientific training and response mechanisms to viral outbreaks. The GVN has organized task forces for chikungunya, human T-lymphotropic virus, and Zika. The network is headquartered at the Institute of Human Virology at the University of Maryland School of Medicine, and Gallo serves as its scientific director.

== Mission ==
The network's main mission is to tackle current broad viral threats as they develop, and to strengthen current research of viruses that cause human disease so as to prepare for any viral hazards. Their mission is outlined by 3 steps that they take to achieve it, which are international collective research, ongoing training of upcoming generations of medical virologists (public education), and advocacy. The GVN has grown to be a fundamental defense against diseases of viral nature.

=== International collective research ===
The GVN uses small grants to provide training fellowships so virologists can address current viral challenges. Global partnerships and mutual cooperation allows the GVN to span globally and to research viruses as they manifest and spread.

=== Public education ===
The GVN is also a source of credible information about viruses, vaccines, and breakthroughs in both fields, which they spread through digital and public speaking platforms. The GVN promotes educational programs for future generations of scientists and biologists, and is a resource for both large governments and small organizations attempting to prepare themselves for viral threats.

=== Advocacy ===
The final part of the GVN's mission is ensuring that funding persists, and that the network is able to provide up to date information through partnerships with governments and agencies across the world. The GVN also advocates for further virology research to be performed and for more virology training opportunities worldwide.

== Funding ==
All scientists and their research under the GVN are supported through various continuous small grants. The GVN works with governments as well as research companies to ensure that funding for both virology training and research are kept high enough to meet the demands of global health. The GVN also receives funding from its partners, the Global Health Security Agenda (GHSA), the Coalition for Epidemic Preparedness Innovations (CEPI), and the Medical Technology Enterprise Consortium (MTEC).

== History and centers ==
The GVN has 34 centers across 17 nations, each of which has a medical virologist as its director who is willing to commit to GVN's mission. Each center also specializes in at least two areas of viral science.

=== Centers ===
==== Locations in the Middle East ====
- Israel: Tel Aviv University

==== Locations in Southern and Eastern Africa ====
- South Africa
- Uganda.

==== Locations in Europe and Eurasia ====
- Ireland - University College Dublin
- Germany: Robert Koch Institute Berlin; Technical University of Munich; Philipp University Marburg
- Belgium: Northern Europe Consortium, Gembloux Agro-Bio Tech
- Italy: Italian Consortium – University of Verona
- Sweden: Scandinavian-Baltic Consortium, Karolinska Institute
- UK: MRC-University of Glasgow, Scotland; The Pirbright Institute, Surrey
- Spain: Centro de Biología Molecular Severo Ochoa (CBMSO), Madrid; Centre de Recerca en Sanitat Animal (CReSA), Barcelona
- Russia: Moscow Center for HIV/AIDS Prevention and Treatment
- Netherlands
- Scotland
- France

==== Locations in Asia ====
- China: Chinese Consortium – Chinese Centers for Disease Control
- India
  - Karnataka
    - Manipal Institute of Virology
  - Kerala
    - Amrita Institute of Medical Sciences and Research Cente, Kochi
    - Institute of Advanced Virology, Thiruvananthapuram

==== Locations in North and South America ====
- United States
  - Maryland: Institute of Human Virology at the University of Maryland School of Medicine; Johns Hopkins Bloomberg School of Public Health; J. Craig Venter Institute, Rockville
  - New York: Icahn School of Medicine at Mount Sinai; University of Rochester Medical Center; University of Buffalo
  - California: University of California San Francisco; Scripps Research Institute
  - Colorado: Colorado State University, Fort Collins
  - Michigan: University of Michigan
  - Pennsylvania: University of Pittsburgh Cancer Institute
  - Texas: UTMB Institute for Human Infections and Immunity, Galveston National Laboratory
- Argentina: IBBM – National University of La Plata

== Accomplishments ==
=== GVN against the Chikungunya virus (CHIKV) ===
==== Chikungunya virus explained ====
CHIKV is a rapid-working onset febrile illness, of which the first visible symptom is a rash on the hands and arms. The virus causes a high fever and has the same intensity as that of an acute viral infection, similar to any virus present and visible in the bloodstream.

==== What the GVN has done ====
The GVN was initially formed in 2011 in response to the outbreak of the Chikungunya virus, when it had just spread to the Western Hemisphere. While the GVN also discussed tackling the ongoing Ebola crisis centered around West Africa, the Chikungunya virus was their main priority at the time. CHIKV was discovered a little before 1968, and outbreaks had taken place everywhere from Thailand to the French Island of Réunion, where the virus at the time had caused 254 deaths. In 2013, the virus began to spread to the Caribbean and across the Atlantic to South America. The GVN is working toward antiviral drugs and vaccines against the Chikungunya virus, however one problem that the GVN has faced from the beginning is the limited ability to diagnose patients with the virus. As a result, the GVN was unable to control outbreaks in regions where the virus was most prominent because. However, so far the GVN has advanced the knowledge about the CHIKV infections, and has helped create a list of preventative measures which can be taken to stop the virus.

In response to the ability of the virus to spread much more rapidly than initially thought, the GVN advanced efforts to learn more about and stop the virus. The network enlisted a task force to research CHIKV, for which researchers were selected based on their personal research, qualifications, and accomplishments. The task force is made up of 22 members, 3 co-chairs, and is overseen by Scott Weaver, John Fazakerley, and Marc Lecuit. The task force had 4 main tasks for the Chikungunya virus: to find funding for CHIKV research, distribute information to journalists and health officials, advocate for more research on virus-carrying mosquitos, and to review the science of the disease to identify vaccines and to start drug trials.

=== GVN against the Zika virus ===
==== Zika virus explained ====
Zika is a fast-acting virus that can be transferred through mosquito bites, and from a pregnant woman to her fetus. Currently, no vaccines or specific medication exist to treat the symptoms associated with the Zika virus, however there are general medications which limit the common symptoms of the virus. Common symptoms include fever, rash, headache joint pain, red eyes, and muscle pain. Symptoms typically don't last more than a week and people rarely die from this virus. However, the virus poses a threat if it gets transferred to a fetus as it can cause birth defects, miscarriages, and stillbirths.

==== GVN's Plan ====
The GVN also assembled a task force to tackle the Zika virus. Unlike the CHIKV task force, Membership to this task force is voluntary, and any GVN member who has research or new developments that can be used in response to the Zika virus epidemic could contribute it. Scott Weaver acts as chairman to the Zika task force, which reports to all GVN centers regarding news and information about the virus. The GVN's main goal is to be control outbreaks and contain them to one general area so the virus is easier to diagnose, control, and possibly treat.

=== GVN against the Human T-Leukemia Virus (HTLV-1) ===
==== HTLV-1 explained ====
HTLV-1 affects one's T-cells, though the virus usually causes no visible signs or symptoms. However, severe symptoms include motor changes in your limbs, an inflamed spinal cord, weakened legs, and cognitive impairment. Some people affected by the infection can develop adult T-cell Leukemia and can be predisposed to other severe medical conditions. This virus can spread through sexual contact, unsterile needles, and blood transfusions. It can also spread to a child from the mother's breast milk. There currently exist no treatments or cures for HTLV-1, and the condition lasts for a lifetime. However, it is not a major threat as roughly 95% of those infected are asymptomatic their whole life.

==== GVN's Plan ====
The GVN has stated the importance of its work, which brings together the global community to conduct research and communicate about these viral problems that do not receive appropriate recognition in some areas. The task force made up of experts working on the HTLV-1 virus spans 11 countries, and is led by Dr. Robert Gallow in Maryland, Dr. Luc Willems in Belgium, and Dr. Hideki Hasegawa in Japan. The task force works daily to conduct research to hopefully stop HTLV-1, and the mission of the task force also includes funding drugs which can work to stop the virus from progressing into a disease.
