= William Hall (virologist) =

William W. Hall is the chair of medical microbiology and professor emeritus at the Centre for Research in Infectious Diseases at University College Dublin.

He is one of the founders of the Global Virus Network, along with Robert Gallo and Reinhard Kurth, of the Robert Koch Institute.

== Career ==
Hall earned his B.Sc.(Biochemistry) and Ph.D. (Biochemistry/ Virology) from Queen's University Belfast and his M.D. from Cornell University Medical College in New York.

He began his career as an Assistant Professor of Medicine at Cornell University. Later he worked as the Senior Physician and Director of the Clinical Research Centre at the Rockefeller University in New York. He was the former president of International Retrovirology Association. He was Professor of Medical Microbiology at University College Dublin.

He was a member of the National Public Health Emergency Team for the Irish Government. He is the former Director of National Virus Reference Laboratory (NVRL).

== Research ==
He is known for his research in human retroviruses and the roles of viruses in the development of leukaemia and lymphoma.

His research was instrumental in the Molecular Characterization and identifying the genetic heterogeneity of Human T Lymphotropic Virus Type II. His work proceeded onto animal models of viral diseases and molecular pathogenesis.

== Personal life ==
He is a photography enthusiast.

== Awards ==
- The GVN Robert C. Gallo Award for Scientific Excellence and Leadership
