= Will Hall (writer) =

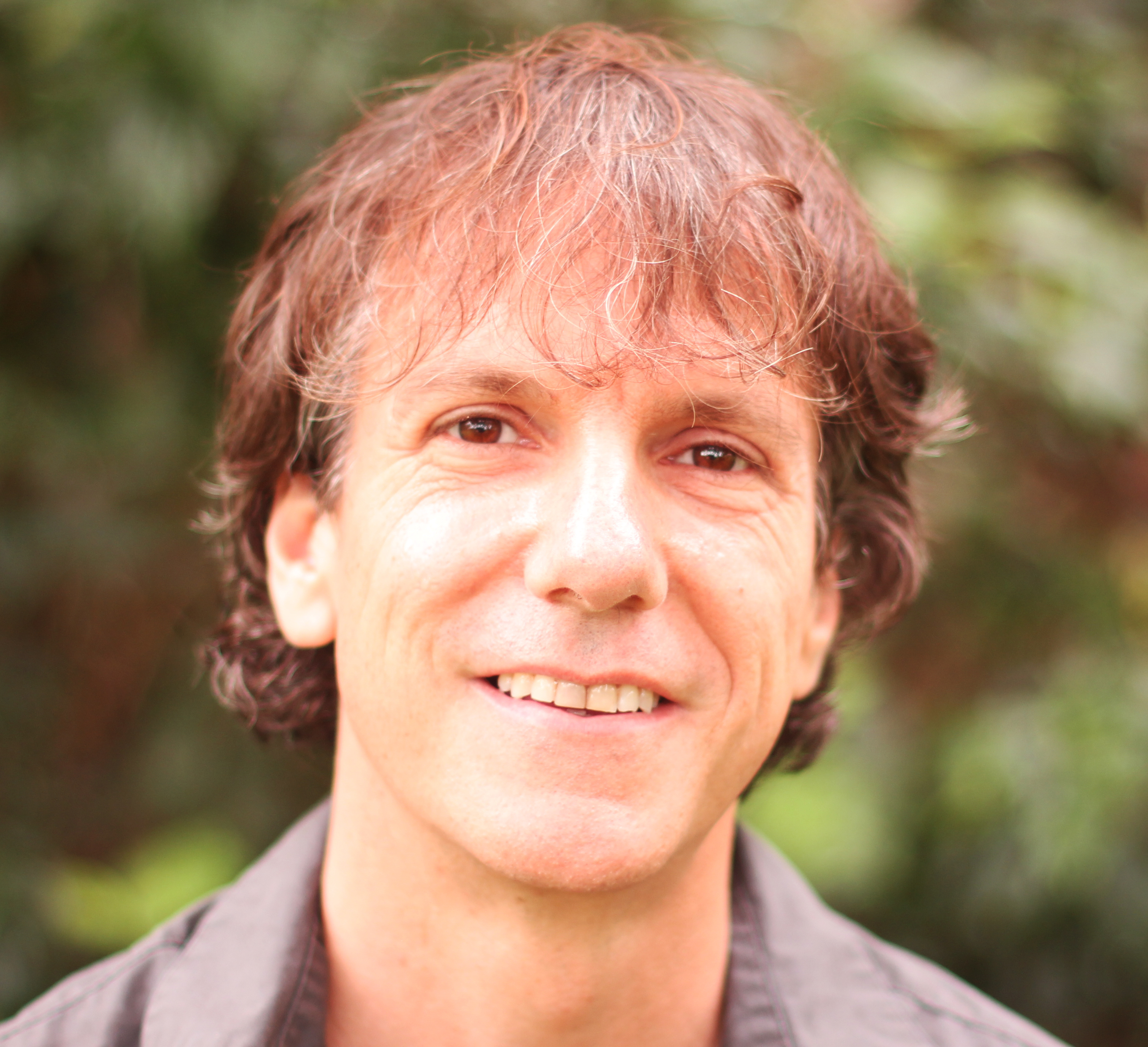
Will Hall, 2013

Will Hall (born 1966) is an American mental health advocate, counselor, writer, and teacher. Diagnosed with schizophrenia, he is involved in the recovery approach in mental health and is an organizer within the psychiatric survivors movement. Hall advocates the recovery approach to mental illness and is involved in the treatment and social response to psychosis.

In 2001, he co-founded the Freedom Center and from 2004 to 2009 was a co-coordinator for The Icarus Project. He has consulted for Mental Disability Rights International, the Family Outreach and Response Program, and the Office on Violence Against Women, and in 2012 presented to the American Psychiatric Association's Institute on Psychiatric Services.

Hall hosts the FM radio program, "Madness Radio," syndicated on the Pacifica Network, and in 2009, co-founded Portland Hearing Voices.

He lives in Oakland, California.

== Career ==
After graduating from the community studies program at the University of California, Santa Cruz in 1986, Hall worked for the Santa Cruz Sun newspaper as a staff reporter and for the Resource Center for Nonviolence's Brazil program. In 1988, he became co-director of the Earth Island Institute's Environmental Project on Central America, and traveled to El Salvador and Nicaragua during the civil wars in those countries.

In 1990, Hall's mental health began to deteriorate, and he was involuntarily committed to San Francisco General Hospital in 1992. He spent a year in the public mental health system, including restraints, solitary confinement in a padded cell, and more than two months in locked wards at Langley Porter Psychiatric Institute. He was diagnosed with schizoaffective disorder.

After leaving the traditional mental health system in 1993, Hall stopped taking psychiatric medications, and began to reestablish his well-being using holistic health, spiritual training, and social supports.

In 1996, he worked in the planning department of the advertising agency Wieden+Kennedy in Portland, Oregon.

In 1997, he became a student at the California Institute of Integral Studies in San Francisco. After another mental health crisis in 1999 precipitated in part by what he describes as the school's stigma towards psychiatric survivors and by the release of the film The Matrix, he left school and spent six months at the alternative residential facility, Burch House, in New Hampshire. In 2000, Hall moved to Northampton, Massachusetts, where he worked for five years at Broadside Bookshop.

In 2001, he began speaking publicly about his mental health experiences, and with Oryx Cohen co-founded and did peer counseling at the Freedom Center in Northampton, a support, advocacy, and human rights activism community run by people with psychiatric diagnoses.

In 2002, Hall joined activist Ed Russell to initiate a volunteer-run, low-power Pacifica Radio affiliate FM community radio station in Florence, Massachusetts called Valley Free Radio (VFR).

He is host of "Madness Radio", an interview format radio show which began on VFR and has been syndicated on the Pacifica Radio Network, including KBOO in Oregon, KRFP in Idaho, and WOOL Black Sheep Radio in Vermont.

From 2004 to 2009 he was on the co-coordinator collective of The Icarus Project, and he is author of Harm Reduction Guide to Coming Off Psychiatric Drugs, published by Freedom Center and The Icarus Project.

He is assistant director of Portland Hearing Voices in Portland, Oregon. Hall has worked as a consultant for Mental Disability Rights International in Mexico and Argentina; has taught at Sigmund Freud University in Vienna, Austria and Ljubljana, Slovenia; and has given talks and trainings in more than 35 countries.

Hall has a counseling, coaching and therapy practice. Hall has a Master of Arts in Process Work (MAPW) from the Process Work Institute in Portland, Oregon (2011) and a certificate in Open Dialogue through the Institute of Dialogic Practice in the village of Haydenville, Williamsburg, Massachusetts (2012). He is currently a PhD candidate at Maastricht University School of Mental Health and Neuroscience working in psychiatric epidemiology with Professor Jim van Os, and an advisor of the International Institute for Psychiatric Drug Withdrawal.

In 2023, Peter Lehmann translated and published a German translation of Halls's book Outside Mental Health – Voices and Visions of Madness with the title Jenseits der Psychiatrie – Stimmen und Visionen des Wahnsinns im Madness Radio.

== See also ==
- Hearing Voices Movement
- Biopsychiatry controversy
- Trauma model of mental disorders
- Social model of disability
- Judi Chamberlin
- Peter Lehmann
- WXOJ-LP
