= Sylvia Trent-Adams =

American public health official

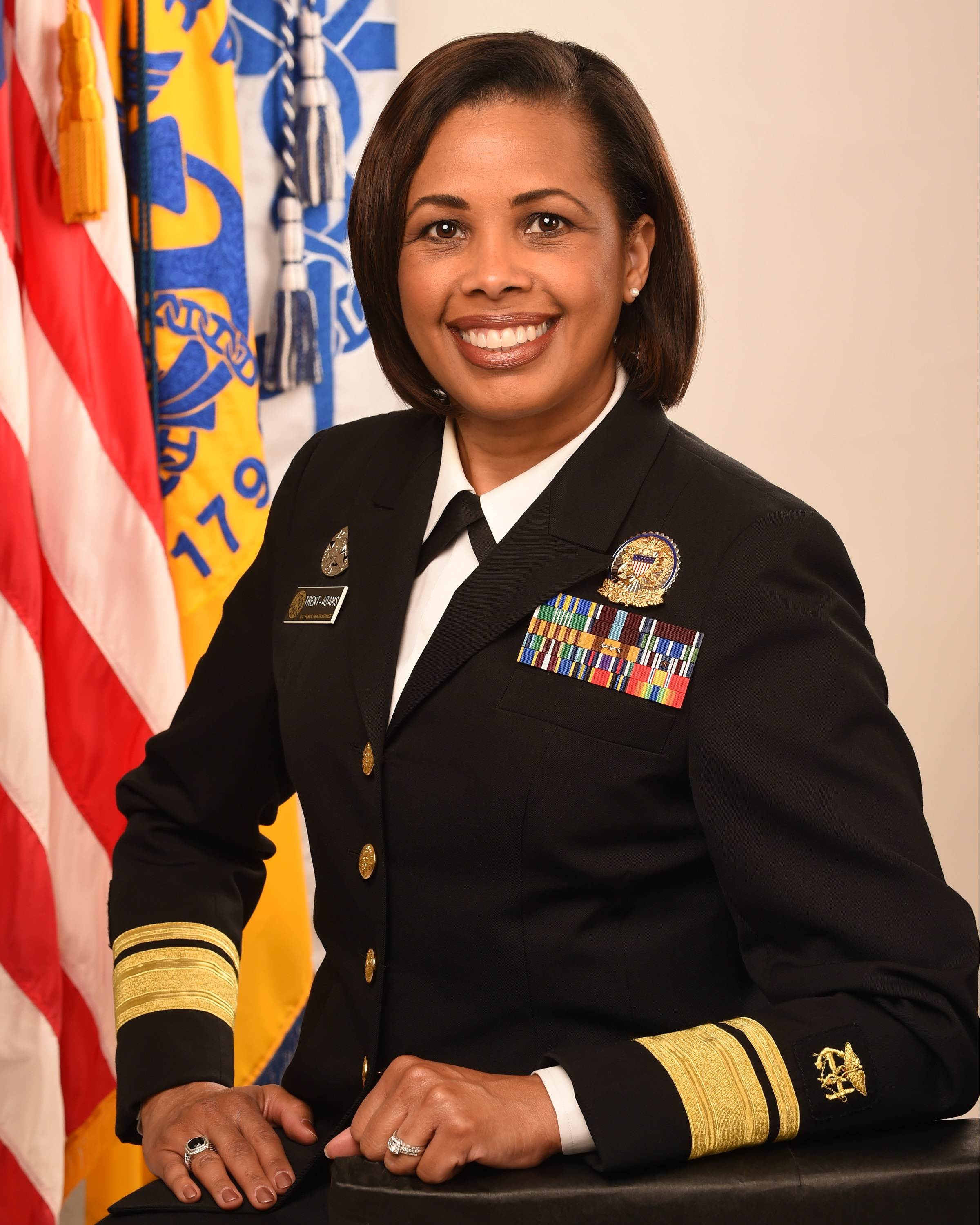

Principal Deputy Assistant Secretary for Health
- In office January 2, 2019 – September 30, 2020
- President: Donald Trump

Deputy Surgeon General of the United States
- In office October 25, 2015 – January 2, 2019
- President: Barack Obama; Donald Trump
- Preceded by: Vivek Murthy
- Succeeded by: Erica Schwartz

Surgeon General of the United States Acting
- In office April 21, 2017 – September 5, 2017
- President: Donald Trump
- Preceded by: Vivek Murthy
- Succeeded by: Jerome Adams

Personal details
- Born: June 15, 1965 (age 61) Lynchburg, Virginia, U.S.
- Education: Hampton University (BS); University of Maryland, Baltimore (MS); University of Maryland, Baltimore County (PhD)

Military service
- Allegiance: United States
- Branch/service: United States Army; USPHS Commissioned Corps
- Years of service: 1987–1992 (Army); 1992–2020 (Public Health Service)
- Rank: Rear admiral

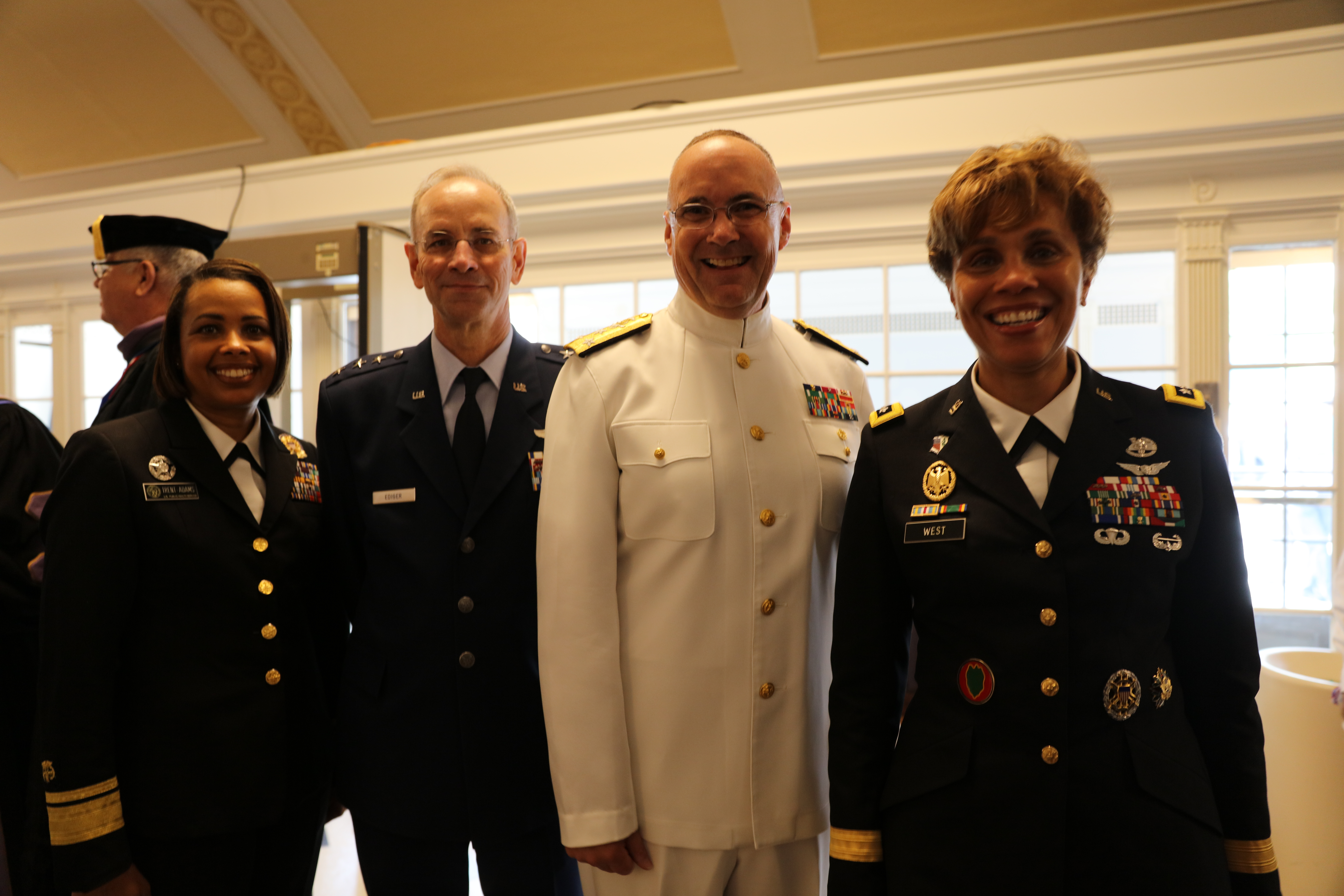
Sylvia Trent-Adams with the surgeons general of the Air Force, Navy and Army in May 2017

Sylvia Trent-Adams (born June 15, 1965) is a retired U.S. Public Health Service Commissioned Corps rear admiral, who last served as the principal deputy assistant secretary for health from January 2, 2019 to August 31, 2020. She previously served as the deputy surgeon general of the United States from October 25, 2015 to January 2, 2019. Trent-Adams also served as the acting surgeon general of the United States from April 21, 2017 to September 5, 2017. She retired from the U.S. Public Health Service on September 30, 2020 after over 33 years of combined uniformed service.

On October 5, 2020, Trent-Adams was named to the board of directors for AMN Healthcare. May 19, 2022, Trent-Adams was named to the board of the Institute for Healthcare Improvement (IHI). From 2020-2022, Trent-Adams served as the Executive Vice President, Chief Strategy Officer at the University of North Texas Health Science Center (UNTHSC), Fort Worth, TX. In 2022 she became the President of UNTHSC, and during her tenure the university was awarded a $150 million grant to research Alzheimer’s disease, the largest grant in the UNT system’s history. Dr. Trent-Adams also oversaw the launch of a new College of Nursing at UNTHSC. She stepped down as President on January 31, 2025. The decision comes months after an NBC News investigation exposed the center’s practice of dissecting and leasing out unclaimed corpses without the consent of families or next of kin. NBC News reported in September that over five years, the Fort Worth-based center had acquired approximately 2,350 unclaimed bodies from local counties. This operation generated about $2.5 million annually. On July 14, Trent-Adams became President and CEO of IHI.

== Education ==
Trent-Adams received a Bachelor of Science in nursing from Hampton University, a Master of Science in nursing and health policy from the University of Maryland, Baltimore, and a doctorate of Philosophy in Public Policy from the University of Maryland, Baltimore County. After attending college on an ROTC scholarship, she served as an officer in the U.S. Army Nurse Corps for five years, on the oncology unit of Walter Reed Army Medical Center.

== Career ==
Trent-Adams has held various positions in HHS, working to improve access to care for poor and under-served communities. As a clinician and administrator, she has had a direct impact on building systems of care to improve public health for marginalized populations.

Prior to joining the Office of the Surgeon General, Trent-Adams was the deputy associate administrator for the HIV/AIDS Bureau (HAB), Health Resources and Services Administration (HRSA). She assisted in managing the $2.3 billion Ryan White HIV/AIDS Treatment Extension Act of 2009 (Ryan White HIV/AIDS Program) for uninsured people living with HIV disease as well as training for health care professionals.

Trent-Adams began her career in the Commissioned Corps of the PHSCC in 1992. She has published numerous articles and presented to organizations and professional groups. Prior to joining the USPHS, Trent-Adams was a nurse officer in the U.S. Army. She also served as a research nurse at the University of Maryland. Trent-Adams completed two internships in the U.S. Senate where she focused on the prospective payment system for skilled nursing facilities and scope of practice for nurses and psychologists. She has served as guest lecturer at the University of Maryland and Hampton University. Her clinical practice was in trauma, oncology, community health, and infectious disease. She serves as chair of the Federal Public Health Nurse Leadership Council, and the Federal Nursing Service Council.

=== Acting Surgeon General of the United States ===
On April 21, 2017, Trent-Adams was named acting surgeon general, replacing Vice Admiral Vivek Murthy, a physician, who was relieved as surgeon general by the Trump administration. In assuming the post, Trent-Adams became the second non-physician to serve as surgeon general. Robert A. Whitney, a veterinarian, served as the 17th (acting) surgeon general. She is the second nurse to serve in this role. Richard Carmona, who served in the role under George W. Bush, was both a nurse and a physician. She was succeeded by Vice Admiral Jerome Adams on September 5, 2017.

== Awards and decorations ==
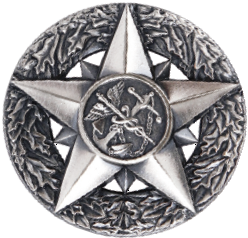

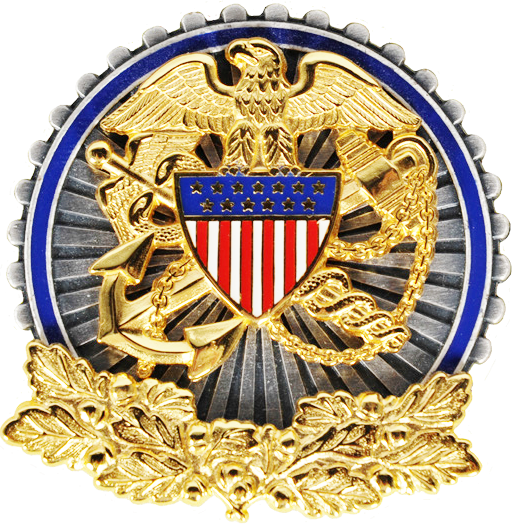

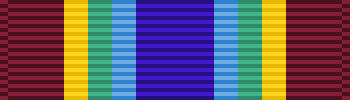

Badges	Officer-in-Charge Badge		Office of the Secretary of Health and Human Services Badge
1st row	Public Health Service Meritorious Service Medal	Surgeon General's Medallion	Surgeon General's Exemplary Service Medal with one gold award star
2nd row	Public Health Service Outstanding Service Medal	Public Health Service Commendation Medal	Army Commendation Medal
3rd row	Public Health Service Achievement Medal	Army Achievement Medal	USUHS Distinguished Service Medal
4th row	United States Public Health Service Presidential Unit Citation	Public Health Service Outstanding Unit Citation	Public Health Service Unit Commendation with three silver service stars
5th row	Florence Nightingale Medal	Public Health Service Global Health Campaign Medal	Public Health Service Ebola Campaign Medal with Expeditionary Attachment
6th row	Public Health Service Special Assignment Award with service star	Public Health Service Foreign Duty Award	Public Health Service Crisis Response Service Award
7th row	Public Health Service Global Response Service Award	Public Health Service Bicentennial Unit Commendation Award	National Defense Service Medal
8th row	Public Health Service Regular Corps Ribbon	Commissioned Corps Training Ribbon	Army Service Ribbon

In 2017, she was awarded the Red Cross' Florence Nightingale Medal, the highest international distinction in the nursing profession.

== Personal life ==
Trent-Adams grew up on a farm in Concord, Virginia and graduated from Appomattox County High School in 1983. She is married to Dennis Adams and has two daughters.

Military offices
Preceded by Vivek Murthy	Surgeon General of the United States; Acting; 2016–2017	Succeeded by Jerome Adams
Preceded by Vivek Murthy	Deputy Surgeon General of the United States; 2016–2019	Succeeded by Erica G. Schwartz
