= Brett Giroir =

American physician-scientist (born 1960)

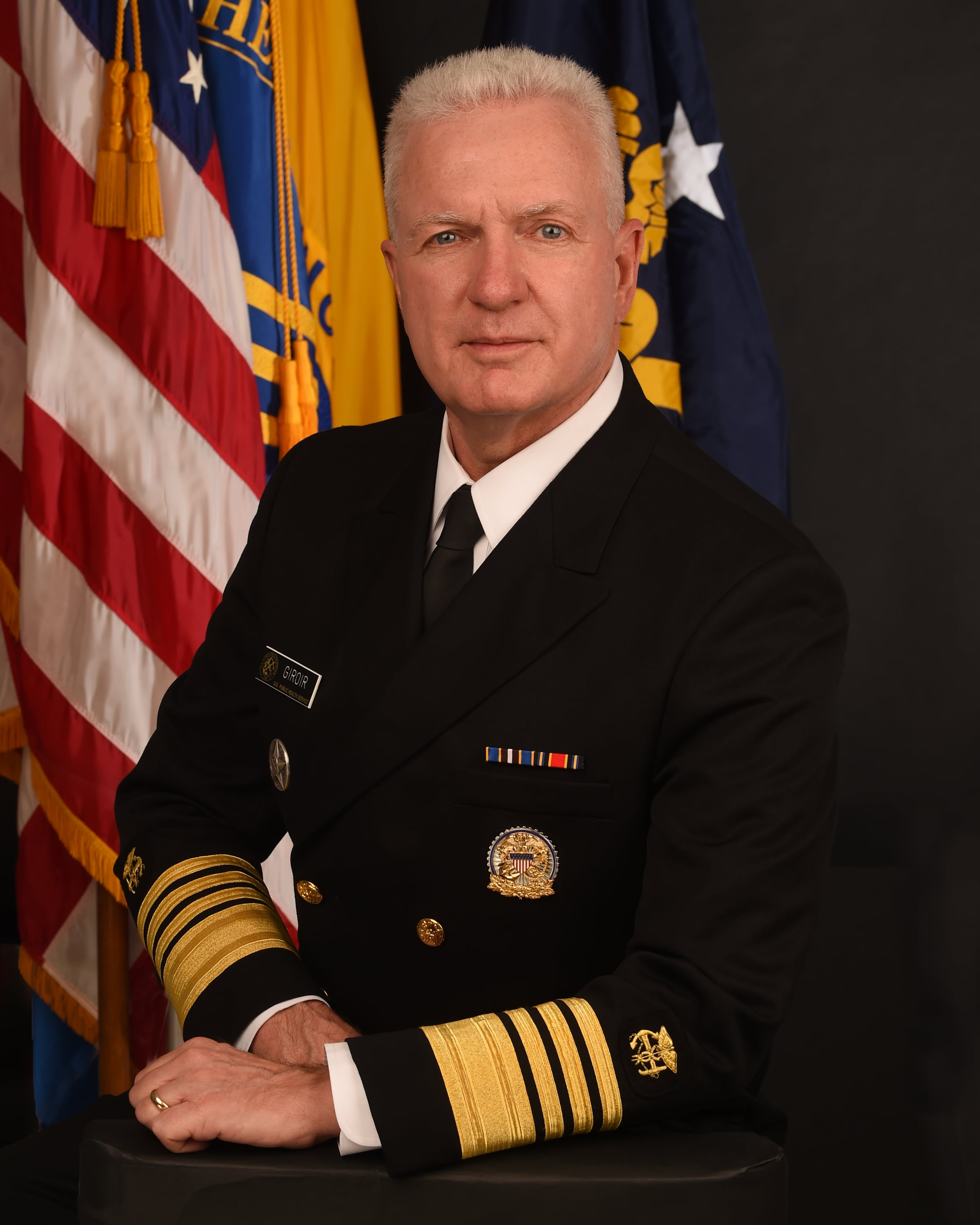
- Official portrait, 2018

16th Assistant Secretary for Health
- In office 15 February 2018 – 19 January 2021
- President: Donald Trump
- Secretary: Alex Azar
- Preceded by: Howard Koh
- Succeeded by: Rachel Levine

Acting Commissioner of Food and Drugs
- In office 6 November 2019 – 17 December 2019
- President: Donald Trump
- Preceded by: Norman Sharpless (acting)
- Succeeded by: Stephen Hahn

Personal details
- Born: 4 November 1960 (age 65) Marrero, Louisiana, U.S.
- Education: Harvard University (BA); University of Texas Southwestern (MD)
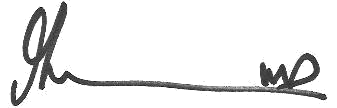
- Signature
- Uniformed service
- Allegiance: United States
- Branch: United States Public Health Service Commissioned Corps
- Service years: 2018–2021
- Rank: Admiral

Brett Paul Giroir (pronounced jir-WAH) (born 4 November 1960) is an American pediatrician. He was formerly the U.S. assistant secretary for health, a four-star admiral in the U.S. Public Health Service Commissioned Corps and an acting Food and Drug Administration commissioner.

From 2004 to 2008, Giroir served as the deputy director, and then a director, of DARPA's Defense Science Office, vice chancellor for the Texas A&M University System from 2008 to 2013, and as the chief executive officer of the Texas A&M Health Science Center from 2013 to 2015.

Giroir starting in 2016 served as president and CEO of ViraCyte, LLC, a clinical-stage biopharmaceutical company focused on discovering and developing cellular immunotherapies for severe infections. He also served as a senior fellow at the Texas Medical Center Health Policy Institute and strategic advisor for the Texas Medical Center Innovation Institute (TMCII). He was a member of the Texas Task Force for Infectious Disease Preparedness and Response, and an adjunct professor of pediatrics at the Baylor College of Medicine in Houston.

Giroir served as the Acting Commissioner of Food and Drugs in November and December 2019, while Stephen Hahn's nomination was pending in the Senate.

== Education ==
Giroir graduated from all-male Catholic Jesuit High School in New Orleans, Louisiana, where he was also served as a drill team commander in the U.S. Marine Corps JROTC. He received his A.B. degree in biology from Harvard University, magna cum laude, in 1982. He was the first to attend college in his family. Giroir earned his M.D. from the University of Texas Southwestern Medical Center (UTSW) in Dallas, Texas, in 1986, inducted into the Alpha Omega Alpha honor society, and served his residency (1986–1989), chief residency (1989–1990) and fellowship (1990–1991) in pediatrics at the medical center, at Children's Medical Center Dallas and Parkland Memorial Hospital. Giroir received his post-doctoral training at the Howard Hughes Medical Institute in Dallas, from 1991 to 1993.

== Career ==
=== University of Texas Southwestern Medical Center ===
Following his fellowship, Giroir served on the faculty at UTSW (1993–2004), becoming a tenured professor. He was the inaugural holder of the Associates First Capital Corporation Distinguished Chair in Pediatrics, and the Kathryne and Gene Bishop Distinguished Chair in Pediatric Care. His administrative positions included director of the Division of Pediatric Critical Care Medicine and director of the pediatric intensive care units at Children's Medical Center and Parkland. In 2000, Giroir was named the associate dean for Clinical Affairs at UTSW, while taking on the role as the inaugural chief medical officer at Children's Medical Center Dallas. Giroir led a medical staff of over 750 physicians. His research focused on severe life-threatening infectious diseases, including meningococcal disease ("the college meningitis"). Giroir's research was featured on a PBS NOVA entitled "Killer Disease on Campus" which originally aired in 2002. Giroir has published over 85 academic articles, chapters, and books on a variety of topics including host-pathogen interactions and novel therapies for life-threatening infectious diseases.

=== Government (1999–2010) ===
==== Defense Sciences Research Council ====
While continuing to serve full-time at UTSW, Giroir was a member of the Defense Sciences Research Council (DSRC, 1999–2004), an academic and technical assessment council charged with assisting DARPA (the Defense Advanced Research Projects Agency) in developing novel, world-changing R&D initiatives. Giroir co-chaired or participated in studies related to biological weapons decontamination and universal medial countermeasures to biological threats during his appointment with the DSRC.

==== Defense Advanced Research Projects Agency ====
In 2004, Giroir accepted a full-time position at DARPA as deputy director of the Defense Sciences Office (DSO), and then as its director from 2007 to 2008. Among the programs begun during this time were a biodefense thrust known as Accelerating Critical Therapeutics and programs in fundamental mathematics, engineering, and human performance. During Giroir's tenure, the DSO developed various biodefense programs and other programs related to biosecurity with the goal of developing new technologies and approaches to be transitioned for translation by other agencies.

==== Defense Sciences Study Group ====
Giroir was also selected as a member of the Defense Sciences Study Group, a two-year program to develop emerging leaders in science and technology. He was a member of the external advisory board, NASA National Center for Space Biological Technologies (2003–2007), and the chair on the Chemical and Biological Defense Panel (2009–2010) for the Threat Reduction Advisory Committee (TRAC).

=== Texas A&M University System ===
Giroir served as vice chancellor for research (2008–2011), vice chancellor for strategic initiatives (2011–2013), and executive vice president and CEO of the Texas A&M Health Science Center (2013–2015). He held professor appointments in the Texas A&M College of Medicine and the Dwight Look College of Engineering, and an adjunct professor appointment at The Bush School of Government and Public Service. Giroir's focus was leading the development of the biotechnology initiatives within the Texas A&M University System and the Biocorridor in Brazos County. In this regard, Giroir was the lead investigator and program director for the design, development, and implementation of the National Center for Therapeutics Manufacturing (NCTM), a biopharmaceutical research and development program at Texas A&M University.

Giroir from 2014 to 2015 chaired the independent Blue Ribbon Panel for the Veterans Choice Act, whose assessment and recommendations to reform the Veterans Administration Health System were delivered to Congress and Secretary Robert McDonald in September 2015. He testified to the House Committee on Veterans Affairs the following month and communicated priorities for VA reform.

Giroir was told on 1 June 2015, that he had 30 minutes to resign or he would be fired. Giroir chose to resign, after eight years of work on several vaccine projects. The notification stated that he had to leave the building immediately, and would no longer have access to his email. His annual performance evaluation at Texas A&M said that he was "more interested in promoting yourself" than the health science center where he worked. He got low marks on being a "team player." Robin Robinson, who was the director of the federal Biomedical Advanced Research and Development Authority and oversaw a major grant for the Texas vaccine project, said Giroir "over-promised and under-delivered." Texas A&M Health Science Center doubled its NIH funding during Giroir's tenure, though the university stated that most of the credit for that was not the function of the work of Giroir, but rather of others, and there was concern that plans to build a teaching hospital on the College Station campus never materialized.

=== Health Science and Biosecurity Partners ===
After resigning from Texas A&M, Giroir founded sole proprietorship Health Science and Biosecurity Partners, a consulting firm focused on life science innovation, strategy, and investments.

Starting in November 2016, Giroir served as president and CEO of ViraCyte, LLC, a clinical-stage biopharmaceutical company focused on discovering and developing cellular immunotherapies for severe infections.

=== Government (2017–2021) ===
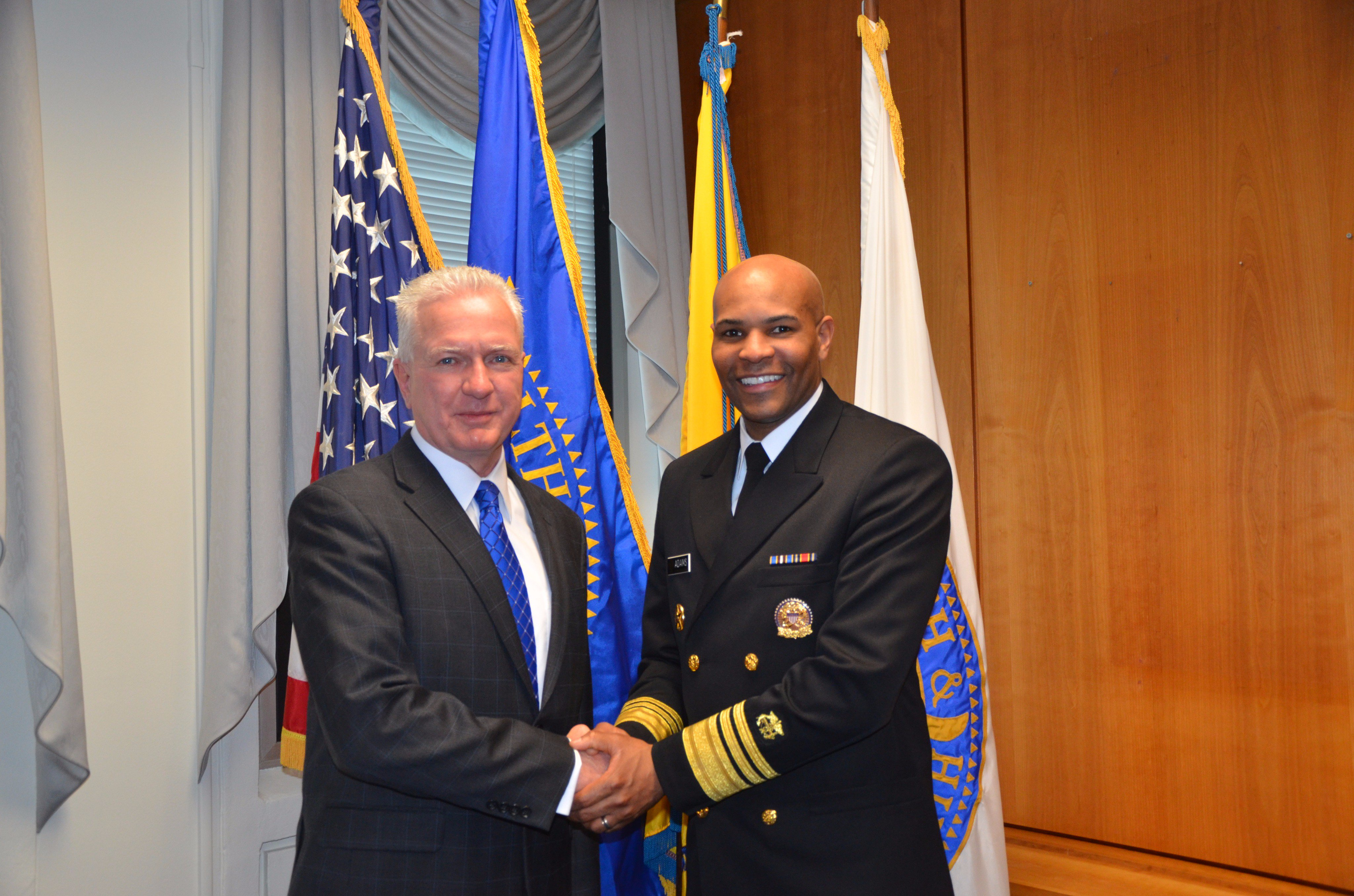
Giroir with Surgeon General of the United States Jerome Adams after being sworn in as assistant secretary for health, 15 February 2018

==== Assistant Secretary for Health ====
President Donald Trump nominated Giroir for appointment as a commissioned officer, and appointment to the rank of admiral in the U.S. Public Health Service Commissioned Corps, while serving as the assistant secretary for health, on 25 May 2017. In August 2017, the Senate committee on Health, Education, Labor and Pensions held up Giroir's confirmation, due to skepticism over his testimony that he would support women's health programs. The Senate returned his nomination back to the President on 3 January 2018, without action. He was renominated on 8 January 2018, and confirmed via voice vote on 7 February 2018.

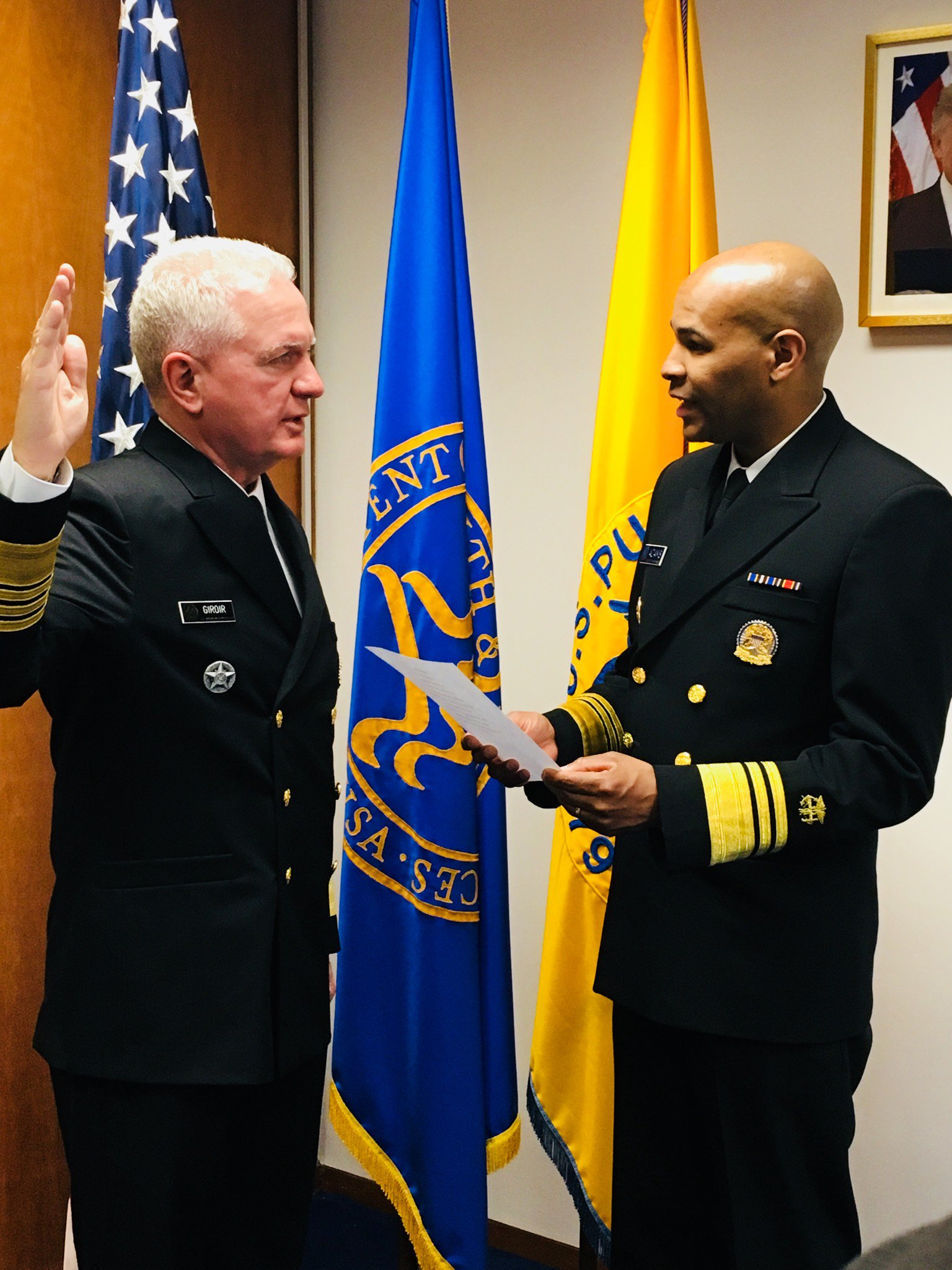
Admiral Brett Giroir being administered the commissioned officer's oath while being sworn in by U.S. Surgeon General Vice Admiral Jerome Adams, February 2018

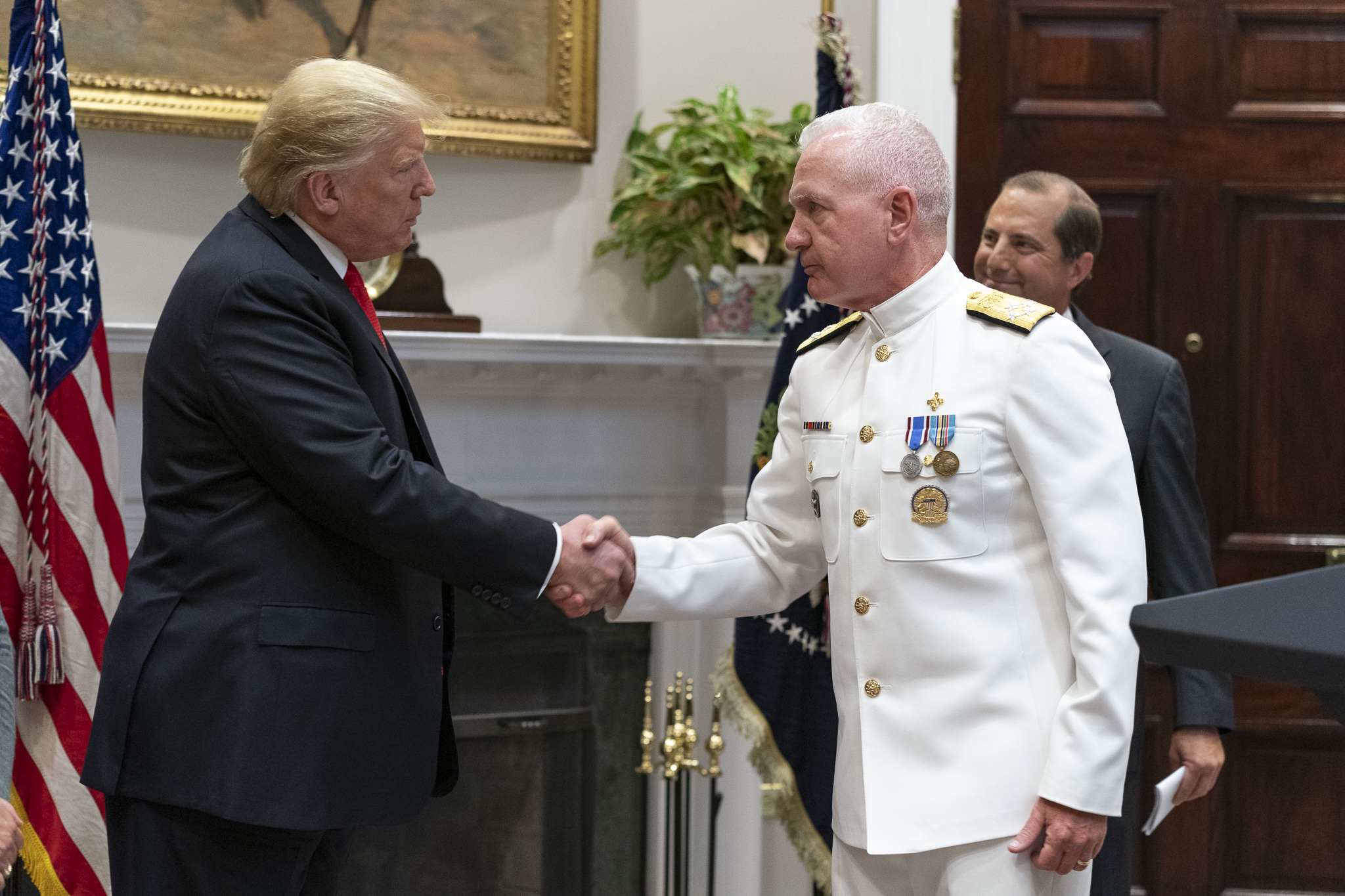
Admiral Brett Giroir, as Assistant Secretary for Health, shakes hands with President Donald Trump in 2019

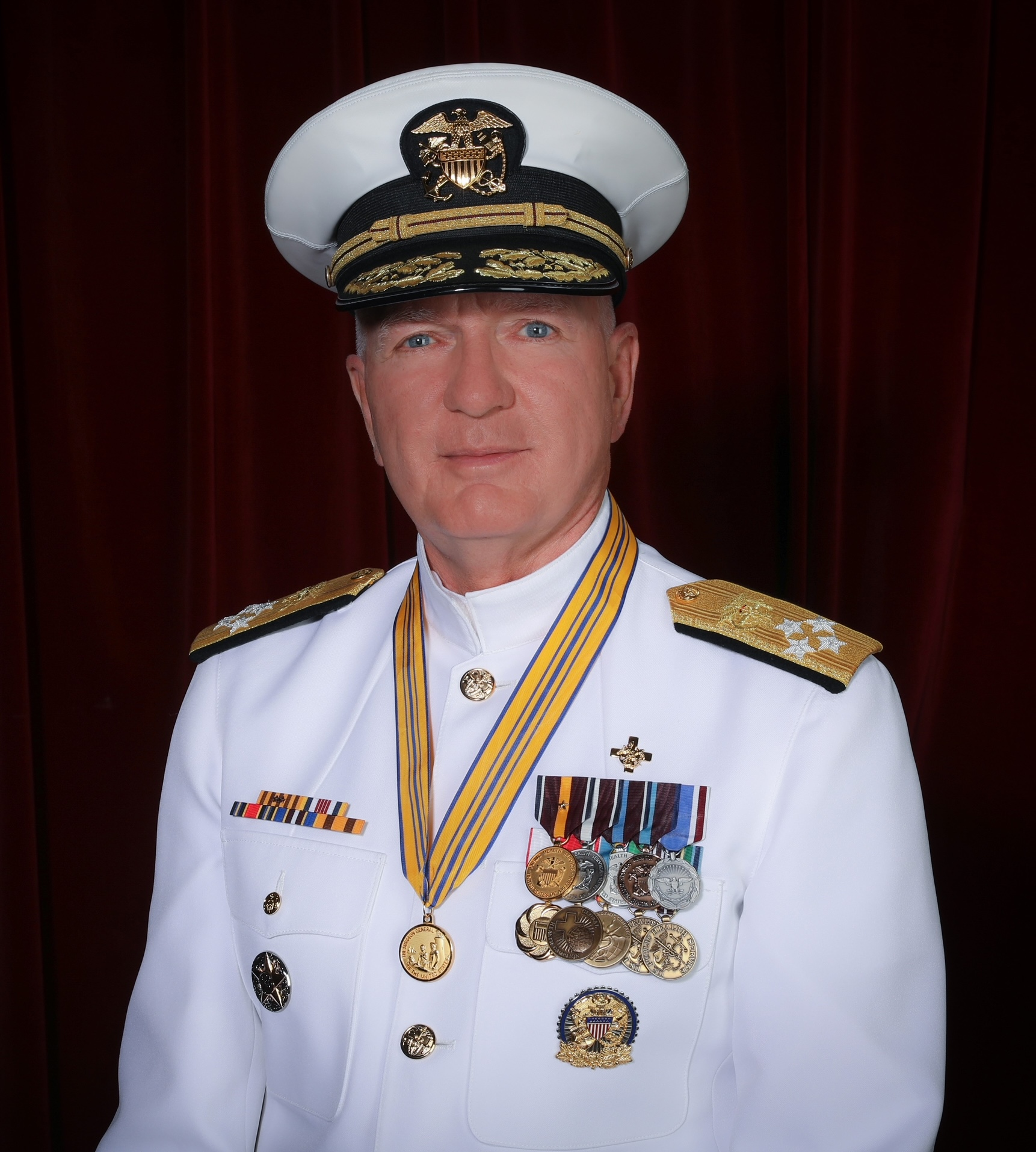
Admiral Brett Giroir in full dress whites, circa 2021

Giroir received his commission and four-star rank in the commissioned corps, a week after he assumed the office of assistant secretary on 15 February 2018. He was also appointed by the secretary to the additional role as mental health senior adviser on 29 March 2018.

In April 2018, Senator Ron Wyden (D-Oregon) criticized Giroir for neglecting to address the role of drug companies in sparking the opioid crisis. In September 2018, Senator Claire McCaskill (D-Missouri) wrote to Health Secretary Alex Azar: "At a hearing of the Senate Committee on Finance in April 2018, I asked Admiral Brett P. Giroir ... whether HHS had demanded explanations from pharmaceutical manufacturers that had raised prices for the opioid-reversal drug naloxone. Admiral Giroir stated he had not asked the companies to explain their dramatic price increases, but promised he would 'get back to [me] on whether [he] could write a letter.' I am not aware, however, of outreach from HHS to my office on this issue."

In November 2018, Giroir wrote a letter in which he said that the agency was seeking to end the use of fetal tissue in taxpayer-funded biomedical research involving developing vaccines and researching the Zika virus, and treatments for Alzheimer's disease and Parkinson's, if it can find "adequate alternatives", and said the HHS was "pro-life and pro-science". The National Institutes of Health at the time funded more than $100 million in research drawing on fetal tissue.

In May 2020, Senator Mitt Romney (R-Utah) criticized Giroir at a Senate health committee hearing for his participation in a White House event celebrating that the U.S. had conducted more coronavirus tests than South Korea. Romney said the difference was that South Korea tested early, and the U.S. was catching up—which could result in many more American deaths. Romney said: "I understand that politicians are going to frame data in a way that is most positive politically. Of course, I don't expect that from admirals. But you ignored the fact that they accomplished theirs at the beginning of the outbreak, while we treaded water during February and March.... The fact is their test numbers are going down, down, down now, because they don't have the kind of outbreak we have. Ours are going up, up, up...."

==== Acting Commissioner of Food and Drugs ====
On 1 November 2019, HHS Secretary Alex Azar announced that Giroir would serve as Acting Commissioner of Food and Drugs until Stephen Hahn, whose nomination for the same position was announced on the same day, was confirmed by the U.S. Senate. Senator Patty Murray (D-Washington) said that she was "alarmed" by Giroir's "track record of letting ideology drive decisions at the expense of women and families." Giroir served as Acting Commissioner in November and December 2019, while Hahn's nomination was pending in the Senate.

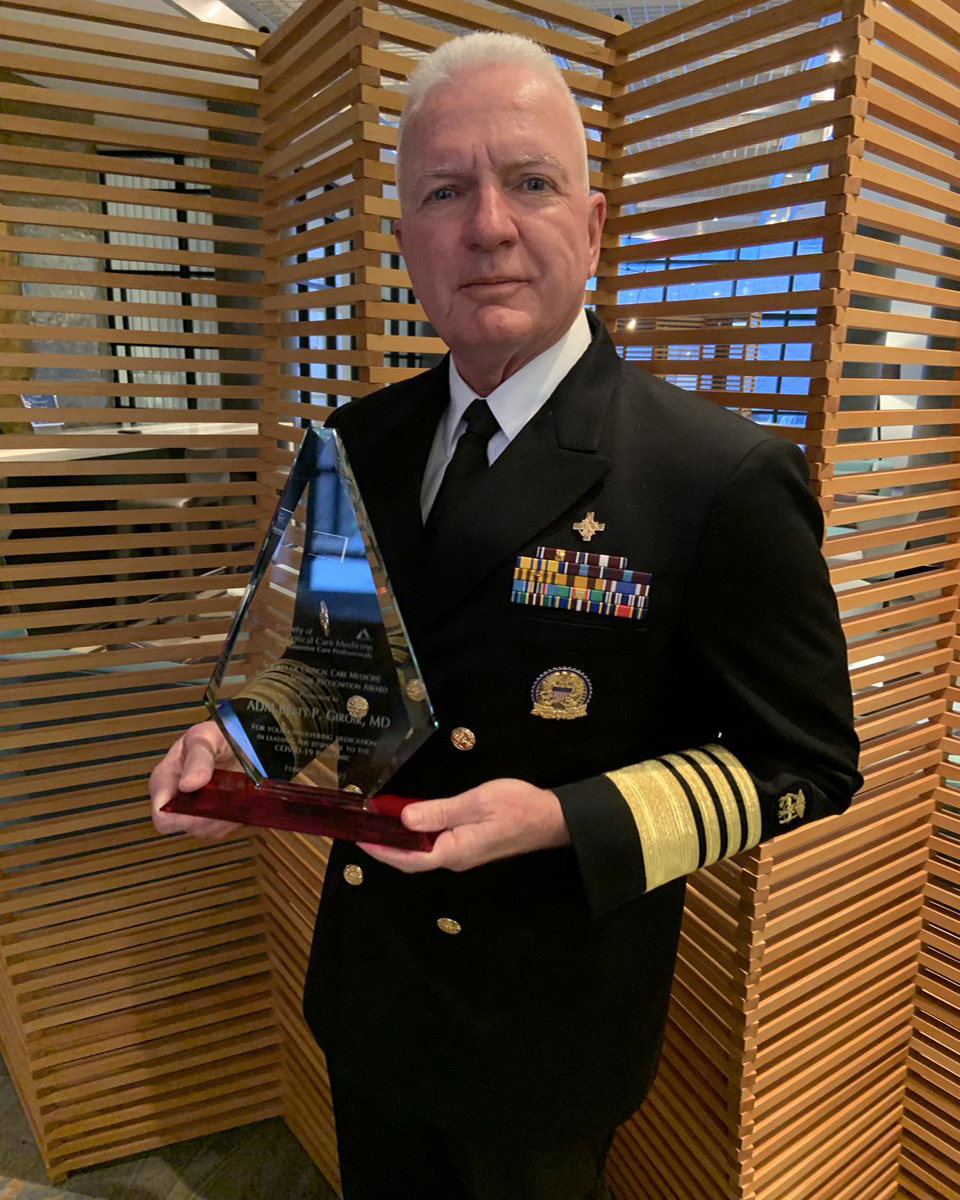
Admiral Brett Giroir during his final days in the U.S. Public Health Service in January 2021

==== U.S. Representative on the WHO Executive Board ====
On 15 November 2018, President Trump nominated Giroir to serve the additional role of representative of the United States on the executive board of the World Health Organization. The nomination was returned to the president on 3 January 2019, without action by the Senate. He was renominated on January 16, 2019, but that nomination was also returned to the president on 3 January 2020, without action. He was renominated for a third time on 18 March 2020. Giroir was finally confirmed by the Senate in a voice vote on 7 May 2020. He served on the executive board, for the remainder of the current three-year term cycle, which expired in January 2021.

Giroir resigned from his government positions on 19 January 2021, as expected from all appointed government leadership, in order to facilitate a smooth transition to the new Biden administration.

== Other appointments and activities ==
Giroir served on the scientific advisory boards of the Cancer Moonshots Program at MD Anderson Cancer Center, the A. Alfred Taubman Medical Research Institute at the University of Michigan, the Institute for Patient Safety at the University of North Texas Health Science Center, and was a member of the board of directors of Esperance Pharmaceuticals and BioHouston.

He appeared before the House Armed Services Committee Subcommittee on Intelligence, Emerging Threats and Capabilities hearing on Biodefense: Worldwide Threats and Countermeasure Efforts for the Department of Defense in October 2013.

On 6 October 2014, Governor Rick Perry announced the creation of the Texas Task Force on Infectious Disease Preparedness and Response to assess and enhance the state's existing capabilities to prepare for and respond to pandemic diseases such as the Ebola virus. The Governor named Giroir as director of the task force to lead a team of experts in epidemiology and infectious disease.

== Uniformed service awards and decorations ==
Giroir is the recipient of the following awards and decorations:

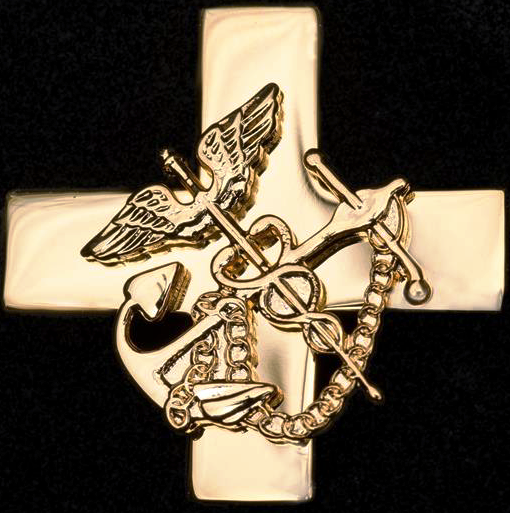

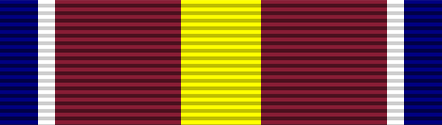

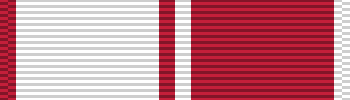

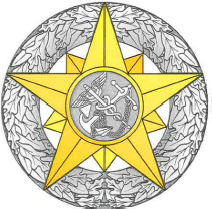
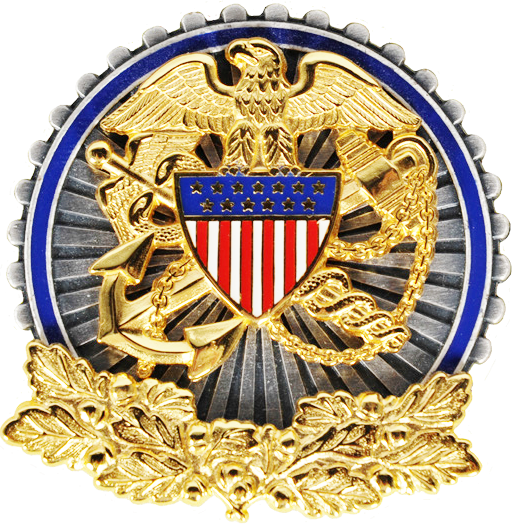

Badge	Field Medical Readiness Badge		
1st row	Public Health Service Distinguished Service Medal with gold 5/16 inch star		
2nd row	Public Health Service Meritorious Service Medal	Surgeon General's Medallion	Public Health Service Outstanding Service Medal
3rd row	Public Health Service Achievement Medal	Public Health Service Presidential Unit Citation	Assistant Secretary for Preparedness and Response Pinnacle Medal
4th row	Public Health Service Outstanding Unit Citation with two bronze service star	Public Health Service Unit Commendation	Secretary of Defense Medal for Outstanding Public Service
5th row	Public Health Service Global Health Campaign Medal	Public Health Service COVID-19 Pandemic Campaign Medal with Expeditionary Attachment	Public Health Service Special Assignment Award
6th row	Public Health Service Crisis Response Service Award	Public Health Service Regular Corps Ribbon	Commissioned Corps Training Ribbon
Badges	Assistant Secretary for Health Officer-in-Charge Badge		Office of the Secretary of Health and Human Services Badge

Government offices
Preceded by Howard Koh	Assistant Secretary for Health; 2018–2021	Succeeded by Rachel Levine
