= Jerome Adams =

American anesthesiologist and 20th Surgeon General of the United States (born 1974)

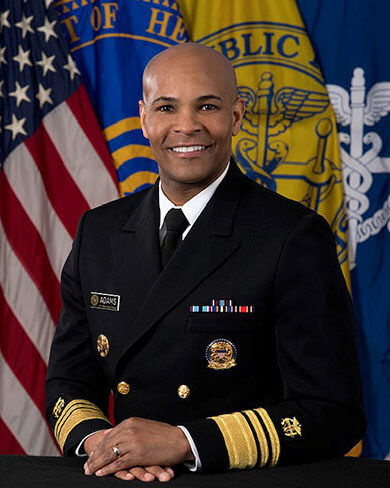
- Official portrait, 2019

20th Surgeon General of the United States
- In office September 5, 2017 – January 20, 2021
- President: Donald Trump
- Deputy: Sylvia Trent-Adams; Erica Schwartz
- Preceded by: Vivek Murthy
- Succeeded by: Vivek Murthy

Health Commissioner of Indiana
- In office October 22, 2014 – September 5, 2017
- Governor: Mike Pence; Eric Holcomb
- Preceded by: William VanNess
- Succeeded by: Kristina Box

Personal details
- Born: Jerome Michael Adams; September 22, 1974 (age 52) Mechanicsville, Maryland, U.S.
- Party: Independent
- Spouse: Lacey Adams
- Children: 3
- Education: University of Maryland (BA, BS); Indiana University (MD); University of California, Berkeley (MPH)
- Uniformed service
- Allegiance: United States
- Branch: PHS Commissioned Corps
- Service years: 2017–2021
- Rank: Vice Admiral
- Jerome Adams's voice Jerome Adams speaks on Opioid Abuse; Recorded June 13, 2019

Jerome Michael Adams (born September 22, 1974) is an American anesthesiologist and a former vice admiral in the U.S. Public Health Service Commissioned Corps who served as the 20th surgeon general of the United States from September 5, 2017, until January 20, 2021. Before becoming Surgeon General, he served as the Indiana state health commissioner, from 2014 to 2017.

On June 29, 2017, President Donald Trump nominated Adams to become Surgeon General of the United States. Adams was confirmed by the United States Senate on August 3, 2017. Adams' tenure as Surgeon General coincided with the onset of the COVID-19 pandemic.

== Early life and education ==
Adams is the son of Richard and Edrena Adams of Mechanicsville, Maryland, and grew up on the family farm. He attended Chopticon High School, graduating in 1992, in the top 5% of his class. He then attended the University of Maryland Baltimore County through a full-tuition Meyerhoff Scholarship, a grant dedicated to minority students interested in the sciences. Adams received his Bachelor of Science in biochemistry and his Bachelor of Arts in biopsychology. Additionally, Adams studied abroad in the Netherlands and Zimbabwe.

Adams attended medical school at Indiana University School of Medicine as an Eli Lilly and Company Scholar. He also received a Master of Public Health degree from the University of California, Berkeley, in 2000, with a focus on chronic disease prevention. Adams completed his internship in internal medicine (2002–2003) at St. Vincent Indianapolis Hospital and his residency in anesthesiology (2003–2006) at Indiana University. He is board certified in anesthesiology.

== Career ==
=== Private practice and academia ===
After two years in private practice at Ball Memorial Hospital, Adams was named assistant professor of anesthesiology at Indiana University. He has written several academic papers and book chapters, including chapters in Anesthesia Student Survival Guide: A Case-based Approach, and an editorial in the American Journal of Public Health, "Are Pain Management Questions in Patient Satisfaction Surveys Driving the Opioid Epidemic?"

=== Indiana state health commissioner ===
In October 2014, Adams was appointed Indiana state health commissioner. He was originally appointed by Governor Mike Pence and re-appointed by newly elected governor Eric Holcomb in 2017. In this role, he oversaw the Public Health Protection and Laboratory Services, Health and Human Services, Health Care Quality and Regulatory, and Tobacco Prevention and Cessation Commissions. He also served as Secretary of Indiana State Department of Health's executive board, as Chairman of the Indiana State Trauma Care Committee, as President of the Healthy Hoosier Foundation, and as co-chairman of the Indiana Perinatal Quality Improvement Collaborative Governing Council. During an HIV epidemic in 2015, Adams initially opposed needle-exchange programs on "moral" grounds, but he later changed his position as cases continued to mount.

=== Surgeon General of the United States ===
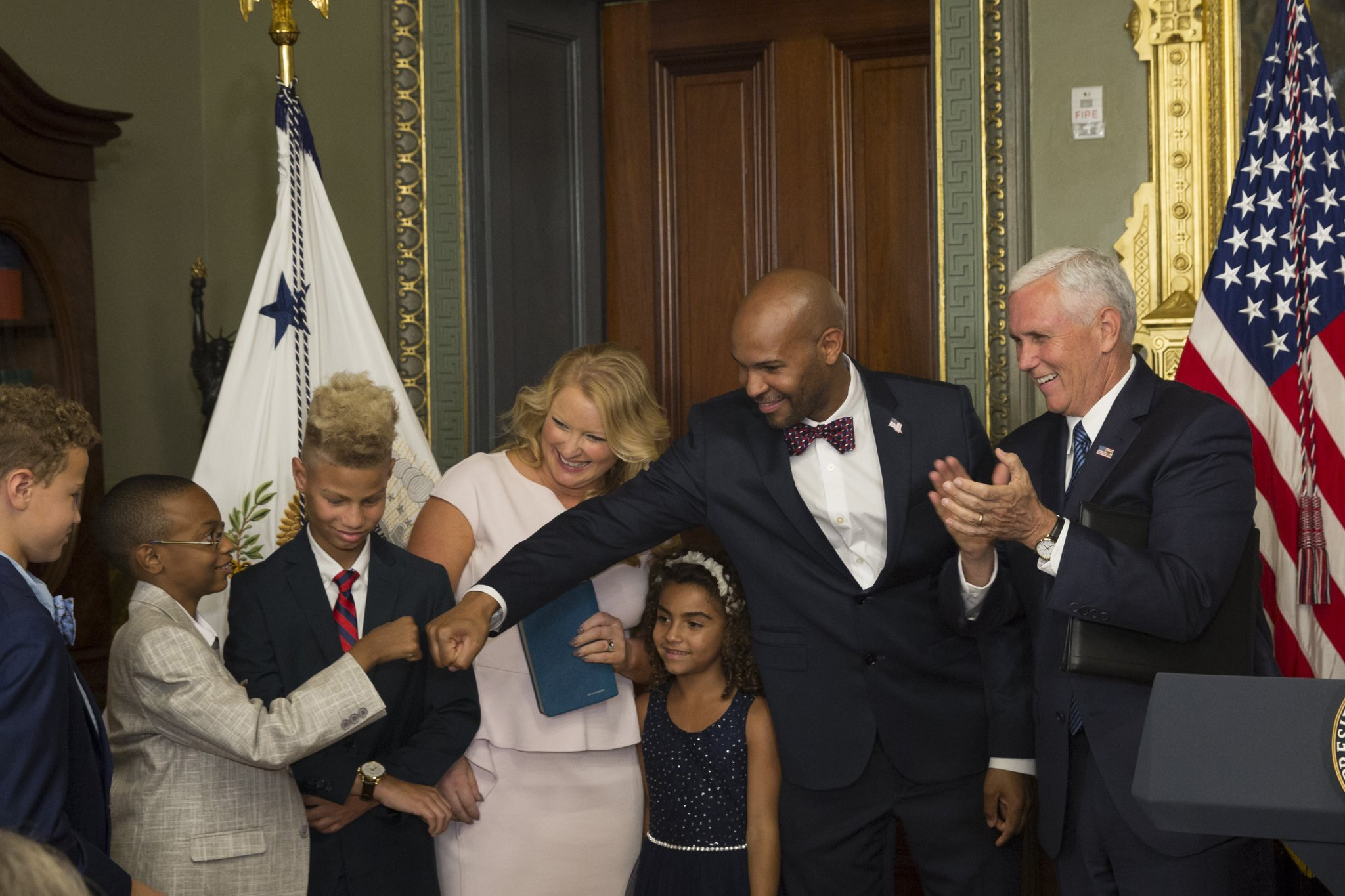
U.S. vice president Mike Pence swearing in Adams as U.S. Surgeon General on September 5, 2017.

On June 29, 2017, President Donald Trump nominated Adams as surgeon general of the United States. He was confirmed to the position by the Senate on August 3, 2017. Upon his confirmation, Adams said that addressing the opioid epidemic along with untreated mental illness would be two of his major priorities. Adams was sworn in as surgeon general on September 5, 2017, and received his commission shortly after.

In April 2018, Adams urged Americans who are at risk of overdosing on opioids, as well as their family and friends, to carry an over-the-counter antidote to help combat rising fatalities. In May 2018, Adams responded to an in-flight medical emergency on a flight to Jackson, Mississippi.

In September 2018, Adams began a campaign along with other public health officials to promote seasonal flu vaccinations. The 2017 flu epidemic had resulted in the deaths of an estimated 80,000 Americans, the highest number of deaths in at least four decades, according to CDC director Robert Redfield. Of the 180 children who died, 80 percent were unvaccinated.

==== COVID-19 pandemic ====
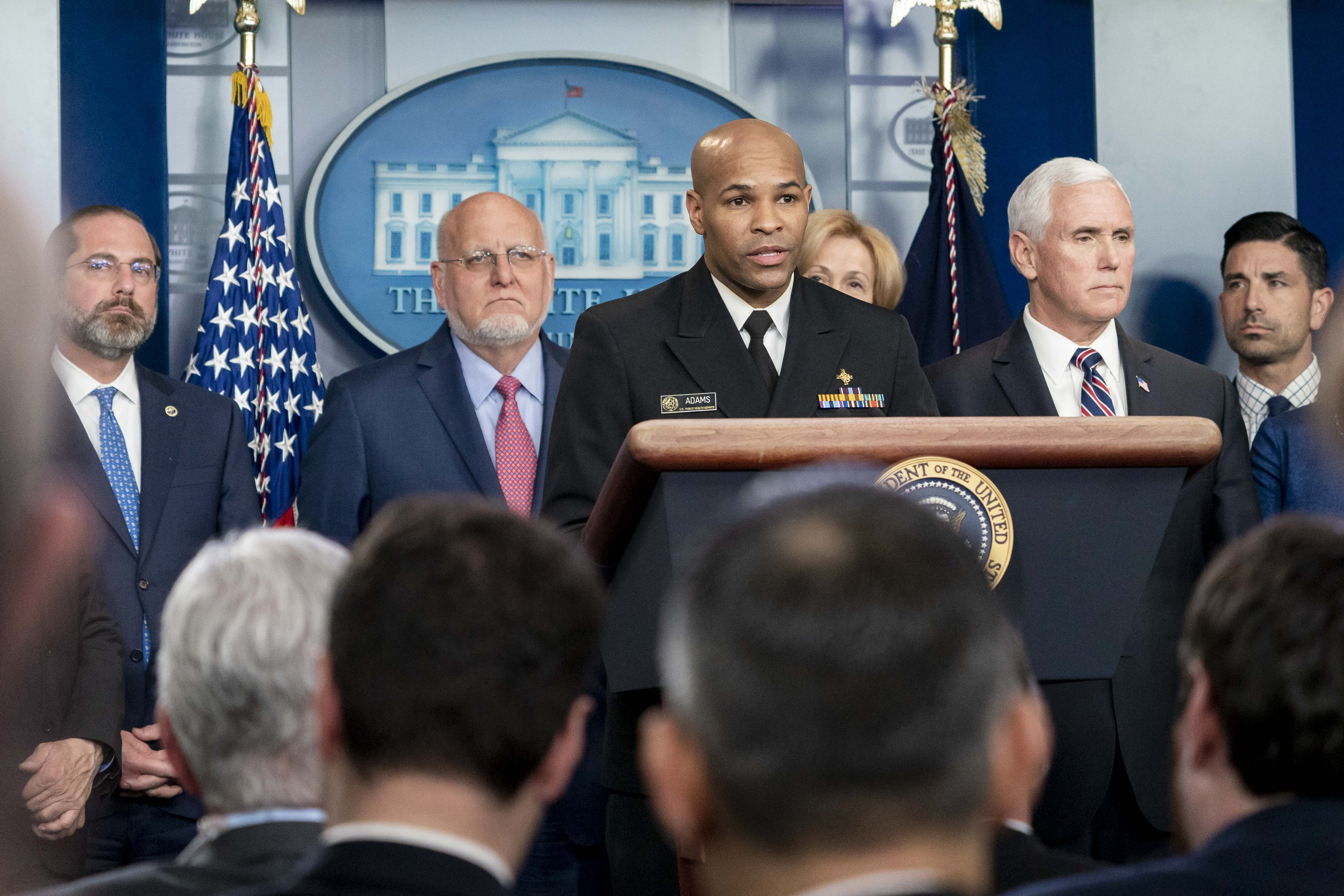
Adams speaking to the White House press corps on COVID-19 in March 2020.

In February 2020, Adams was appointed to the task force for dealing with the COVID-19 pandemic. Adams initially downplayed the risk from COVID-19 by comparing it to the flu, which was criticized by experts. He also strongly implored people not to buy or use face masks because he said they were “NOT effective” in preventing the general public from catching COVID-19, and that wearing a mask could actually increase the risk of catching the virus if the person did not wear the mask correctly and touched their face. This was in line with other United States Public Health officials, including Anthony Fauci, who later admitted his recommendation was not based on science but rather to prevent shortages for doctors and other health professionals.

Adams later retracted this recommendation because he said there was new information about the asymptomatic spread of the virus. Politico reported in April 2020 that Adams had been largely sidelined by the administration.

When asked about African-Americans’ increased risks from COVID, Adams replied that “African-Americans and Latinos should avoid alcohol, drugs and tobacco. Do it for your abuela, do it for your granddaddy, do it for your big momma, do it for your pop-pop.” Public health experts criticized his assertions as misleading and lacking adequate context.

Adams expressed concern that the George Floyd protests could lead to a spike in COVID-19 cases. According to Adams, "Based on the way the disease spreads, there is every reason to expect that we will see new clusters and potentially new outbreaks moving forward."

Adams confirmed that he was asked to step down as Surgeon General by the incoming Biden administration. Former surgeon general Vivek Murthy took his place. He officially resigned on January 20, 2021, at the request of President Joe Biden.

=== Subsequent career ===
Following his service as surgeon general, Adams joined Purdue University in October 2021 as a Presidential Fellow and its first executive director of health equity initiatives, professor of practice in the departments of Pharmacy Practice and Public Health, and a faculty member of the Regenstrief Center for Healthcare Engineering. Having been part of the Trump administration, he described how this made it difficult to obtain a position in academia or the corporate world.

== Personal life ==
Adams is Catholic, and he and his wife Lacey have three children.

== Awards and decorations ==
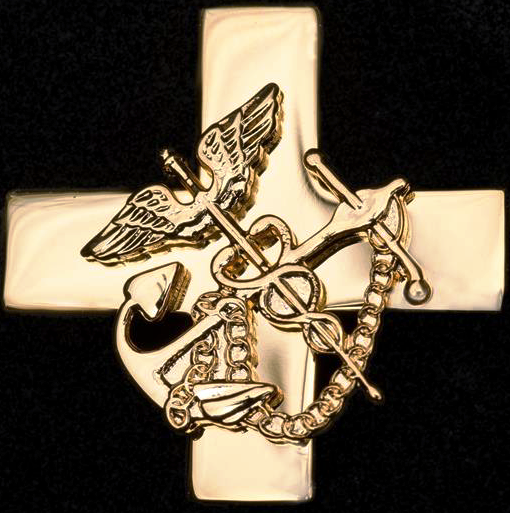
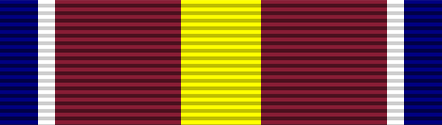
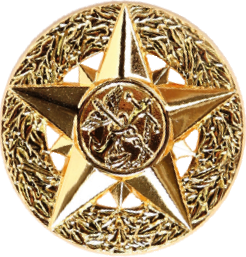
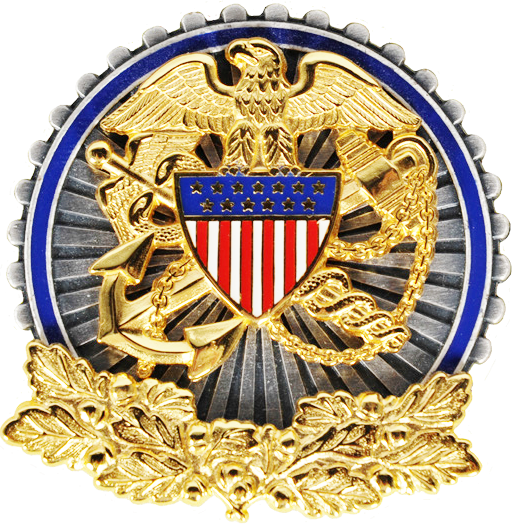

Field Medical Readiness Badge
Public Health Service Distinguished Service Medal		Public Health Service Meritorious Service Medal
Public Health Service Outstanding Service Medal	Public Health Service Outstanding Unit Citation with bronze service star	Public Health Service Unit Commendation
Public Health Service Global Health Campaign Medal	Public Health Service COVID-19 Pandemic Campaign Medal	Public Health Service Crisis Response Service Award
Humanitarian Service Medal	Public Health Service Regular Corps Ribbon	Commissioned Corps Training Ribbon
Surgeon General Badge		Office of the Secretary of Health and Human Services Badge

Military offices
Preceded by Vivek Murthy	Surgeon General of the United States; 2017–2021	Succeeded by Vivek Murthy
