= Public Health Service Ebola Campaign Medal =

Decoration of the U.S. Public Health Service

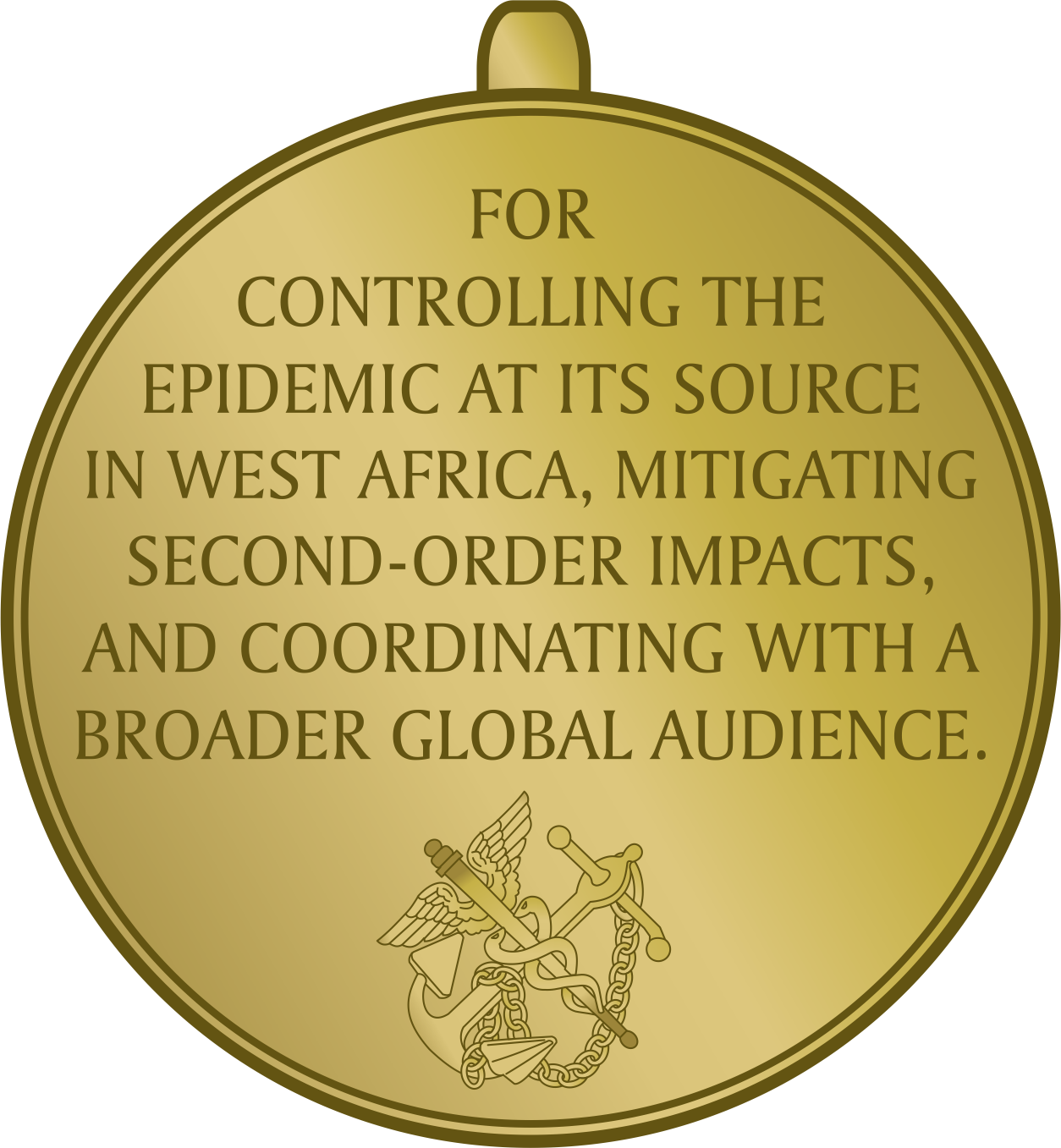
- The obverse (left) and reverse sides of the medal.
- Type: Service award
- Awarded for: Service during an international Ebola activation of the USPHS Commissioned Corps
- Country: United States
- Presented by: United States Public Health Service
- Eligibility: Members of the United States Public Health Service Commissioned Corps
- Ribbon of the PHS Ebola Campaign Medal

Precedence
- Next (higher): Global Health Campaign Medal
- Next (lower): COVID-19 Pandemic Campaign Medal

The Public Health Service Ebola Campaign Medal is a decoration of the United States Public Health Service presented to members of the United States Public Health Service Commissioned Corps. It recognizes service in responding to an outbreak of the Ebola virus.

== Criteria ==
The PHS Ebola Campaign Medal is awarded to officers who served on or after 31 March 2014 for a period of not less than 30 consecutive days or 60 non-consecutive days in support of an international Ebola activation of the USPHS Commissioned Corps by the President of the United States or the United States Secretary of Health and Human Services. The Surgeon General of the United States determines which assignments qualify for the medal. An officer may receive only one award of the medal for participation in the same Ebola initiative or mission.

The Surgeon General may authorize other response service awards in conjunction with the Ebola Campaign Medal. Officers must meet the established criteria for awarding the Public Health Service Foreign Duty Award and the Public Health Service Hazardous Duty Award during an Ebola mission. Officers are not authorized to receive any other service awards in conjunction with the Ebola Campaign Medal.

== See also ==
- Awards and decorations of the Public Health Service
- Awards and decorations of the United States government
