= Public Health Service COVID-19 Pandemic Campaign Medal =

Decoration of the U.S. Public Health Service

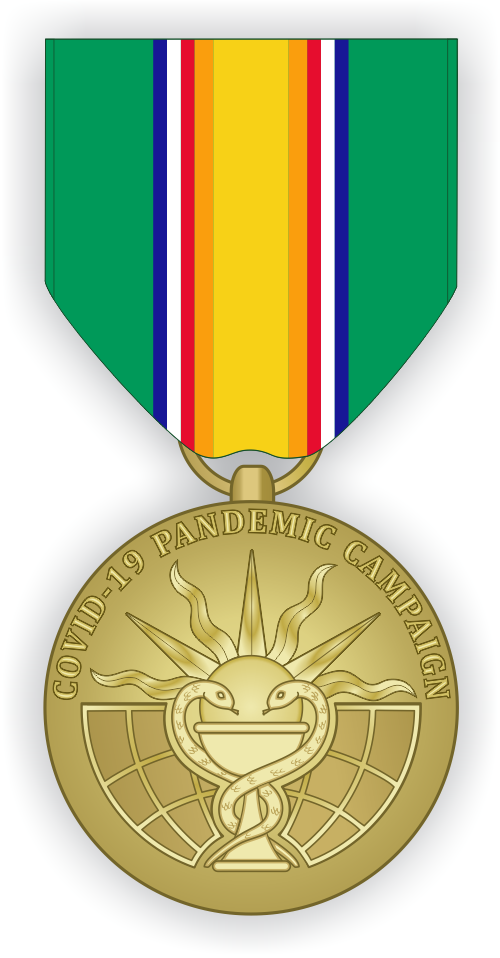
- Type: Service award
- Awarded for: Service during the COVID-19 pandemic
- Country: United States
- Presented by: United States Public Health Service
- Eligibility: Members of the United States Public Health Service Commissioned Corps and certain civilians
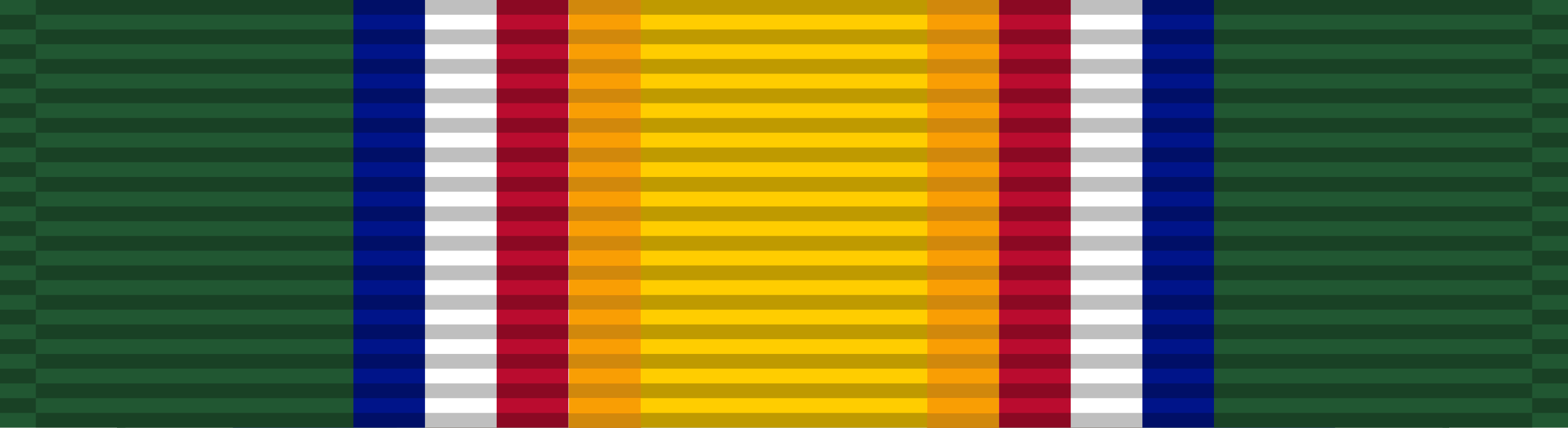
- Ribbon

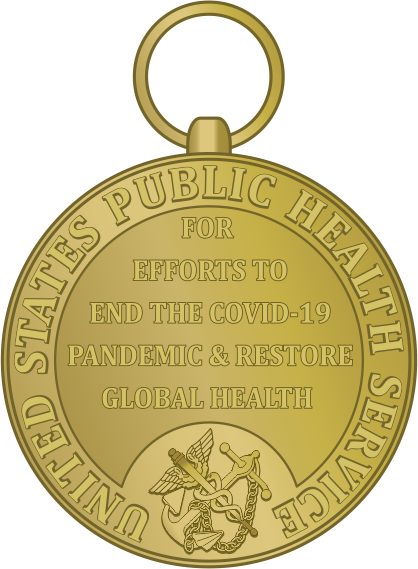
- Reverse

Precedence
- Next (higher): Ebola Campaign Medal
- Next (lower): Hazardous Duty Award

The Public Health Service COVID-19 Pandemic Campaign Medal, or Public Health Service Coronavirus Disease 2019 Pandemic Campaign Medal, is a decoration of the United States Public Health Service presented to members of the United States Public Health Service Commissioned Corps, as well as to civilians who meet certain criteria for eligibility. It recognizes service in response to the COVID-19 pandemic.

== Criteria ==
The PHS COVID-19 Pandemic Campaign Medal is awarded to officers who served on active duty between 18 March 2020 (originally stated as 1 March onward) and 11 May 2023, the Public Health Emergency declaration for COVID-19. An officer may be awarded the medal only once regardless of the number of tours he or she served during the period.

The PHS COVID-19 Pandemic Campaign Medal may not be awarded in conjunction with the Public Health Service Global Health Campaign Medal. However, it may be awarded in conjunction with the Expeditionary Attachment, service awards (such as the Global Health Initiative Service Medal, Special Assignment Award, and Foreign Duty Award), and service response awards (such as the Crisis Response Service Award and the Global Response Service Award) if the officer also met the respective elibility criteria for one or more of those awards.

The Surgeon General of the United States may authorize the issuance of the PHS COVID-19 Pandemic Campaign Medal to civilians who supported the United States Department of Health and Human Service's COVID-19 response for a period of not less than 30 consecutive days or 60 non-consecutive days.

== See also ==
- Awards and decorations of the Public Health Service
- Awards and decorations of the United States government
- Covid-19 Commemorative Medal, Austrian award
- COVID-19 Resilience Medal, Singaporean award
