= Erica Schwartz =

Director of the Centers for Disease Control and Prevention

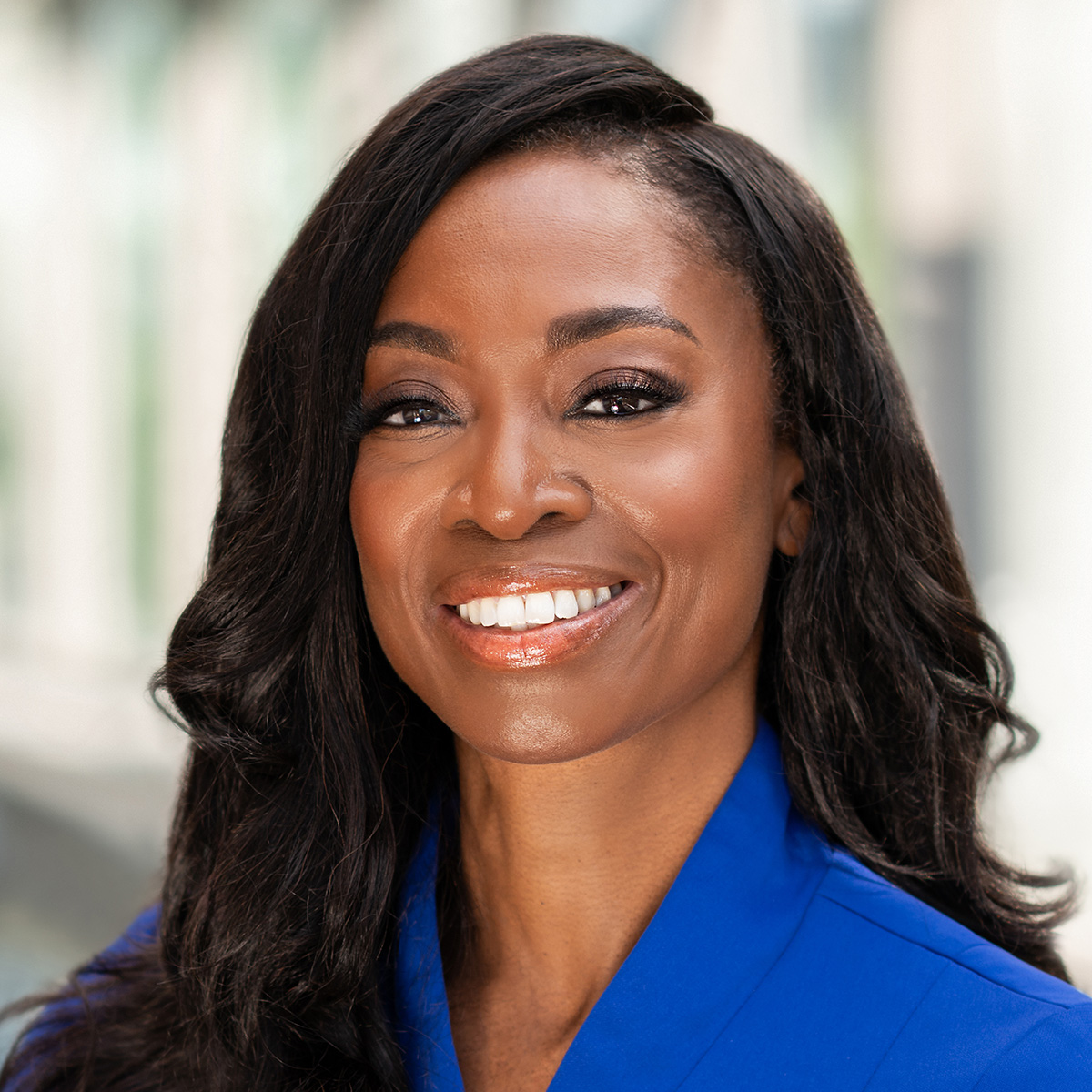
- Official portrait, 2026

22nd Director of the Centers for Disease Control and Prevention
- Incumbent
- Assumed office August 13, 2026
- President: Donald Trump
- Preceded by: Susan Monarez

Deputy Surgeon General of the United States
- In office January 1, 2019 – April 2021
- President: Donald Trump; Joe Biden
- Preceded by: Sylvia Trent-Adams
- Succeeded by: Denise Hinton

Personal details
- Born: Erica G. Schwartz; 1971 or 1972 (age 54–55)
- Spouse: Daniel Schwartz
- Education: Brown University (BS, MD); Uniformed Services University of the Health Sciences (MPH); University of Maryland, Baltimore (JD)
- Awards: Public Health Service Distinguished Service Medal; Legion of Merit; Meritorious Service Medal (2); Surgeon General's Medallion; Coast Guard Commendation Medal; Navy Commendation Medal; Public Health Service Presidential Unit Citation

Military service
- Allegiance: United States
- Branch/service: United States Navy; USPHS Commissioned Corps
- Years of service: 1997–2005 (Navy); 2005–2021 (Public Health Service)
- Rank: Rear admiral
- Commands: Deputy Surgeon General of the United States; Chief Medical Officer, U.S. Coast Guard

Erica G. Schwartz (born 1971 or 1972) is an American health official who is Director of the Centers for Disease Control and Prevention (CDC). She previously served as Deputy Surgeon General from January 2019 to April 2021, with the rank of rear admiral in the U.S. Public Health Service Commissioned Corps.

Prior to this, she served in several positions with the U.S. Coast Guard, including as Chief Medical Officer during 2015–2019, and before that as Chief of Health Services and Chief of Preventive Medicine at the U.S. Coast Guard Headquarters, becoming its principal expert on flu pandemics.

== Early life and education ==
Schwartz's father was a career Navy master chief petty officer stationed in San Diego, and she has three siblings who served in the military. She enrolled in Brown University's eight-year Program in Liberal Medical Education, graduating with a degree in biomedical engineering with a minor in East Asian studies in 1994, and an M.D. in 1998. She was commissioned by the Navy in 1994.

She earned a Master of Public Health degree from the Uniformed Services University of the Health Sciences in 2000, and completed a residency in occupational and environmental medicine there in 2001. Schwartz also earned a Juris Doctor from the University of Maryland Baltimore in 2005, and has been admitted to the District of Columbia Bar.

== Career ==
=== Early career ===
Schwartz was in the U.S. Navy until 2005. She was an occupational medicine physician with postings that included several positions at Naval Medical Clinic Annapolis, including Chief of the Occupational Medicine Clinic and the Immunization Clinic, and Head of the Preventive Medicine Department. Schwartz also served at the Navy and Marine Corps Public Health Center in Portsmouth, Virginia.

In 2005, she transferred from the Navy to the U.S. Public Health Service Commissioned Corps. She served as Chief of Preventive Medicine during 2005–2013 and Chief of Health Services during 2013–2015, at U.S. Coast Guard Headquarters in Washington, DC. She was appointed as the Coast Guard's principal expert on flu pandemics. Schwartz was awarded one Legion of Merit, two Meritorious Service Medals, both the Coast Guard and Navy Commendation Medals, and in 2011 was recognized as one of the Military Health System female physicians of the year.

=== Coast Guard Chief Medical Officer ===
Schwartz was appointed to the rank of rear admiral in the PHS Commissioned Corps and became the U.S. Coast Guard Chief Medical Officer on August 17, 2015. As chief, she concurrently served as the Coast Guard's Director of Health, Safety and Work-Life and had responsibility for managing the service's 42 clinics and 150 sick bays. She oversaw the Coast Guard's environmental health and safety program, focusing on risk management and accident prevention. She also led the service's work-life programs including: child care, culinary services, substance abuse prevention, suicide prevention, sexual assault prevention, personal financial management, ombudsman, health promotion, and employee assistance.

In January 2018, Schwartz testified before the House Transportation Subcommittee on Coast Guard and Maritime Transportation on the need for the service to transition to an electronic health record system, in line with the other services of the U.S. Armed Forces. She stated that the current paper-based record and prescription system did not allow efficient transfer of records from the Coast Guard to the Department of Veterans Affairs.

=== Deputy Surgeon General ===
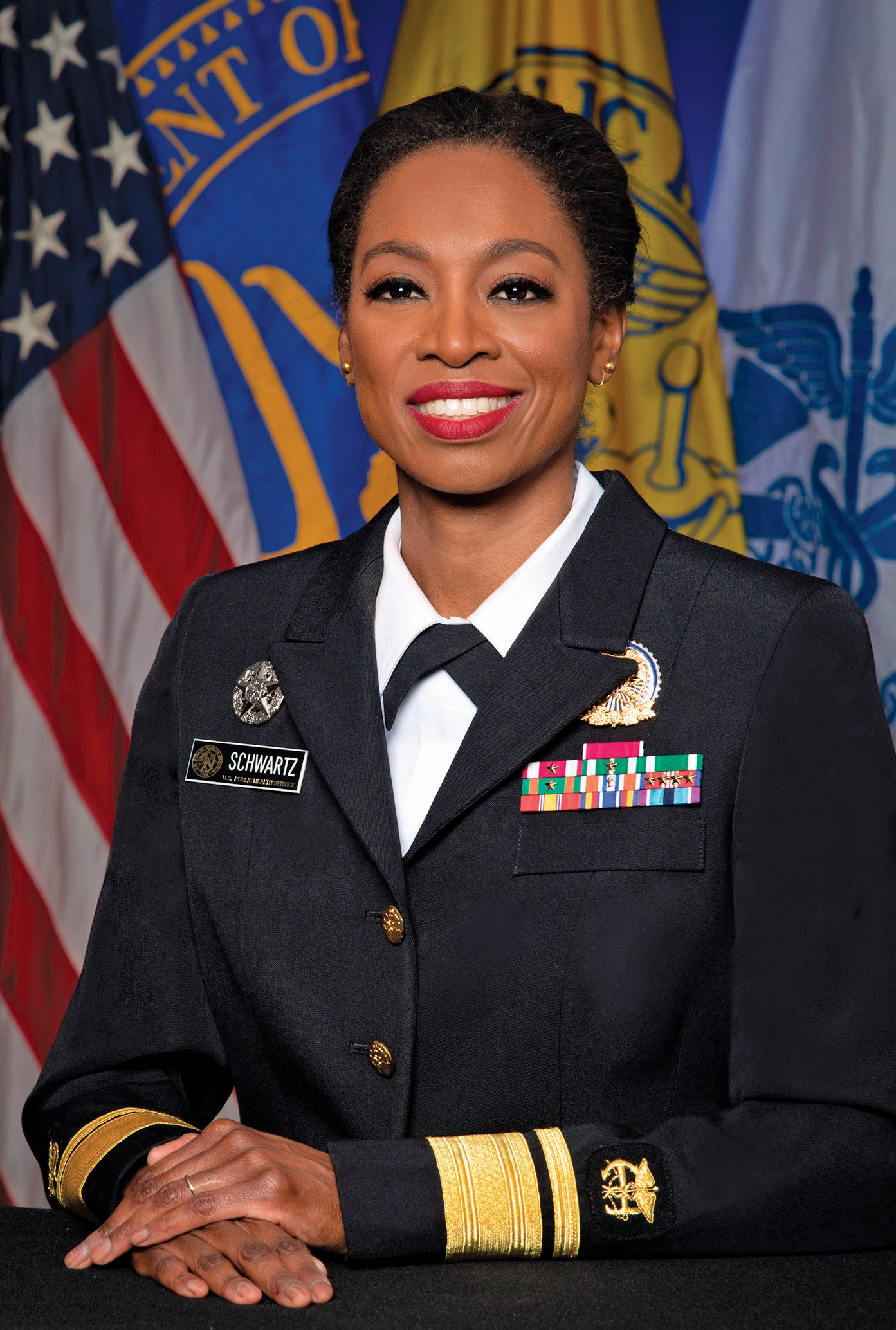
Rear Admiral Schwartz as Deputy Surgeon General in 2019

Schwartz was appointed Deputy Surgeon General on January 1, 2019. She was the point person for the Department of Health and Human Services during the presidential transition from the first Trump administration to the Biden administration. She was not chosen by the incoming Biden administration to serve as Acting Surgeon General, and chose to resign in early 2021, concluding 27 years of combined uniformed service.

=== Private career ===
From 2022 to June 2026, Schwartz was President of Insurance Solutions for Medicare and Retirement at United Healthcare. She additionally joined the board of directors of Georgia-based home care provider Aveanna Healthcare in May 2021, and of medical imaging company Butterfly Network in September 2021. As of June 2026, Schwartz remained a board member of these two organizations, as well as Searching for Solutions Institute. Following her appointment as CDC director in August 2026, she resigned from the board of Aveanna Healthcare Holdings.

=== Director of the Centers for Disease Control and Prevention ===
On April 16, 2026, President Donald Trump named Schwartz as his nominee for director of the Centers for Disease Control and Prevention. In a July 2026 Senate nomination hearing, Schwartz stated that she supported the withdrawal of the United States from the World Health Organization.

On August 5, 2026, Schwartz was confirmed by the Senate as CDC Director in a 51–44 vote, becoming its first permanent leader in a year, and the first black woman to be CDC Director.
