= Public Health Service Smallpox Eradication Campaign Ribbon =

Decoration of the US Public Health Service

- Public Health Service Smallpox Eradication Campaign Ribbon
- Type: Campaign ribbon
- Awarded for: Service in the Smallpox Eradication Campaign
- Country: United States
- Presented by: the United States Public Health Service
- Eligibility: Members of the United States Public Health Service Commissioned Corps and members of any other uniformed service of the United States
- Status: Retired

Precedence
- Next (higher): Air Force Organizational Excellence Award
- Next (lower): Global Health Campaign Medal

The Public Health Service Smallpox Eradication Campaign Ribbon is a decoration of the United States Public Health Service presented to members of the United States Public Health Service Commissioned Officer Corps and to members of any other uniformed service of the United States

== Criteria ==
The PHS Smallpox Eradication Campaign Ribbon was awarded to officers who has served 9- days or more cumulative service in the Centers for Disease Control Bureau of Smallpox Eradication or Smallpox Laboratory, in the World Health Organization's (WHO) Smallpox Eradication Program, or in a temporary duty assignment in a smallpox effort abroad. The service must have occurred between January 1, 1966 and October 26, 1977.

== See also ==
- Awards and decorations of the Public Health Service
- Awards and decorations of the United States government
