= Public Health Service Hazardous Duty Award =

Decoration of the US Public Health Service

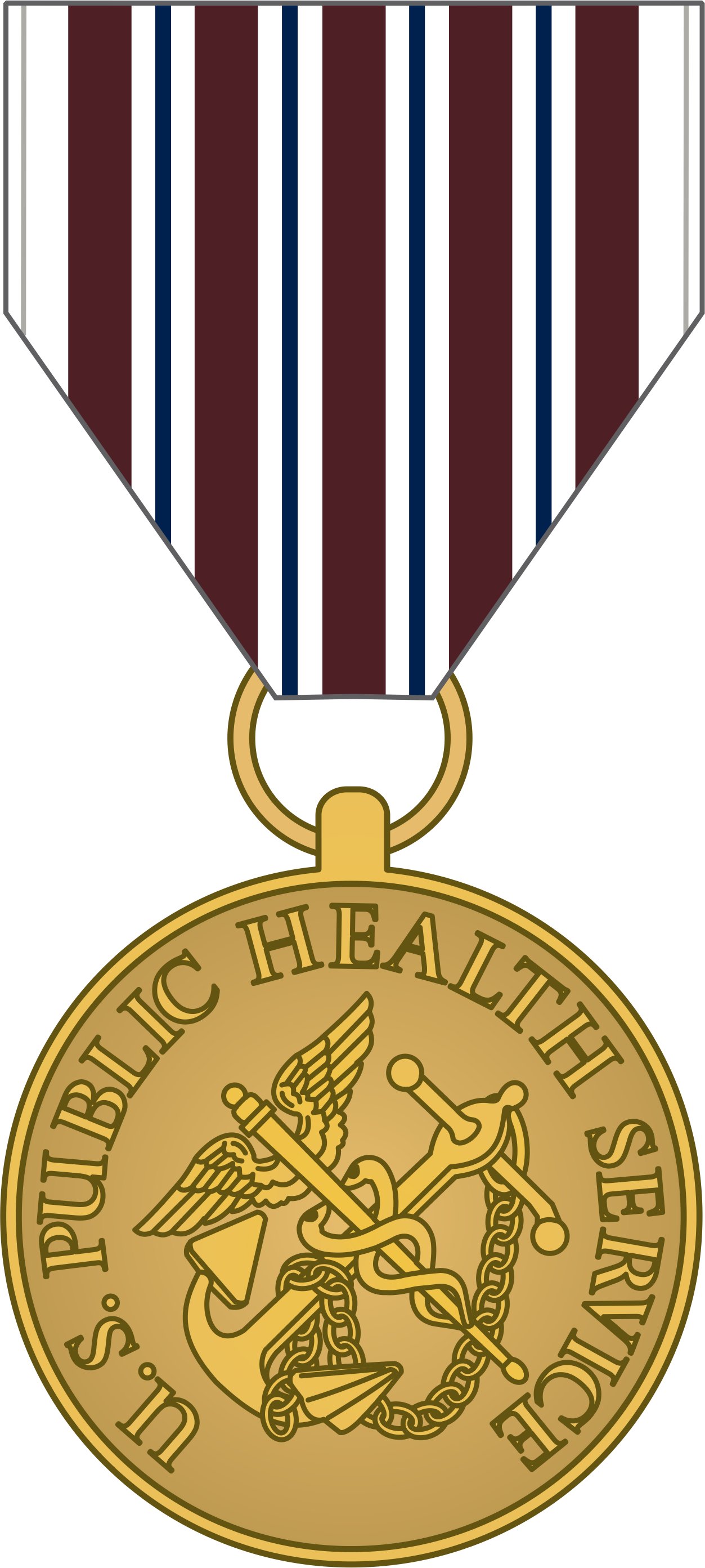
- Type: Service award
- Awarded for: Service in a position requiring frequent and significant risk to safety
- Country: United States
- Presented by: United States Public Health Service
- Eligibility: Members of the United States Public Health Service Commissioned Corps and members of any other uniformed service of the United States
- Ribbon

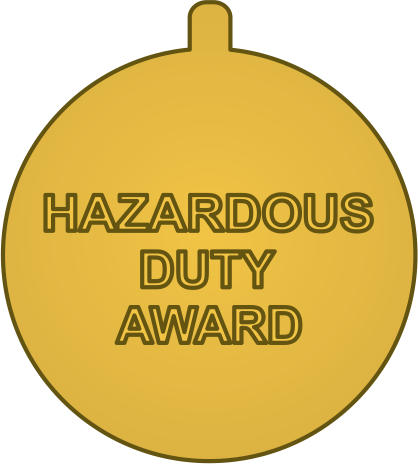
- Reverse

Precedence
- Next (higher): COVID-19 Pandemic Campaign Medal
- Next (lower): Foreign Duty Award

The Public Health Service Hazardous Duty Award is a decoration of the United States Public Health Service presented to members of the United States Public Health Service Commissioned Officer Corps and to members of any other uniformed service of the United States. It recognizes service in which the awardee faced significant risk while carrying out his or her duties.

== Criteria ==
The PHS Hazardous Duty Award is awarded to officers who served in positions requiring frequent and significant risk to their safety. An officer qualifies for the award only once for a particular type of duty.

An officer qualifies for the award by meeting any of the following criteria:

- Completion of 16 flights to duty-site destinations in a light aircraft, defined as an airplane or helicopter that seats 10 or fewer passengers, with each round trip counting as two duty-site destinations.
- Completion of 180 consecutive days of full-time contact or at least 1,000 non-full-time-duty contact hours with inmates or detainees of the United States Bureau of Prisons, the Forensic Hospital at St. Elizabeths Hospital, Immigration and Customs Enforcement, or the United States Marshals Service.
- Completion of at least 200 exposure hours while conducting industrial hygiene surveys of mine sites.
- Receipt of hazardous duty pay or imminent danger pay.
- Completion of diver training, maintenance of certification as a diver as required by the officer's agency, and receipt of dive pay for 180 consecutive days.
- On a case-by-case basis, other assignments which the Director, Public Health Service Commissioned Corps Headquarters, determines have exposed an officer to sufficient risk to his or her safety to merit the award, although an assignment associated with the treatment of Hansen's disease or one in which the officer's professional knowledge should reduce significantly or remove the risk a disease poses to his or her own health does not qualify an officer for the award.

== See also ==
- Awards and decorations of the Public Health Service
- Awards and decorations of the United States government
