= Public Health Service Global Health Campaign Medal =

Award of the U.S. Public Health Service

Public Health Service Global Health Campaign Medal Medal
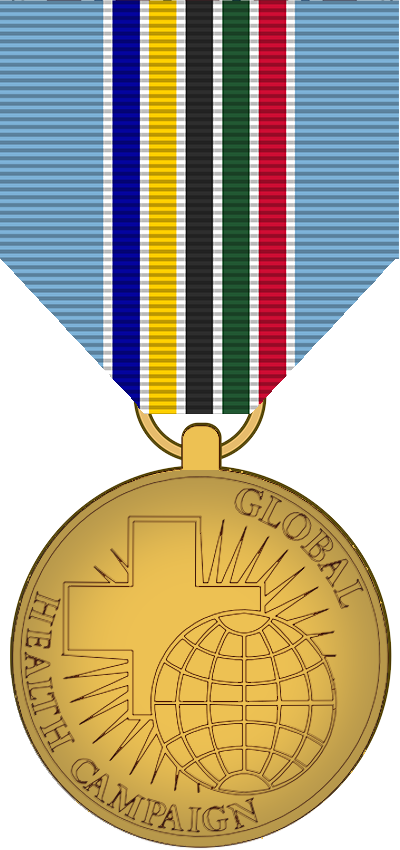
- Public Health Service Global Health Campaign Medal
- Type: Campaign medal (medal and ribbon)
- Awarded for: Support of a Global Health initiative mission, outside of the United States.
- Country: United States
- Presented by: the United States Public Health Service
- Eligibility: Members of the United States Public Health Service Commissioned Corps and members of any other Uniformed Service of the United States
- Ribbon

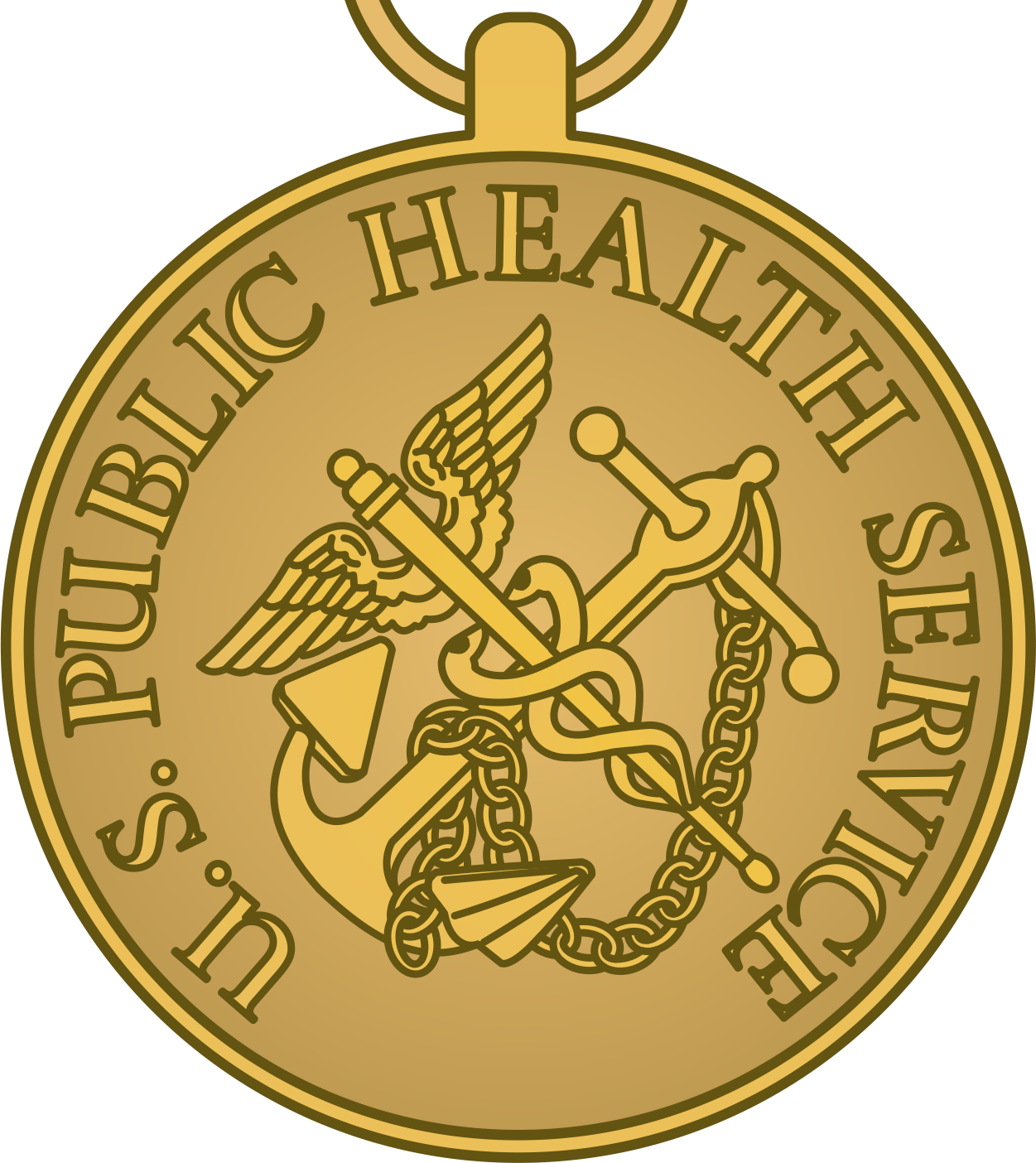
- Reverse
- Status: Active

Precedence
- Next (higher): Smallpox Eradication Campaign Ribbon
- Next (lower): Ebola Campaign Medal

The Public Health Service Global Health Campaign Medal is a decoration of the United States Public Health Service presented to members of the United States Public Health Service Commissioned Officer Corps and to members of any Uniformed Services of the United States in recognition of an officer's substantial contribution to a Global Health initiative mission outside of the United States.

== Criteria ==
The Public Health Service Global Health Campaign Medal is awarded to an officer who has been deployed to support a Global Health Initiative mission in a foreign duty assignment, either temporary or permanent. Foreign duty assignments do not include service in any US State or territory. Only one award will be awarded for participating in the same Global Health Initiative campaign, and officers are not eligible for the Public Health Service Foreign Duty Award or the Public Health Service Special Assignment Award for the same campaign. Qualifying Global Health initiatives and missions are determined by the Surgeon General of the United States.

== Devices ==
One award of the Public Health Service Global Health Campaign Medal is authorized for each qualifying Global Health Initiative. Subsequent awards are denoted by wearing a bronze service star on the suspension ribbon of the medal and on the service ribbon. A silver service star is worn in lieu of five bronze service stars.

An Expeditionary Attachment (EA) may be awarded to recognize service in a specific location or theater of operation in direct support of a Global Health Initiative mission under circumstances which, after full consideration, shall be deemed to merit special recognition. The Surgeon General shall determine which assignment quality for the EA. The EA is worn on the suspension ribbon of the medal and on the service ribbon. Only one EA is awarded for participation in the same campaign initiative or mission.

== See also ==
- Awards and decorations of the Public Health Service
- Awards and decorations of the United States government
