= Public Health Service Unit Commendation =

Decoration of the U.S. Public Health Service

- Type: Unit award
- Awarded for: Outstanding service, often at the U.S. state or regional level of significance
- Country: United States
- Presented by: United States Public Health Service
- Eligibility: Members of the United States Public Health Service Commissioned Corps

Precedence
- Next (higher): Outstanding Unit Citation
- Next (lower): Smallpox Eradication Campaign Ribbon

The Public Health Service Outstanding Unit Commendation is a decoration of the United States Public Health Service presented to members of the United States Public Health Service Commissioned Corps. It is the third-highest unit award of the USPHS Commissioned Corps.

== Criteria ==
The USPHS Commissioned Corps grants the Unit Commendation typically for specific actions over a relatively short and defined period of time, marked by discrete beginning and ending dates. Officers of a USPHS unit receive the Unit Commendation because of their collective contributions to the action or actions of the unit. Although all officers of the unit are eligible to receive the award, the appropriateness of inclusion of each officer is considered individually; however, a nomination for the citation does not need to cite the specific role of each officer.

The Unit Commendation is the third-highest unit award of the USPHS Commissioned Corps. The determinants of the appropriate level of recognition for a USPHS unit award are the importance and significance of the unit's action or actions in furthering the mission of the USPHS Commissioned Corps and the extent to which the achievement exceeds that which is normally expected of such officers. The USPHS Commissioned Corps grants the Unit Commendation to acknowledge significant contributions and achievements well above that normally expected in accomplishing the goals and objectives of a United States Department of Health and Human Services (HHS) operational or staff division or those of non-HHS organizations to which USPHS Commissioned Corps officers are detailed. To merit the Unit Commendation rather than the Public Health Service Outstanding Unit Citation, the unit's accomplishment must be at a lesser level than that required for the Outstanding Unit Citation, often at the U.S. state or regional level of significance.

The USPHS Commissioned Corps may recognize an officer who is a member of a unit that also includes civilians with the Unit Commendation. Civilian members of the unit are recognized through the USPHS's civilian awards system, but the civilian members are listed on the USPHS Commissioned Corps award nomination.

== See also ==
- Awards and decorations of the Public Health Service
- Awards and decorations of the United States government
