= Public Health Service Foreign Duty Award =

Decoration of the U.S. Public Health Service

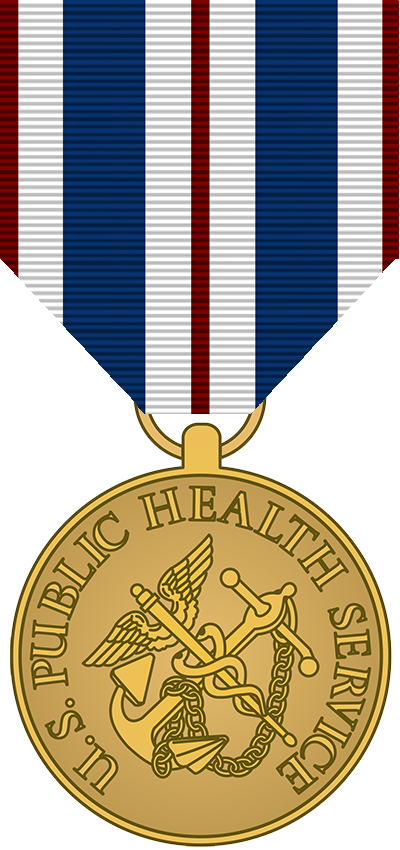
- Type: Service award
- Awarded for: Service outside the United States and its territories
- Country: United States
- Presented by: United States Public Health Service
- Eligibility: Members of the United States Public Health Service Commissioned Corps
- Ribbon

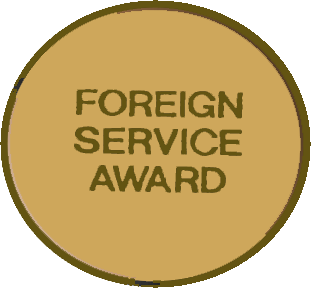
- Reverse

Precedence
- Next (higher): Hazardous Duty Award
- Next (lower): Special Assignment Award

The Public Health Service Foreign Duty Award is a decoration of the United States Public Health Service presented to members of the United States Public Health Service Commissioned Corps. It recognizes service outside the United States and its territories.

== Criteria ==
The PHS Foreign Duty Award is awarded to officers who serve on permanent or temporary assignment to a foreign duty station, excluding training assignments. For purposes of the award, a "foreign duty station" is defined as a duty station that lies outside the United States and its territories and specifically excludes duty stations in any U.S. state, the District of Columbia, Guam, the Commonwealth of Puerto Rico, the United States Virgin Islands, American Samoa, or any area formerly encompassed by the Trust Territory of the Pacific Islands, including the Northern Mariana Islands, the Republic of the Marshall Islands, the Federated States of Micronesia, and the Republic of Palau.

An officer qualifies for the award by meeting either of the following criteria:

- Completion of 30 or more consecutive days or 90 non-consecutive days on a foreign duty station ashore.
- Completion of 30 or more consecutive days on an assignment to a ship which operates in international waters and calls at foreign ports during the assignment period.

There are various restrictions on how days of service on a foreign duty station can be calculated to qualify an officer for multiple awards of the Foreign Duty Award:

- Duty for 30 or more consecutive days qualifies an officer for one award, but any consecutive days beyond 30 during the same assignment do not count toward a second award. An officer must return to the United States for at least 30 days before beginning a new foreign duty assignment of 30 or more consecutive days that would qualify him or her for a second award.
- When calculating the number of days spent on a foreign duty station, duty for 30 or more consecutive days may not be combined with other, non-consecutive days of service to calculate 90 days of service. The 30 or more consecutive days would qualify an officer for one award of the Foreign Duty Award, but qualification for a second award based on 90 non-consecutive days would have to be based on a set of 90 non-consecutive days that does not include any of the 30 (or more) consecutive days.
- Qualification for an award based on an assignment to a ship must be based on 30 or more consecutive days. Ninety days of non-consecutive shipboard service do not qualify an officer for the award.

== See also ==
- Awards and decorations of the Public Health Service
- Awards and decorations of the United States government
