= Public Health Service Special Assignment Award =

Decoration of the US Public Health Service

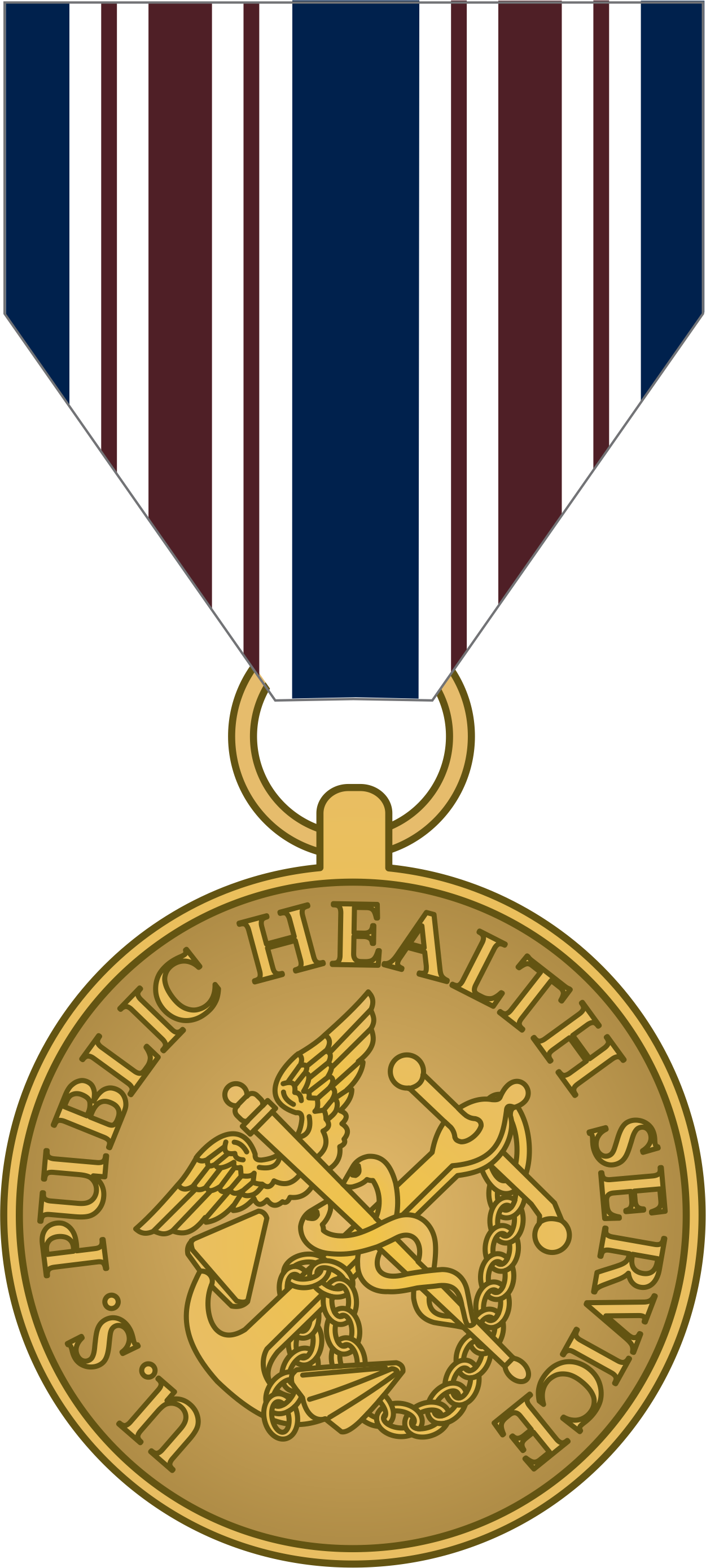
- Type: Service award
- Awarded for: Service in a special initiative of the U.S. Government, a U.S. state, or other organization
- Country: United States
- Presented by: United States Public Health Service
- Eligibility: Members of the United States Public Health Service Commissioned Corps
- Ribbon

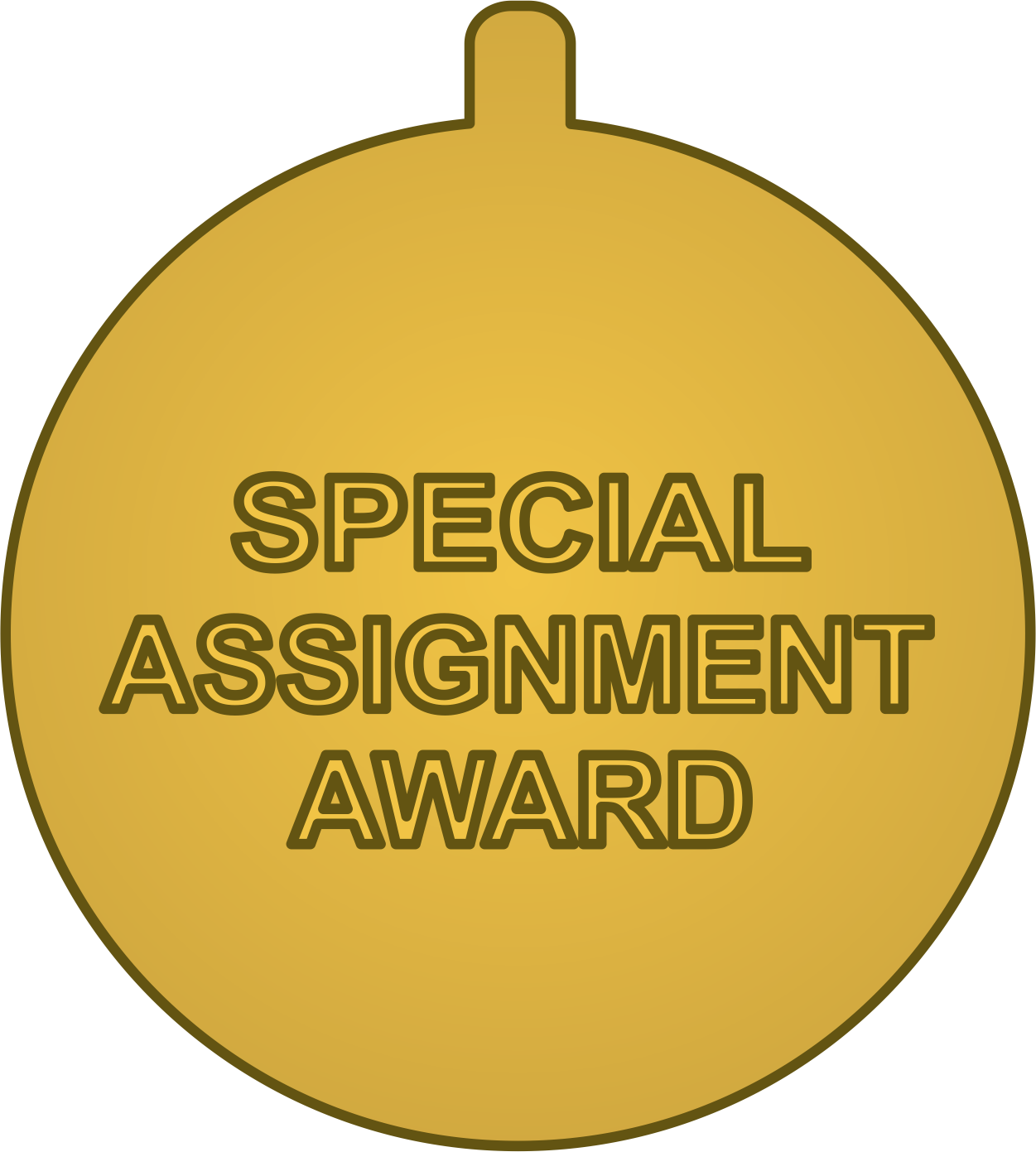
- Reverse

Precedence
- Next (higher): Foreign Duty Award
- Next (lower): Isolated/Hardship Award

The Public Health Service Special Assignment Award is a decoration of the United States Public Health Service presented to members of the United States Public Health Service Commissioned Corps. It recognizes service while assigned to special initiatives and activities that lie outside an officer's normal assigned duties.

== Criteria ==
The PHS Special Assignment Award is awarded to officers who are detailed via official personnel orders for a minimum of 30 days, either consecutive or non-consecutive, to a special program initiative of a United States Government agency, a government agency of a U.S. state, or other organizations. The Surgeon General of the United States validates special initiatives and activities, as well as required timeframes for participation, that qualify an officer for the award.

Generally, an assignment effected via an official mechanism such as a memorandum qualifies for the award. Assignments to special initiatives or activities of the United States Secretary of Health and Human Services, the Assistant Secretary for Health, or the Surgeon General, as well as assignments related to the role of the department's Chief Professional Officer, qualify. Assignments to organizations or entities the Surgeon General charters also qualify, although membership in a subcommittee or subgroup of those organizations or entities does not qualify.

For an officer to qualify for the award, the assignment cannot be a routine function of his or her position and cannot specifically be included in his or her position description. Assignments between components of the United States Department of Health and Human Services or to organizations with which the USPHS Commissioned Corps has a "blanket" detail agreement also do not qualify an officer for the award.

If an assignment consists of 30 or more non-consecutive days, the non-consecutive assignment must be in the same organizational entity, and must be a part of an ongoing activity with a clearly defined objective, to qualify for the award.

== See also ==
- Awards and decorations of the Public Health Service
- Awards and decorations of the United States government
