= Boris Lushniak =

Former acting United States Surgeon General (born 1961)

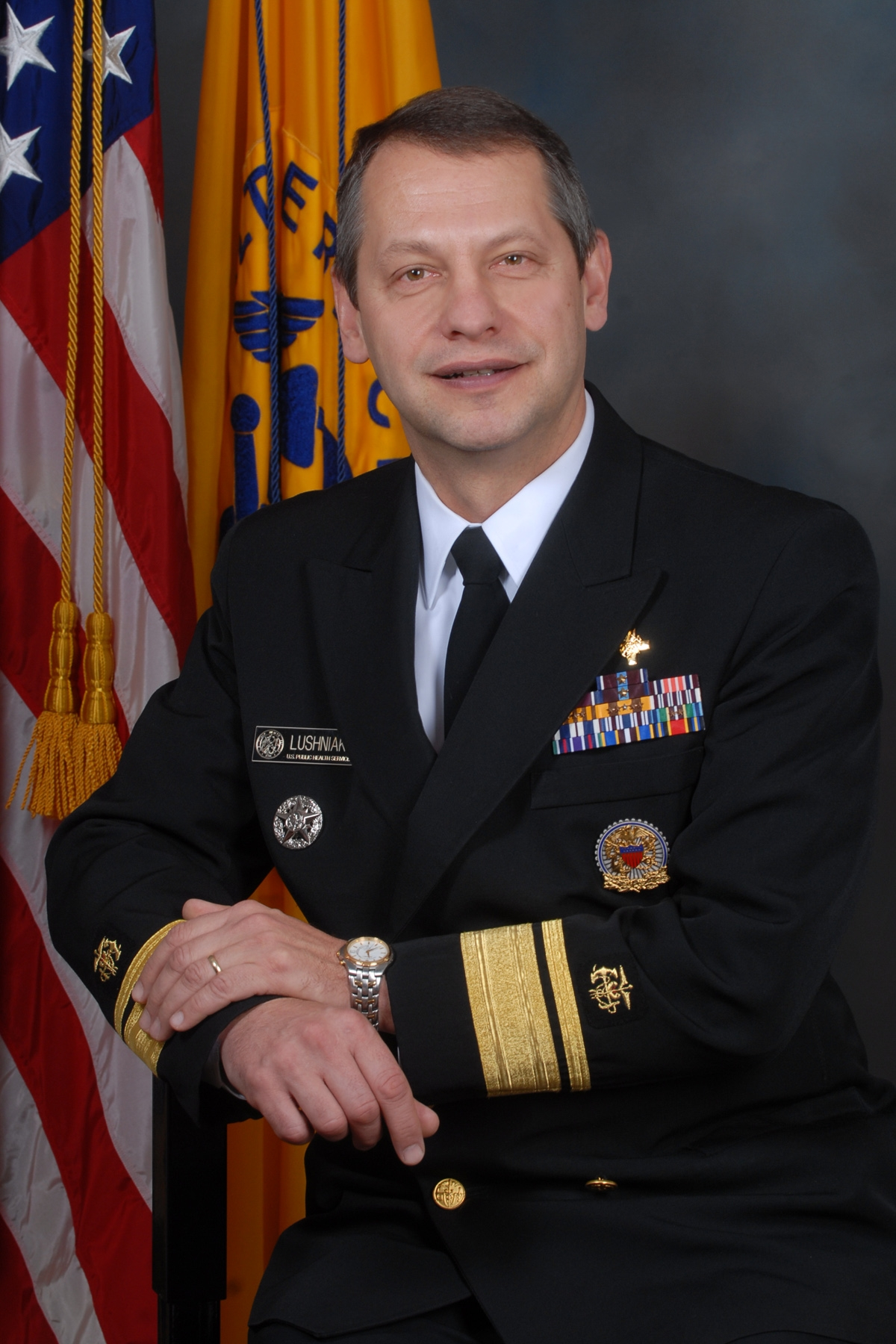

Surgeon General of the United States Acting
- In office July 17, 2013 – December 15, 2014
- President: Barack Obama
- Preceded by: Regina Benjamin
- Succeeded by: Vivek Murthy

Personal details
- Born: 1961 (age 64–65) Chicago, Illinois, U.S.
- Education: Northwestern University (MD); Harvard University

Military service
- Allegiance: United States
- Branch/service: U.S. Public Health Service
- Years of service: 1988–2015
- Rank: Rear Admiral
- Unit: USPHS Commissioned Corps

Boris Lushniak (born 1961) is a retired United States Public Health Service Commissioned Corps rear admiral who served as the acting Surgeon General of the United States, from July 17, 2013, to December 18, 2014. He previously served as the Deputy Surgeon General from 2010 to 2013 and from 2014 to 2015 when Vivek Murthy assumed office as Surgeon General. He retired from the Public Health Service on December 8, 2015, after over 27 years of service. On October 4, 2016, he was appointed dean of the University of Maryland, College Park School of Public Health, effective January 9, 2017.

== Early life and education ==
A native of Chicago, Illinois, Lushniak was born in 1961 to post-World War II immigrants from Ukraine. He attended St. Ignatius College Prep, graduating in 1977.

He attended Northwestern University, receiving a BS in Medicine in 1981, and an MD from Northwestern University Medical School in 1983. He then received an MPH from Harvard School of Public Health in 1984.

He completed a residency in family medicine in 1987 at St Joseph Hospital in Chicago and a residency in dermatology at the University of Cincinnati in 1993.

== Career ==
=== U.S. public health career ===
Starting out at the Centers for Disease Control and Prevention in the Epidemic Intelligence Service in 1988, Lushniak spent the next 16 years with the CDC, working on assignments in Russia, Kosovo and Bangladesh. as well as working at the World Trade Center site and with the CDC anthrax team.

Lushniak joined the Food and Drug Administration (FDA) in 2004 as the Chief Medical Officer of the Office of Counterterrorism, before being named FDA Assistant Commissioner for Counterterrorism Policy and Director of the Office of Counterterrorism within the Office of the Commissioner in 2005. In 2010 he was promoted to rear admiral (upper half) and named Deputy Surgeon General. Between July 2013 and December 2014 he served as Acting Surgeon General, until the appointment of Vivek Murthy as Surgeon General of the United States was approved December 15, 2014.

From January to March 2015 he served as commander of the USPHS Monrovia Medical Unit in Liberia, which was the only U.S. government hospital providing care to Ebola patients.

=== Post-government career ===
Retiring from the USPHS in September 2015, Lushniak joined the faculty of the Uniformed Services University of Health Sciences. He served as the chairman of the Preventive Medicine and Biostatistics department.

In January 2017 he became the dean of the University of Maryland School of Public Health.

== Awards and decorations ==
Lushniak is the recipient of the following awards and decorations:

Uniformed services awards and decorations

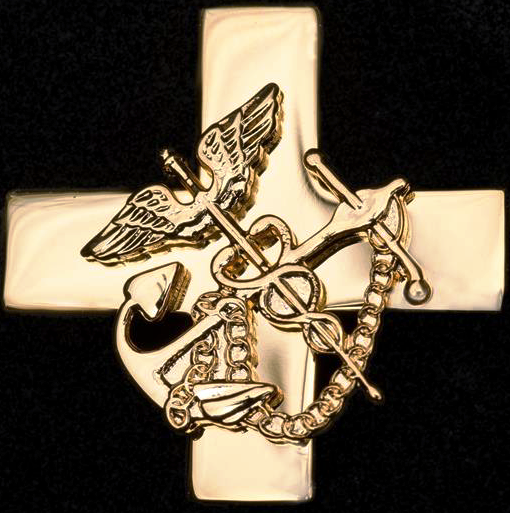

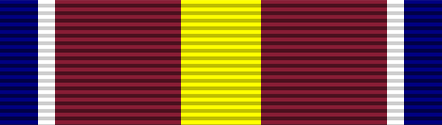

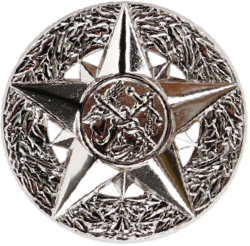

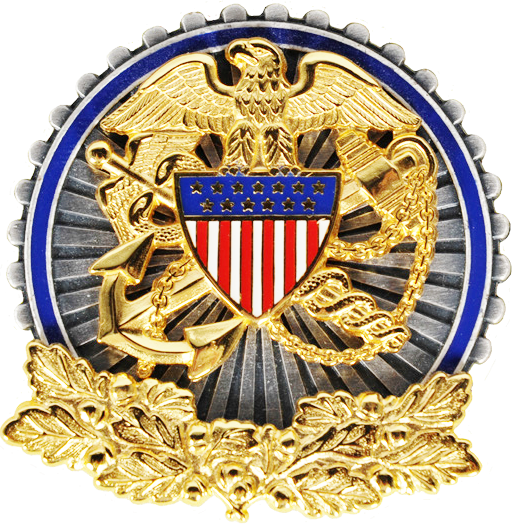

Badge	Field Medical Readiness Badge		
1st row	Public Health Service Distinguished Service Medal		Surgeon General's Medallion
2nd row	Surgeon General's Exemplary Service Medal	Public Health Service Outstanding Service Medal with 1 gold award star	Public Health Service Commendation Medal
3rd row	Public Health Service Achievement Medal with 1 award star	Public Health Service Citation Medal	Public Health Service Outstanding Unit Citation with 3 bronze service stars
4th row	Public Health Service Unit Commendation with 1 silver and 4 bronze service stars	Navy Meritorious Unit Commendation	Public Health Service Hazardous Duty Award
5th row	Public Health Service Foreign Duty Award	Public Health Service Special Assignment Award	Public Health Service Crisis Response Service Award with 2 service stars
6th row	Public Health Service Bicentennial Unit Commendation Award	Public Health Service Regular Corps Ribbon	Commissioned Corps Training Ribbon
Badges	Deputy (or acting) Surgeon General Badge		Department of Health and Human Services Identification Badge

== Personal life ==
Lushniak is married with two daughters, is active in the Ukrainian-American community and is member of Plast Ukrainian Scouting Organization, serving at youth camps for Ukrainian scouts in Wisconsin and New York.
