= Stephen C. Redd =

Assistant United States Surgeon General

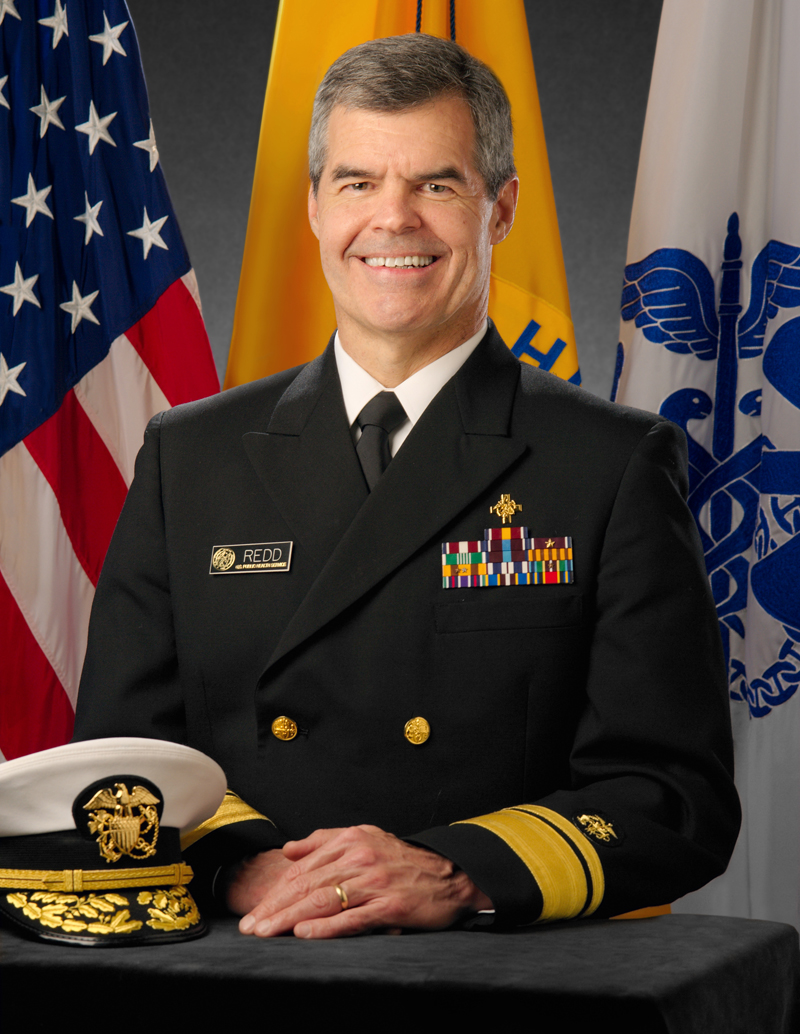
- Military career
- Allegiance: United States of America
- Branch: U.S. Public Health Service
- Rank: Rear admiral
- Unit: USPHS Commissioned Corps
- Awards: USPHS Distinguished Service Medal; USPHS Meritorious Service Medal; Outstanding Service Medal; USPHS Commendation Medal; USPHS Achievement Medal; USPHS Outstanding Unit Citation; USPHS Unit Commendation; USPHS Bicentennial Unit Commendation; USPHS Crisis Response Service Award; Field Medical Readiness Badge
- Website: www.CDC.gov

Stephen C. Redd is a retired U.S. physician and rear admiral with the U.S. Public Health Service and an Assistant Surgeon General. With over 30 years of public health and executive leadership experience, Redd served as the Director of the Office of Public Health Preparedness and Response at the Centers for Disease Control and Prevention. Previously, he was the Director of the CDC's Influenza Coordination Unit, where he served as the incident commander for the 2009-2010 H1N1 pandemic influenza response.

== Early life education ==
Redd grew up in Atlanta, Georgia, and played football and soccer in high school. He earned an undergraduate degree in history from Princeton University and graduated with honors from the Emory University School of Medicine. He is a member of Alpha Omega Alpha Medical Honor Society. Redd completed his residency in medicine at Johns Hopkins Hospital in Baltimore, Maryland.

== Career ==
Following residency training at the Johns Hopkins Hospital Redd joined CDC in 1985 as an Epidemic Intelligence Service Officer in the National Center for Infectious Diseases, where he investigated outbreaks of bacterial respiratory diseases, such as Legionnaires’ disease, conducted laboratory studies, and conducted nationwide surveys.

Following his EIS training, Redd joined the CDC’s International Health Program Office, where he worked on childhood survival projects in Africa to develop diagnostic and treatment strategies for malaria and acute respiratory infections.

Redd has investigated and led the U.S. response for some of the most notable public health outbreaks, including Legionnaires’ Disease in the 1980s and measles in the 1990s; he later served as an integral part of CDC’s Anthrax Response in 2001. Redd also led a team that evaluated the effect of air pollution regulations on deaths from carbon monoxide poisoning. In 2005, Redd was deployed on behalf of CDC to coordinate federal efforts and work closely with Louisiana health officials to recover from Hurricane Katrina.

=== Influenza Coordination Unit and H1N1 Pandemic Response ===
In 2006, in order to have a more comprehensive agency approach to its far-reaching influenza activities, the CDC created the Influenza Coordination Unit to prepare for and respond to severe influenza pandemics. From 2006 through 2014, Redd served as the director of the CDC’s Influenza Coordination Unit and was responsible for ensuring CDC’s readiness for an influenza pandemic. Redd worked across CDC, with state and local governments, and other federal agencies to develop and test response plans connecting international, federal, state and local efforts.

When the H1N1 pandemic influenza virus was first identified in April 2009, Redd was named Incident Commander where he led CDC’s H1N1 response, including case surveillance, public communication and education, developing and disseminating clinical guidance, and vaccination efforts. The CDC’s emergency response was active from April 2009 to March 2010. During the response, 81 million Americans were vaccinated, and over one million cases, 18,000 hospitalizations and 600 deaths were prevented through vaccination and antiviral treatment.

=== Office of Public Health Preparedness and Response ===
On January 1, 2015, Redd was asked to serve as the Director of the Office of Public Health Preparedness and Response. Redd continues to serve in that capacity and is charged with ensuring international, federal, state and local efforts to prepare for and respond to public health emergencies are effective, and that the United States is protected from a range of health threats CDC's readiness to respond to public health emergencies by overseeing the CDC's Division of State and Local Readiness, Division of Strategic National Stockpile, Division of Emergency Operations and Division of Select Agents and Toxins.

Under his leadership, CDC's Emergency Operations Center (EOC) has been activated for global and local health emergencies including the West Africa Ebola virus epidemic, Zika virus, the Flint Water Crisis, and Polio eradication efforts.

=== Publications ===
Redd has authored over 120 scientific publications on a variety of topics, including: pandemic influenza, Legionnaires' disease, acute respiratory infections, malaria, measles and asthma.

== Personal life ==
Redd is married and has two adult children. His wife, Judy is a radiologist in private practice in Atlanta. He and his family attend Christ the King Cathedral. Redd's son was a Boy Scout and achieved Eagle Scout rank, and Redd served as an Assistant Scout Master in an Atlanta Area Council Troop. Redd also volunteers with the Atlanta branch of the Commissioned Officers Association of the U.S. Public Health Service on a regular basis.

In the 2024 United States presidential election, Redd endorsed Kamala Harris.
