= Steven K. Galson =

American public health physician (born 1956)

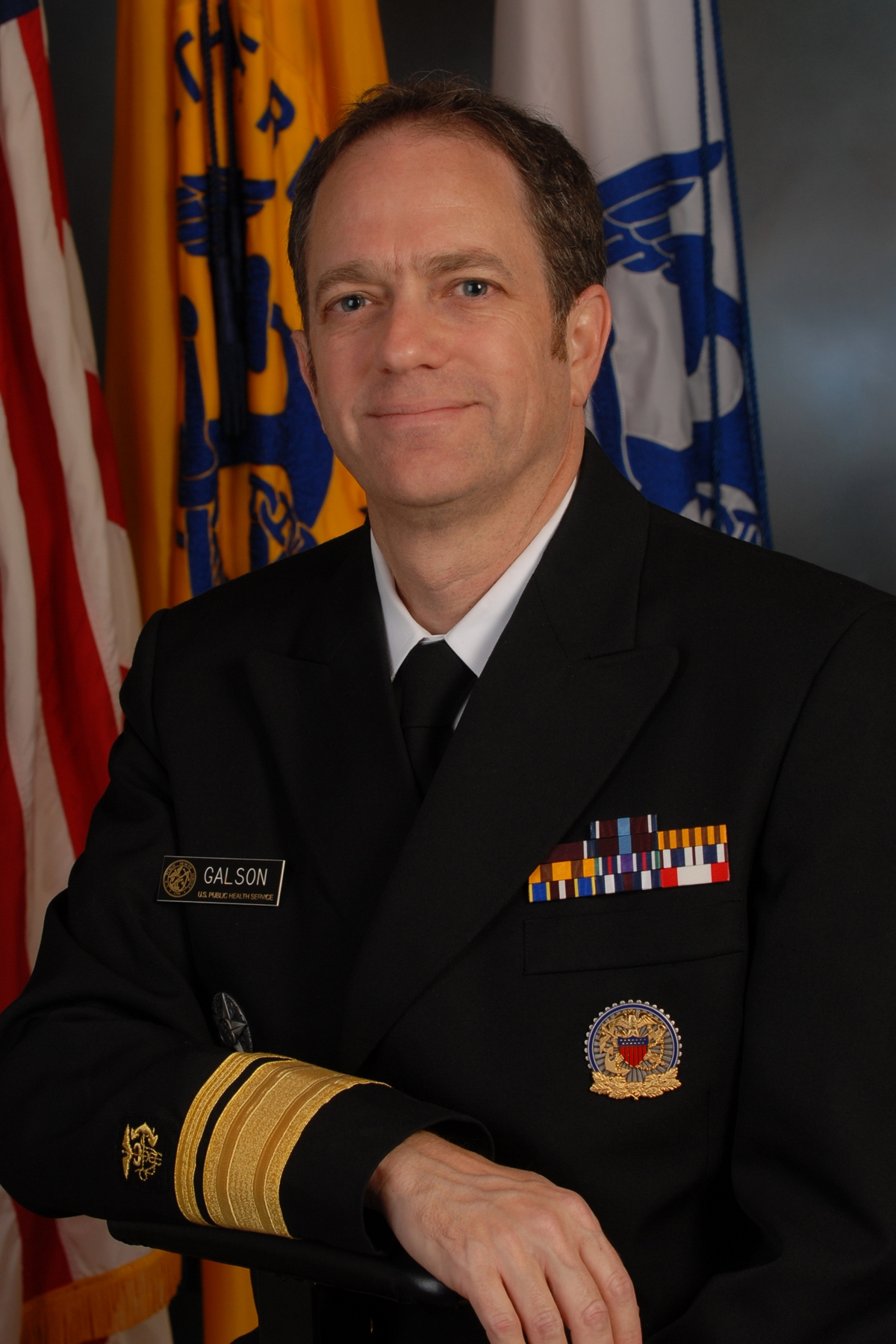
- Official portrait, 2007

Surgeon General of the United States Acting
- In office October 1, 2007 – October 1, 2009
- President: George W. Bush; Barack Obama
- Preceded by: Kenneth P. Moritsugu (acting)
- Succeeded by: Donald Weaver (acting)

U.S. Assistant Secretary for Health Acting
- In office January 22, 2009 – June 22, 2009
- President: Barack Obama
- Preceded by: Joxel Garcia
- Succeeded by: Howard K. Koh

Personal details
- Born: 1956 (age 69–70) Syracuse, New York, USA

Military service
- Service: U.S. Public Health Service
- Service years: 1986–2009
- Rank: Rear Admiral

Steven Kenneth Galson (born 1956) is an American public health physician. He is currently a Senior Advisor at the Boston Consulting Group and Independent Board Member at Biocryst Pharmaceuticals and Elephas Biosciences. Until 2021 he was Senior Vice President for Research and Development at Amgen, the California-based biopharmaceutical company. He is also a Trustee and Professor-at-Large at the Keck Graduate Institute for Applied Life Sciences in Claremont, California. He is a retired rear admiral in the United States Public Health Service Commissioned Corps and public health administrator who served as the acting Surgeon General of the United States from October 1, 2007 – October 1, 2009. He served concurrently as acting Assistant Secretary for Health from January 22 to June 25, 2009, and as the Deputy Director and Director of the Center for Drug Evaluation and Research (CDER) at the Food and Drug Administration from 2001 to 2007. As the Acting Surgeon General, he was the commander of the United States Public Health Service Commissioned Corps and, while serving as the Assistant Secretary for Health, was the operational head of the Public Health Service.

== Biography ==
=== Early years ===
Galson received his Baccalaureate Degree from Stony Brook University in 1978, an MD from the Mount Sinai School of Medicine in 1983, and an MPH from the Harvard School of Public Health in 1990. In 2008 he received an Honorary Doctorate in Public Service from Drexel University School of Public Health. He is board certified in General Preventive Medicine and Public Health as well as in Occupational Medicine.

=== Career ===
From 1 October 2007 until 1 October 2009, Galson served as the Acting Surgeon General of the United States. As the nation's top public health physician, the Surgeon General has two primary accountabilities: timely and effective communication of the best health information to the American people; and operational command of the Commissioned Corps of the United States Public Health Service, whose uniformed force of 6,500 health professional officers serve in over 600 duty locations around the world to promote, protect, and advance the health and safety of the people of the United States.

Between January and June, 2009 Galson was also the Acting Assistant Secretary for Health and led a Department-wide effort to prepare a plan for the $650 million Prevention and Wellness section of the American Recovery and Reinvestment Act of 2009 and managed 12 core public health programs for HHS.

Galson launched the Healthy Youth for a Healthy Future Initiative in 2008, which brought national attention to the complex issue of childhood obesity prevention, and prompted hundreds of community-based actions visiting 38 states, and personally modeling healthy behaviors directly with children. In 2008, RADM Galson established and assumed the role of Chair of the Department of Health and Human Services Childhood Overweight and Obesity Council to coordinate and leverage the impact of departmental programs. Since its establishment, the Council has launched over 30 departmental partnerships and joint activities. To further leverage collaboration, Galson created partnerships with national foundations, other federal departments including the US Department of Agriculture and the Department of Defense (DoD), the US Navy, faith-based groups, and corporate America.

Galson convened the Surgeon General's Workshop on pre-term birth in 2008, to jump-start national activities to reduce the incidence of these births. He published two Surgeon General's Calls to Action: on Deep Vein Thrombosis and Pulmonary Embolism, to bring renewed attention and prevention efforts to a health problem that kills more than 100,000 Americans every year; and on how to Promote Healthy Homes, to bring attention to the connection between housing and health and outline a blueprint for national action.

Upon announcement of the H1N1 influenza virus, he helped educate professionals and families on the status of the spread of the virus and how best to protect themselves through national public service announcements, satellite media interviews and briefing the foreign press in partnership with the State Department. And under his leadership, the Medical Reserve Corps continued its growth, reaching 786 units and 170,000 volunteers around the country. More than 1000 active duty officers were deployed to confront the devastation of the 2008 hurricanes in the Gulf.

Galson furthered the nation's evolution toward personalized medicine by releasing a new My Family Health Portrait a web-based tool to enable individuals and families to create, store and share their family health histories. He also highlighted the importance of preventing underage drinking, by visiting states to encourage local efforts on this persistent challenge. He created the Surgeon General's Perspectives, a column in the journal Public Health Reports, and published eight columns on various prevention topics, bringing a leadership viewpoint to this widely read publication. In addition, Galson started a regular column for dieticians in the Journal of the American Dietetics Association, and published six columns on topics of interest to this profession.

Prior to his appointment as Acting Surgeon General, he served as the Director of the Center for Drug Evaluation and Research (CDER) at the Food and Drug Administration (FDA). In this role, RADM Galson oversaw CDER's broad national and international programs in pharmaceutical regulation during a period of unprecedented scrutiny by Congress and outside groups. To that end, he initiated a landmark Institute of Medicine assessment of the US drug safety system and launched a broad action plan to address work culture challenges at CDER. He provided leadership for 2300 physicians, statisticians, chemists, pharmacologists other scientists, and administrators whose work promotes and protects public health by ensuring that safe and effective drugs are available to the American people.

Prior to his arrival at FDA, RADM Galson was the Director of the Office of Science Coordination and Policy, Office of Prevention, Pesticides and Toxic Substances, at the EPA. RADM Galson began his Public Health Service (PHS) career as an epidemiological investigator at the Centers for Disease Control after completing a residency in internal medicine at the Hospitals of the Medical College of Pennsylvania. During his public service career Galson was the Chief Medical Officer at both the Environmental Protection Agency and the US Department of Energy.

== Awards and decorations ==
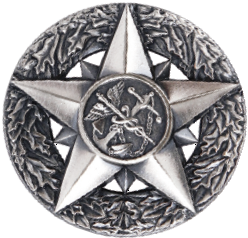

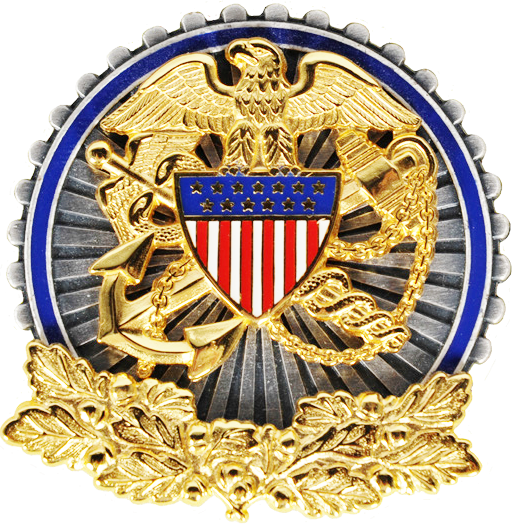

Badges	Officer-in-Charge Badge		Department of Health and Human Services Identification Badge
1st row	Public Health Service Outstanding Service Medal		
2nd row	Public Health Service Commendation Medal	Public Health Service Achievement Medal	Public Health Service Outstanding Unit Citation
3rd row	Public Health Service Unit Commendation	Public Health Service Bicentennial Unit Commendation Award	Public Health Service Foreign Duty Award
4th row	Public Health Service Regular Corps Ribbon	Commissioned Officers Association Ribbon	Association of Military Surgeons of the United States Ribbon

Galson is the recipient of numerous PHS awards, including Surgeon General's Medallion, the Robert Brutsche Award from the Commissioned Officers Association of the U.S. Public Health Service and the Founders Award from the Association of Military Surgeons of the United States. He is also the recipient of three James R. Schlesinger Awards. Galson is a member of the National Academy of Medicine Forum on Drug Discovery, Development, and Translation after serving two terms as co-chair and completed a term as member of the National Board of Medical Examiners in 2007. In 2009 Galson received a Distinguished Alumnus Award from Stony Brook University. In 2015, Galson received the Jacobi Medallion from the Mount Sinai School of Medicine. In 2018, Galson received the Health Leader of the Year award from the Commissioned Officer Association of the U.S. Public Health Service,
