= Susan Blumenthal =

American public health expert (born 1952)

Deputy Assistant Secretary of Health and Human Services for Women's Health; Director of the Office on Women's Health
- In office 1993–1997
- President: Bill Clinton
- Preceded by: Position established
- Succeeded by: Wanda Jones

Personal details
- Born: Susan Jane Blumenthal; June 29, 1952 (age 74)
- Spouse: Ed Markey (m. 1988)
- Education: Reed College (BA); Harvard University (MPA); University of Tennessee (MD); Stanford University School of Medicine (Residency)
- Uniformed service
- Allegiance: United States
- Branch: U.S. Public Health Service Commissioned Corps
- Service years: 1984–2004
- Rank: Rear Admiral
- Awards: Distinguished Service Medal; Meritorious Service Medal; Outstanding Service Medal; Surgeon General's Exemplary Service Medal; Achievement Medal; Commendation Medal

Susan Jane Blumenthal (born June 29, 1952) is an American physician, global health expert, psychiatrist and public health advocate. With more than two decades of service as a senior government health leader in the administrations of four U.S. presidents, Blumenthal served as the first Deputy Assistant Secretary for Women's Health and director of the Office on Women's Health within the U.S. Department of Health and Human Services (HHS), as well as Assistant Surgeon General of the United States and senior global health advisor within the HHS. She also was a research branch chief at the National Institutes of Health (NIH), and the chair of the NIH Health and Behavior Coordinating Committee. Blumenthal served as the Public Health Editor of the Huffington Post and as a health columnist for magazines including US News and World Report and Elle.

Currently, Blumenthal is a Visiting Professor at the MIT Media Lab, a Distinguished Provost Professor at Northeastern University, the senior medical and policy advisor at amfAR, The Foundation for AIDS Research, a senior fellow in health policy at New America, and a clinical professor at Tufts and Georgetown University Schools of Medicine. She is also the Ambassador for the Institut Curie, France's leading cancer hospital and research center that carries forward Madame Marie Curie's legacy in the 21st century. Rear Admiral Blumenthal has received numerous awards, honorary doctorates, and medals for her significant contributions to improving health including the Distinguished Service Medal of the U.S. Public Health Service and being appointed a Knight (Chevalier) in the French Legion of Honor, France's highest recognition for military and civilian achievement. She is married to United States Senator Ed Markey.

== Education ==
Blumenthal is of Jewish heritage. Her mother was afflicted by cancer while Blumenthal was a child, strongly influencing her decision to become a medical professional. Blumenthal received her undergraduate degree from Reed College and a Master of Public Administration (MPA) from Harvard's Kennedy School of Government. She attended medical school at the University of Tennessee College of Medicine, completing clinical clerkships and her residency at Stanford University School of Medicine and a fellowship at the National Institute of Mental Health.

== Career ==
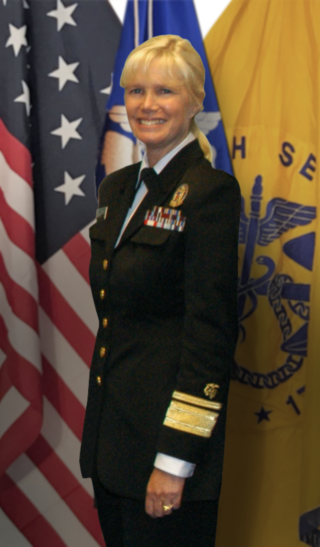
Blumenthal in 2004

For more than two decades, Blumenthal served as a national leader and senior government health official, researcher, and policymaker in the administrations of four U.S. presidents. She served as Assistant Surgeon General of the United States, as well as rear admiral and senior science/e-health advisor in the United States Department of Health and Human Services (HHS). From 1993 to 1997, Blumenthal served as the first deputy assistant secretary for women's health and director of the Office on Women's Health. In this position, she oversaw a $4 billion budget of women's health research, services and education programs across HHS agencies including NIH, CDC and FDA and worked with other government departments and private sector organizations to improve women's health. Blumenthal established new initiatives to advance women's health and the study of sex differences, including the National Centers of Excellence in Women's Health Program at major academic health centers across the country, the National Women's Health Information Center, a resource hub available on the internet and through a toll free telephone number, and appointed regional women's health coordinators. During this time, she served as a White House health advisor. During her tenure, funding and attention to women's health significantly increased and women's health care became a national priority.

Blumenthal organized and chaired the "Healthy Women 2000" Capitol Hill Conference Series and hosted an award-winning 13-part television series on women's health issues. She also participated as a member of the President's Interagency Council on Women, and was the United States representative to the World Health Organization's Global Commission on Women's Health and to the US/Mexico Bi-national Commission on Women's Health. She served as co-chair of the US-Canada Conference on Women's Health and chair of the Federal Women's Health and the Environment Coordinating Committee. A critical focus of Blumenthal's work has been defeating breast cancer. She co-chaired a Presidential initiative and established many innovative, cross-cutting Federal agency programs, including the “Missiles to Mammograms” initiative, partnering with the CIA, NASA, and United States Department of Defense to focus missile, space and intelligence imaging technology on the improvement of early detection of breast and other cancers. This work served as a foundation for the development of computer assisted diagnosis, 3D imaging of tumors and other advancements in the field.

Blumenthal also served as U.S. Assistant Surgeon General. Her work focused on advancing global health, addressing health disparities, improving mental health, preventing violence and suicide, and emphasizing the importance of disease prevention. Throughout her career, Blumenthal has worked to end the HIV/AIDS epidemic since it first emerged in 1981 and is currently senior medical advisor at amfAR, the Foundation for AIDS Research. She was among the first in the government to address this disease's impact on women. She has chaired major conferences, established research initiatives, and written articles to increase awareness of HIV/AIDS in America and worldwide. Additionally, Blumenthal has been involved in the national response to bioterrorism and in advancing health care reform efforts.

Blumenthal was a pioneer in applying information technology to improve health, establishing some of the first health internet sites in the government. Health education and mentoring of students has also been a focus of her work. She is the founder of a new field of public health technology to advance education, training, research, and entrepreneurship with professionals who are "bilingual" in technology and public health and to establish innovative multidisciplinary collaborative programs. She serves as the Senior Health Advisor to the President of Arizona State University, co-chairing an initiative that has established the first School of Technology for Public Health in the world. She also serves as a Provost Distinguished Professor at Northeastern University where she provides leadership establishing multidisciplinary initiatives and convening conferences in this new field. She has served as the Elizabeth Blackwell Lecturer and Bundy Visiting professor at the Mayo Clinic, the Lila Wallis Distinguished Professor of Women's Health at Weill Cornell Medical College, as a visiting professor at Stanford University in Washington, as distinguished visiting professor of women's studies at Brandeis University, and as a visiting fellow at the Harvard University School of Government.

Prior to these positions, Blumenthal was head of the Suicide Research Unit and coordinator of Project Depression, the first major public awareness campaign on this disease at the National Institute of Mental Health (NIMH). She served as a national spokesperson, increased scientific and public attention, and stimulated research and prevention efforts to address these public health problems. She also was a senior advisor to the White House Council on Youth Violence and established and served as the director of the National Youth Violence Prevention Resource Center at HHS and launched its website, safeyouth.org. Blumenthal edited a book, Suicide over the Life Cycle and was the editor of the Surgeon General's Call to Action to Prevent Suicide. In 1984, she was commissioned as a medical officer in the United States Public Health Service, rising to the rank of two-star admiral. In 1985, Blumenthal was appointed as the chief of the Basic Prevention and Behavioral Medicine Research Branch at NIMH. During her tenure at NIH, she worked with other colleagues and advocates to expose the inequities in women's health research and the lack of focus on sex differences in disease.

Blumenthal was the founding director of the Health and Medicine Program at the Center for the Study of the Presidency and Congress. She served as chair of the Global Health Program at the Meridian International Center. Blumenthal was co-chair of the Commission on U.S. Federal Leadership in Health and Medicine: Charting Future Directions and also directed an initiative to promote peace through health in the Middle East. She was a member of the Global Business Network.

=== Later career ===
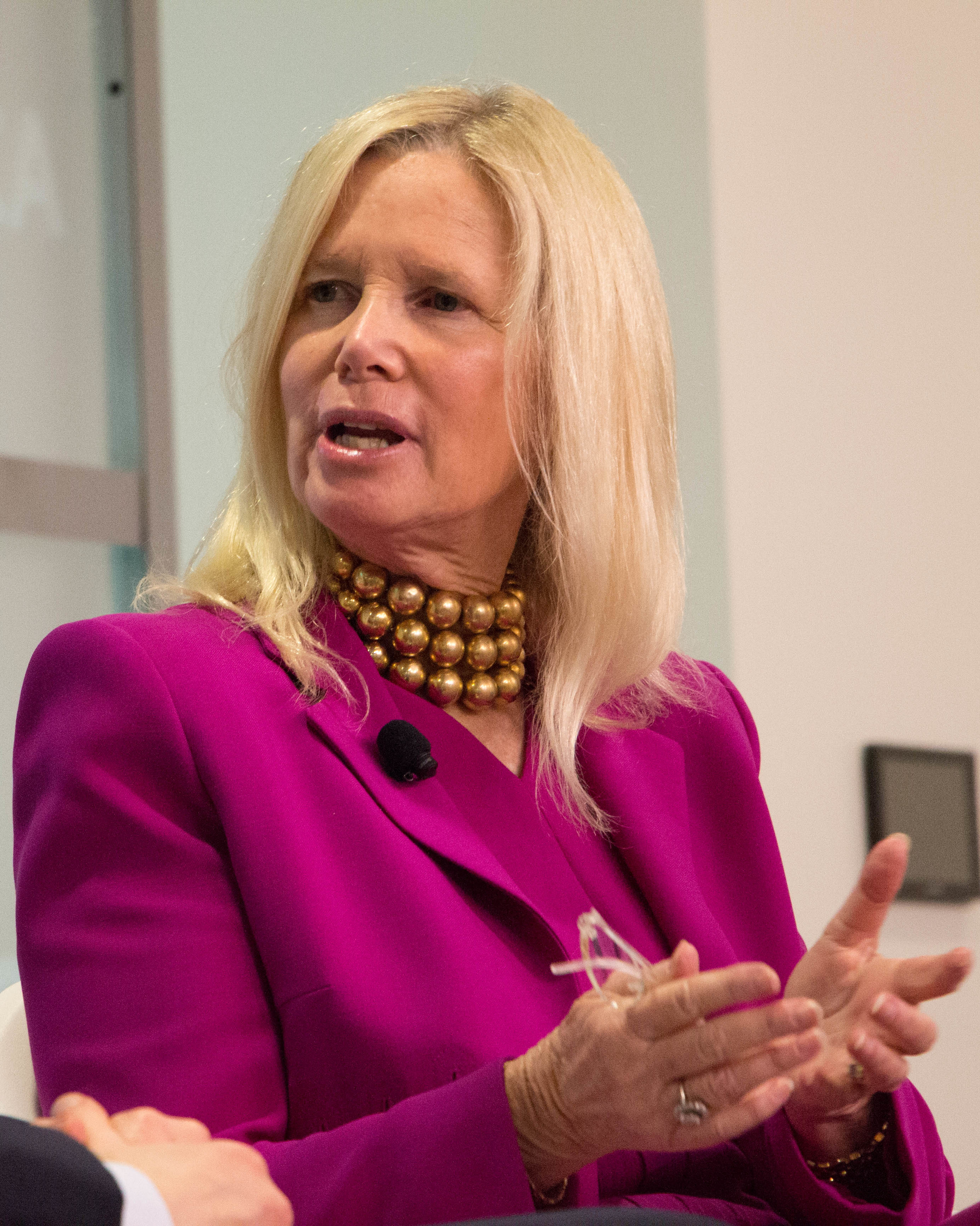
Blumenthal in 2016

Currently, Blumenthal is a visiting professor at the MIT Media Lab, a Provost Distinguished Professor at Northeastern University, the senior policy and medical advisor at amfAR, The Foundation for AIDS Research, and a clinical professor at Tufts Medical Center and the Georgetown University School of Medicine. She is also a senior fellow in health policy at New America, where she directs the SNAP to Health initiative that promotes nutrition and obesity prevention in Federal Food Assistance Programs and explores ways to apply information technology to advance health. She established the Wiring WIC initiative collaborating with the MIT Media Lab that issued recommendations to modernize the Women, Infants and Children Supplemental Nutrition Program (WIC) in which 50% of children born in America are enrolled. Additionally, Blumenthal serves on the board of directors of several philanthropic and educational organizations and is a member of the Director's Circle of the MIT Media Lab. At the MIT Media Lab, she also serves as the Honorary Chair of the WHx Initiative, developing technologies to transform women's' health in the 21st century.
As Ambassador for the Institut Curie, France's leading cancer research institute and hospital, Blumenthal leads U.S. efforts to support the creation of the world's first Chemical Biology of Cancer Research center in Paris, focused on stopping metastasis, the cause of 90% of cancer deaths.

== Awards ==
Blumenthal has received numerous honorary doctorates and medals, and has been named a top doctor by The New York Times, Ladies' Home Journal, and The Medical Herald. In 2006, Blumenthal was decorated with the Distinguished Service Medal of the United States Public Health Service, its highest honor “for distinguished and pioneering leadership, groundbreaking contributions, and dedicated public service that has improved the health of women, our Nation, and the world”. She has been awarded other medals for her contributions to advancing health, including the Meritorious Service Medal, the Outstanding Service Medal, the Surgeon General's Exemplary Service Medal, and the Commendation Medal. In 2009, she received the Health Leader of the Year Award from the Commissioned Officers Association of the U.S. Public Health Service, its highest honor. Additionally, Blumenthal was the recipient of the Abram Sachar Silver Medallion from Brandeis University, in recognition of her pioneering leadership in women's health. She is the recipient of the Dr. Rosalind Franklin Centennial Life in Discovery Award and the Women's Leadership Award from Save the Children. She was honored as a Woman of Distinction by the Association of American University Women, and named a “Rock Star of Science” by the Geoffrey Beene Foundation. Blumenthal has served as the commencement speaker and received honorary degrees and doctorates from universities in the United States and around the world in recognition of her contributions to improving national and global health, and for “her innovative work in identifying and championing understudied public health problems, and marshaling the resources of the government to address them." In 2025, Blumenthal was appointed as a knight (chevalier) in the French Legion of Honor, France's highest award for military and civilian achievement, in recognition of her "transformative leadership in global and women’s health and her decade-long commitment to fostering transatlantic collaboration in cancer research and care as Ambassador for the Institut Curie." She was awarded the Marie Curie Legacy Medal by the Institut Curie in recognition of her "extraordinary advocacy and scientific leadership in the fight against cancer and on behalf of the Institut." Dr. Blumenthal is recognized for her influential leadership in addressing disparities among women's health as well as advancing research on sex differences in disease.
