= Steven Libutti =

American surgeon and scientist

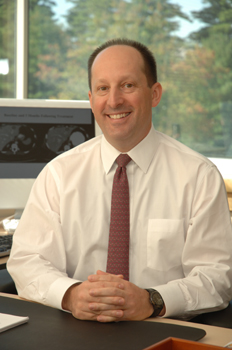
- Born: April 18, 1964 (age 62); Long Beach, New York, U.S.
- Occupations: Surgical Oncologist, Endocrine Surgeon, Cancer Center Director
- Uniformed Service
- Allegiance: United States
- Branch: U.S. Public Health Service Commissioned Corps
- Service years: 1995–2010
- Rank: CAPTAIN

Steven Kenneth Libutti, M.D., F.A.C.S. (born April 18, 1964) is an American surgeon and scientist. In January 2017, he became the third permanent Director of the Rutgers Cancer Institute of New Jersey, Vice Chancellor for Cancer Programs for Rutgers Health and the Senior Vice President for Oncology Services for RWJBarnabas Health, the largest health system in New Jersey. On October 17, 2024, Libutti was appointed the inaugural William N. Hait Director of the Rutgers Cancer Institute by the Rutgers University Board of Governors. He is a tenured Distinguished Professor of Surgery at the Rutgers Robert Wood Johnson Medical School. Libutti's work on the study of tumor angiogenesis and the tumor microenvironment has led to novel approaches for the treatment of cancer. He is also one of the pioneers of regional and targeted cancer therapy.

Libutti was the founding Director of the Montefiore-Einstein Center for Cancer Care, and served as the Associate Director of the Albert Einstein Cancer Center and Vice-Chairman of the Department of Surgery at Montefiore Medical Center and the Albert Einstein College of Medicine from 2009 to 2017. Libutti was a tenured Professor of Surgery and Genetics at the Albert Einstein College of Medicine in the Bronx, New York and a Professor of Surgery at the Uniformed Services University of the Health Sciences in Bethesda, Maryland. In September 2009, Libutti was invested as The Marvin L. Gliedman, M.D. Distinguished Surgeon in the Department of Surgery at Montefiore Medical Center. Libutti is the Editor-in-Chief Emeritus of the Springer Nature journal, Cancer Gene Therapy.

== Early life and education ==
Libutti grew up in Long Beach, New York and is the eldest child of Dennis and Phyllis Libutti. Libutti had a dream of becoming a doctor ever since he watched M*A*S*H and Marcus Welby, M.D. during his childhood. Since he was growing up in New York at the time, Libutti wanted to become an orthopedic surgeon, a doctor that in his dreams will be a person who would tend either to the New York Giants or the New York Yankees.

Libutti attended Long Beach High School and graduated in 1982. He then attended Harvard College and received his B.A. degree from Harvard University in 1986 with magna cum laude honors. Following college he attended the Columbia University College of Physicians and Surgeons where he graduated Alpha Omega Alpha and received his M.D. degree in 1990. Libutti completed his surgical residency at the Presbyterian Hospital in New York in 1995 and was selected to serve as the Chief Resident from 1994 to 1995. Following residency, he moved to the National Cancer Institute in Bethesda, Maryland and in 1996, he completed a fellowship in surgical oncology and endocrine surgery in the Surgery Branch of the National Cancer Institute.

== Career ==
Libutti joined the staff of the Surgery Branch in 1996 and became a tenured senior investigator and the section chief of the Tumor Angiogenesis Section in 2006. In 2007, Libutti was promoted to Professor of Surgery at the Uniformed Services University of the Health Sciences in Bethesda, Maryland. In 2009 Libutti was named the Founding Director of the Montefiore-Einstein Center for Cancer Care, Associate Director of the Albert Einstein Cancer Center and Vice-Chairman of the Department of Surgery at Montefiore Medical Center and the Albert Einstein College of Medicine. He was a tenured professor of surgery and genetics at the Albert Einstein College of Medicine in the Bronx, New York and a Professor of Surgery at the Uniformed Services University of the Health Sciences in Bethesda, Maryland. Libutti was also The Marvin L. Gliedman, M.D. Distinguished Surgeon, an endowed position in the Department of Surgery at Montefiore Medical Center. In 2017, Libutti joined Rutgers University as a tenured Professor of Surgery at the Robert Wood Johnson Medical School (promoted to Distinguished Professor in 2023) and an Affiliated Distinguished Professor in Genetics at the School of Arts and Sciences. Libutti is a fellow of the American College of Surgeons, the Society of Surgical Oncology, the Society of University Surgeons, and the American Surgical Association. He is a member of the American Association for Cancer Research, the American Society of Clinical Oncology, the American Joint Committee on Cancer and is a Past President of the American Association of Endocrine Surgeons.

== Research ==
Libutti is studying tumor neovascular formation and the interaction between tumor cells, endothelial cells and the components of the tumor microenvironment. The goal of Libutti's research program is to develop novel cancer therapies through a better understanding of the tumor microenvironment. The interaction of a tumor and its vasculature is critical for both tumor growth and the spread of tumor cells to distant organs. The process of new vessel development within the tumor is termed angiogenesis and is required for tumors to grow larger than a few millimeters. In order to better understand the relationship between the tumor and its blood supply, their research is focused on the interaction between tumor-derived factors and endothelial cells developing in the context of the tumor microenvironment. By understanding this interaction, they hope to be able to design novel treatment strategies to inhibit both the growth and the spread of tumors. They are currently studying a variety of tumor-derived factors with effects on tumor-associated vasculature. These include vascular endothelial growth factor (VEGF) and endothelial cell monocyte-activating polypeptide II (EMAP-II). EMAP-II is a cytokine with potent effects on blood vessels and was discovered by a research team (including Libutti) at Columbia University. Cytokines such as VEGF and EMAP-II appear to be produced in varying amounts by tumors and have direct effects on the tumor neovasculature. Libutti's approach to the study of these interactions has been through the utilization of a variety of in vitro and in vivo model systems.

His team is using gene expression profiling to understand the changes that occur in endothelial cells exposed to tumor-derived factors. His laboratory is developing techniques, which allow them to isolate endothelial cells from tumor tissue. This has resulted in their ability to study tumor-derived endothelial cells directly, and has led to the observation that tumor associated endothelial cells have epigenetic changes compared to normal endothelial cells from the same tissue type. This approach has also allowed them to identify specific genes such as FILIP1L (formerly DOC1), which appear to play a role in the control of endothelial cell responses to angiogenesis inhibitors. They are also using noninvasive imaging techniques, including dynamic MRI and PET, to map changes in tumor blood flow within tumors both in animal models and in patients on clinical trials. A variety of inhibitors of tumor angiogenesis are being actively studied. These include both recombinant proteins derived from naturally occurring substances as well as small molecules designed to act on specific pathways. Various methods of delivering these agents, including gene therapy approaches and the use of tumor targeted nanoparticles are being pursued. Libutti was the first to administer TNF bound colloidal gold nanoparticles as targeted therapy to cancer patients.

The overall goal of Libutti's work is to translate a better understanding of tumor cell-endothelial cell interactions, within the context of the tumor microenvironment, into better therapies for patients with cancer. Dr. Libutti is also studying the role of tumor suppressor genes such as MEN1 in the process of tumor formation. Specifically, deciphering the role of MEN1 in the tissue selective development of tumors is work for which Libutti received an R01 grant from the NCI. Libutti has published over 290 peer reviewed journal articles and currently has a Hirsch Index of 67. He is the Editor-in-Chief of Cancer Gene Therapy, a Springer Nature journal focused on cancer gene and cellular therapies.

In addition to his laboratory and research interests, Libutti is a clinical surgeon, with experience in management of malignancies of the liver, pancreas, and gastrointestinal tract, and in the application of laparoscopic surgery. In addition, Libutti provides endocrinological surgical consultation and treatment for patients with disorders of the thyroid, parathyroid, adrenal glands, and for endocrine tumors arising in the pancreas.

== Uniformed service ==
In June 1995, Libutti was commissioned a Lieutenant (O-3) in the Reserve Corps of the United States Public Health Service Commissioned Corps and called to extended active duty. Libutti was assigned as a Clinical Associate in the Surgery Branch of the National Cancer Institute, National Institutes of Health. In January 1996, he was promoted to Lieutenant Commander and in July 1996, became a Clinical Investigator. He served in this capacity until July 1999, when he was promoted to Commander and Senior Clinical Investigator. In January 2000, Libutti completed his tour of active duty and inactivated, retaining his commission in the Inactive Reserve Corps. In September 2005, Libutti was recalled to active duty and deployed to Baton Rouge, Louisiana in support of hurricane relief efforts for hurricane Katrina. He was assigned as the Incident Commander for the LSU Field House SNS (formerly the PMAC field hospital). At the completion of this short tour, he once again inactivated. He was recalled again to a short tour of active duty in August 2006, and was promoted to Captain (O-6). Libutti was recalled to an intermittent tour of active duty from January 2007 through March 2010 in support of an Army backfill request and detailed to the Department of Defense, U.S. Army Medical Command (MEDCOM), in the Department of Surgery of the Walter Reed Army Medical Center, Washington, DC, in support of Operation Iraqi Freedom and Operation Enduring Freedom. In July 2007, Libutti was elected to the Board of Directors of the Commissioned Officers Association of the U.S. Public Health Service and named a Trustee of the Commissioned Officers Foundation of the U.S. Public Health Service. Libutti is also a member of the Reserve Officers Association, the Association of Military Surgeons of the United States and the Military Officers Association of America. CAPT Libutti completed his uniformed service and honorably separated in March 2010.

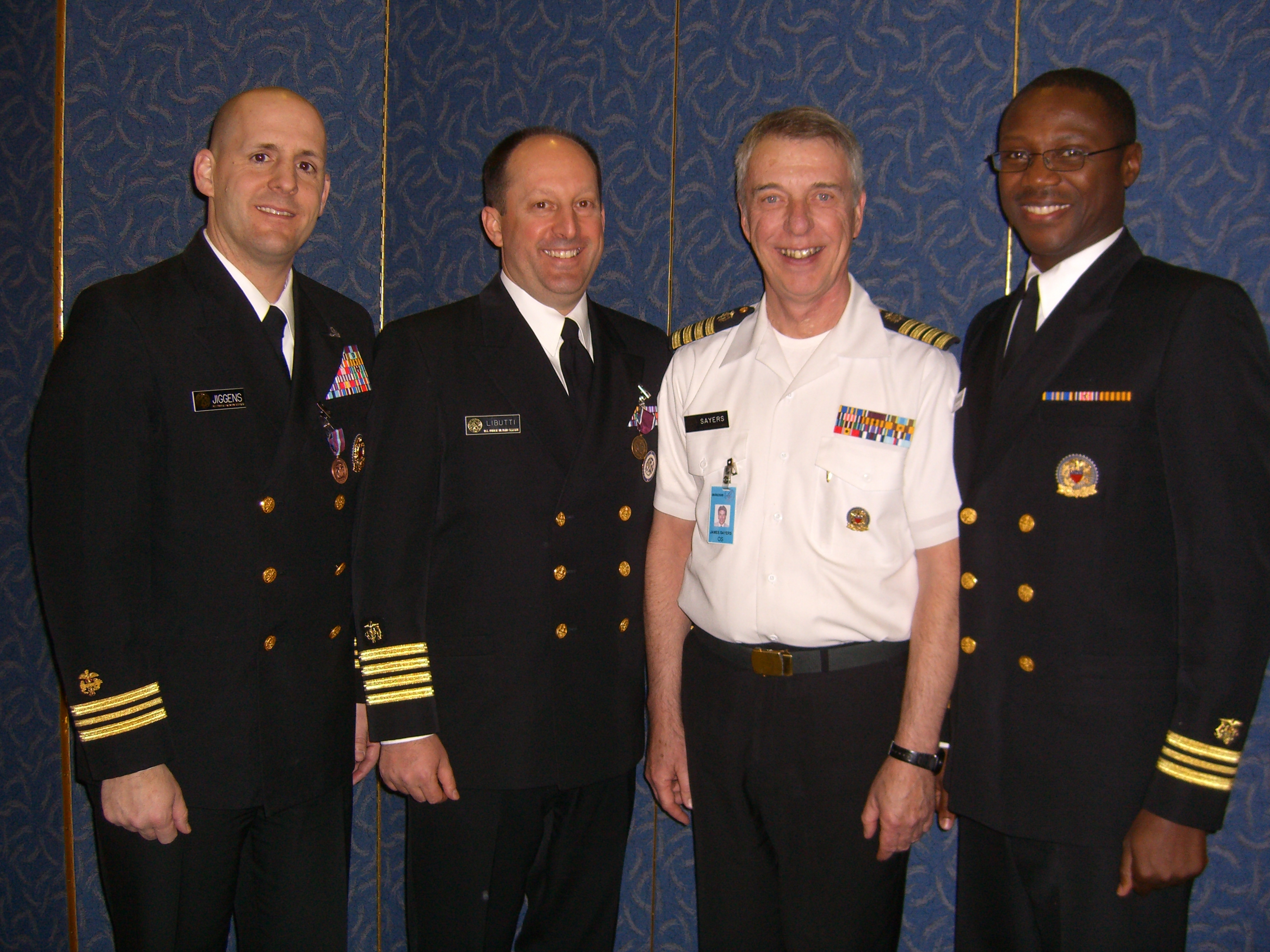
USPHS OPHS Awards Ceremony, January 10, 2008. (l-r) LCDR Timothy Jiggens (Achievement Medal), CAPT Steven Libutti (Commendation Medal), CAPT James Sayers (Director, Office of Reserve Affairs) and LCDR Dimitrus Culbreath (Commendation Medal).

== Uniformed service awards ==
Libutti received the following uniformed service awards and decorations:

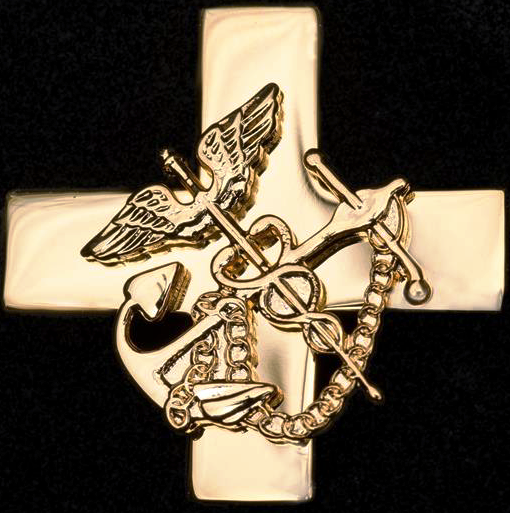

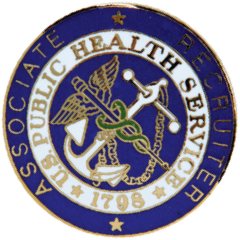

Public Health Service Commendation Medal
Public Health Service Outstanding Unit Citation	Public Health Service Crisis Response Service Award	Public Health Service Bicentennial Unit Commendation Award
National Defense Service Medal	Global War on Terrorism Service Medal	Commissioned Corps Training Ribbon
Field Medical Readiness Badge		USPHS Associate Recruiter Badge

== Personal life ==
Libutti married Mary Douros (a physical therapist) in 1990. They have three children; Christina Marie (born August 31, 1992), Melissa Dina (born May 11, 1995) and Michael Dennis (born June 12, 2002). His sister, Eileen Libutti, is an attorney in New York.
