= Anne Schuchat =

American physician (born 1960)

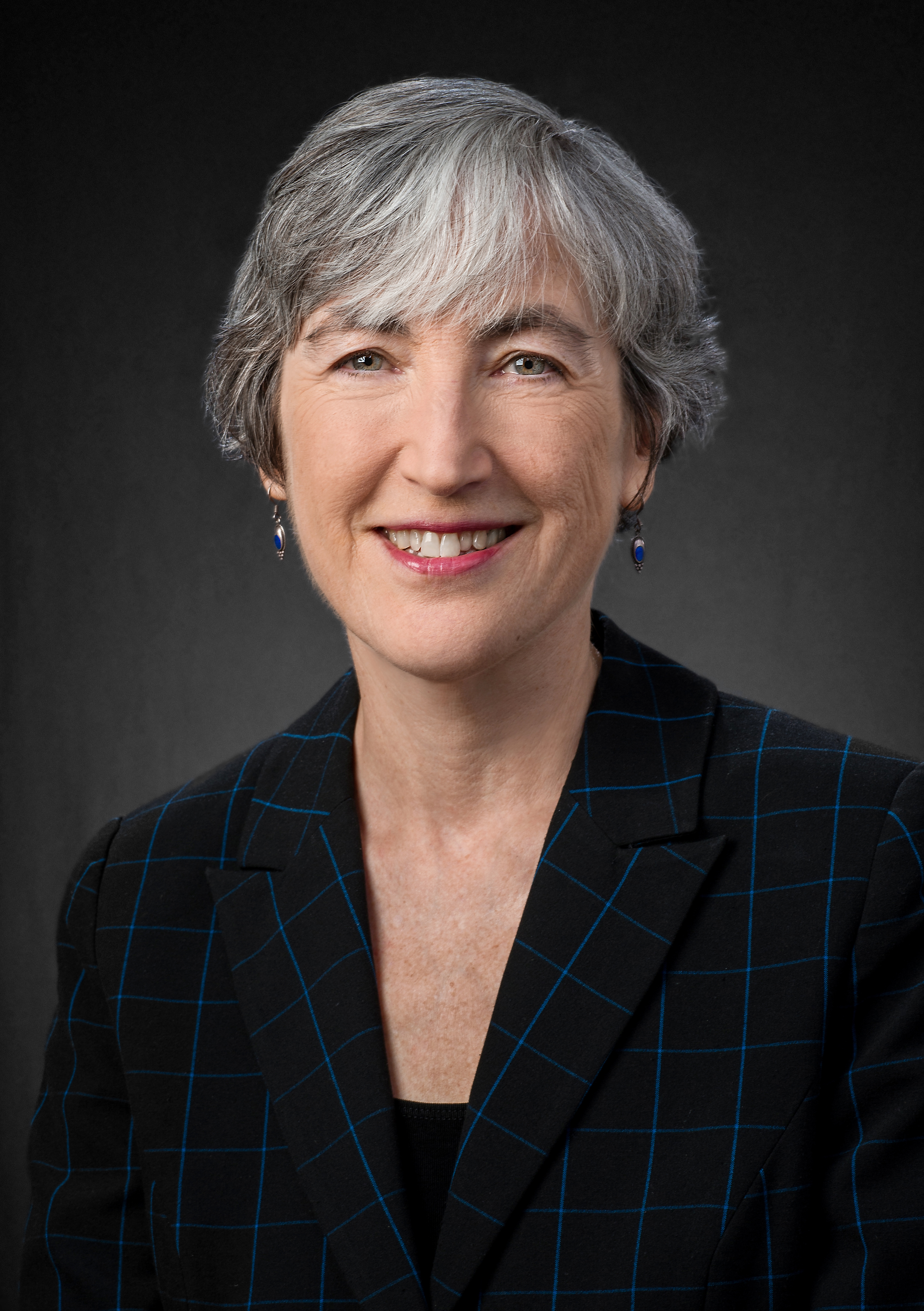
- Official portrait, 2018

Principal Deputy Director of the Centers for Disease Control and Prevention
- In office September 2015 – May 2021
- President: Barack Obama; Donald Trump; Joe Biden
- Preceded by: Ileana Arias
- Succeeded by: Debra Houry (acting)

Acting Director of the Centers for Disease Control and Prevention
- In office January 31, 2018 – March 26, 2018
- President: Donald Trump
- Preceded by: Brenda Fitzgerald
- Succeeded by: Robert R. Redfield
- In office January 20, 2017 – July 7, 2017
- President: Donald Trump
- Preceded by: Tom Frieden
- Succeeded by: Brenda Fitzgerald

Personal details
- Born: 1960 (age 65–66)
- Education: Swarthmore College (BS); Dartmouth College (MD)
- Website: Government website

Military service
- Allegiance: United States
- Branch/service: U.S. Public Health Service
- Years of service: 1999–2018
- Rank: Rear admiral
- Unit: PHS Commissioned Corps
- Commands: Anthrax Emergency Response Team; National Center for Immunization and Respiratory Diseases; Interim Deputy Director for Science and Public Health
- Battles/wars: 2001 anthrax attacks SARS outbreak 2009 flu pandemic

Anne Schuchat (born 1960) is an American medical doctor. She is a former rear admiral and assistant surgeon general in the United States Public Health Service Commissioned Corps. She also served as the principal deputy director of the Centers for Disease Control and Prevention (CDC). In May 2021, Schuchat stepped down from her post.

== Early life and education ==
Schuchat grew up in a Jewish family in Washington, D.C., the fourth of five children. Her grandfather was a kosher butcher from West Virginia. Schuchat graduated with highest honors from Swarthmore College in 1980 and graduated with honors from Dartmouth Medical School in 1984.

== Career ==
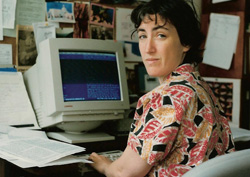
Schuchat at work in the mid-1990s.

Schuchat served as resident and chief resident in internal medicine at New York University's Manhattan V.A. Hospital before beginning her public health career at CDC as an Epidemic Intelligence Service (EIS) officer in NCID.

Having worked with the CDC on immunization, respiratory, and other infectious diseases since 1988, she served as the Interim Deputy Director for Science and Public Health at the CDC from February 2009 to June 2009. She has also held other posts in the CDC.

During the 2001 anthrax attacks, Schuchat served on CDC's Anthrax Emergency Response Team, which was tasked with investigating the attacks.

From February 2009 to June 2009, Schuchat was the Interim Deputy Director for Science and Public Health Program at the CDC, where she focused on ensuring strong science and programmatic approaches were effectively integrated into planning across the agency. She has emphasized prevention of infectious diseases in children. Her emphasis on perinatal group B streptococcal disease prevention has led to an 80 percent reduction in newborn infections and a 75 percent narrowing of racial disparities among sufferers of this infectious disease. She has been instrumental in pre- and post-licensure evaluations of conjugate vaccines for bacterial meningitis and pneumonia and in accelerating availability of these new vaccines in resource-poor countries through WHO and the Global Alliance for Vaccines and Immunization.

From January 20, 2017, through July 7, 2017, Schuchat served as acting director of the CDC (and as acting Administrator for the Agency for Toxic Substances and Disease Registry) and again from January 31, 2018, through March 26, 2018, when she was succeeded by Robert R. Redfield as Director.

Schuchat has been active in the CDC's efforts to combat the 2020 Coronavirus outbreak in the United States. In a February 25, 2020 HHS briefing on the "China coronavirus" she famously stated "It’s very important to say that our efforts at containment so far have worked, and the virus is actually contained here in the United States." A May 1, 2020 CDC report authored by Schuchat noted that based on this containment belief federal and local jurisdictions did not recommend restrictions on gatherings, and that several large events consequently held at the end of February played a notable role in the spread of COVID-19 in the United States.

In a valedictory retirement message, Schuchat wrote that “public health successes usually take place out of the spotlight and under the radar, which for most of us in this field is just fine; victory often means preventing something bad from happening” and, acknowledging that “the Covid-19 pandemic [was] as large a disrupter as a world war,” expressed "hope this is also a moment when a new generation is called to action, to experience the difficulty and meaning and joy of public service. Our world needs you."

== In popular culture ==
- The fictional character of Erin Mears in the 2011 film Contagion is partially based on Schuchat and her career. British actress Kate Winslet, who portrays the character, consulted with Schuchat in the process of preparing for the role.

== Personal life ==
Schuchat is married and has no children; she has three brothers and one sister. In May 2005, Schuchat received an honorary doctorate in science from Swarthmore College, from which she graduated in 1980.

== Awards and decorations ==
- 2005: Swarthmore College, Honorary Doctorate in Science
- American Public Health Association, Maternal and Child Health Young Investigator Award
- United States Public Health Service, USPHS Physician Research Officer of the Year

=== United States Public Health Service Commissioned Corps ===

1st row	Public Health Service Meritorious Service Medal		Public Health Service Outstanding Service Medal
2nd row	Public Health Service Commendation Medal	Public Health Service Achievement Medal	Public Health Service Outstanding Unit Citation
3rd row	Public Health Service Unit Commendation	Public Health Service Bicentennial Unit Commendation Award	Public Health Service Foreign Duty Award
4th row	Public Health Service Crisis Response Service Award	Public Health Service Regular Corps Ribbon	Commissioned Officers Association Ribbon

== Selected works and publications ==
- Schuchat, Anne; Robinson, Katherine; Wenger, Jay D.; Harrison, Lee H.; Farley, Monica; Reingold, Arthur L.; Lefkowitz, Lewis; Perkins, Bradley A. (October 2, 1997). "Bacterial Meningitis in the United States in 1995". New England Journal of Medicine. 337 (14): 970–976. doi:10.1056/NEJM199710023371404. ISSN 0028-4793. PMID 9395430. Wikidata ()
- Jernigan, Daniel B.; Raghunathan, Pratima L.; Bell, Beth P.; Brechner, Ross; Bresnitz, Eddy A.; Butler, Jay C.; Cetron, Marty; Cohen, Mitch; Doyle, Timothy; Fischer, Marc; Greene, Carolyn; Griffith, Kevin S.; Guarner, Jeannette; Hadler, James L.; Hayslett, James A.; Meyer, Richard; Petersen, Lyle R.; Phillips, Michael; Pinner, Robert; Popovic, Tanja; Quinn, Conrad P.; Reefhuis, Jennita; Reissman, Dori; Rosenstein, Nancy; Schuchat, Anne; Shieh, Wun-Ju; Siegal, Larry; Swerdlow, David L.; Tenover, Fred C.; Traeger, Marc; Ward, John W.; Weisfuse, Isaac; Wiersma, Steven; Yeskey, Kevin; Zaki, Sherif; Ashford, David A.; Perkins, Bradley A.; Ostroff, Steve; Hughes, James; Fleming, David; Koplan, Jeffrey P.; Gerberding, Julie L. (October 2002). "Investigation of Bioterrorism-Related Anthrax, United States, 2001: Epidemiologic Findings". Emerging Infectious Diseases. 8 (10): 1019–1028. doi:10.3201/EID0810.020353. PMC 2730292. PMID 12396909. Wikidata ()
- Whitney, Cynthia G.; Farley, Monica M.; Hadler, James; Harrison, Lee H.; Bennett, Nancy M.; Lynfield, Ruth; Reingold, Arthur; Cieslak, Paul R.; Pilishvili, Tamara; Jackson, Delois; Facklam, Richard R.; Jorgensen, James H.; Schuchat, Anne (May 2003). "Decline in Invasive Pneumococcal Disease after the Introduction of Protein–Polysaccharide Conjugate Vaccine". New England Journal of Medicine. 348 (18): 1737–1746. doi:10.1056/NEJMoa022823. ISSN 0028-4793. PMID 12724479. Wikidata ()
