= Nancy Messonnier =

American physician (born 1965)

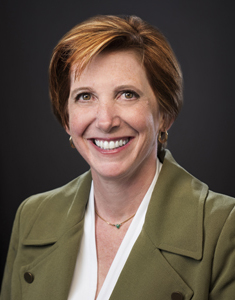

Director of the National Center for Immunization and Respiratory Diseases at the Centers for Disease Control and Prevention
- In office April 4, 2016 – May 14, 2021
- Preceded by: Anne Schuchat
- Succeeded by: Sam Posner (acting)

Personal details
- Born: Nancy Ellen Rosenstein; November 1965 (age 60) Philadelphia, Pennsylvania, U.S.
- Spouse: Mark Messonnier
- Relatives: Rod Rosenstein (brother)
- Education: University of Pennsylvania (BA); University of Chicago (MD)
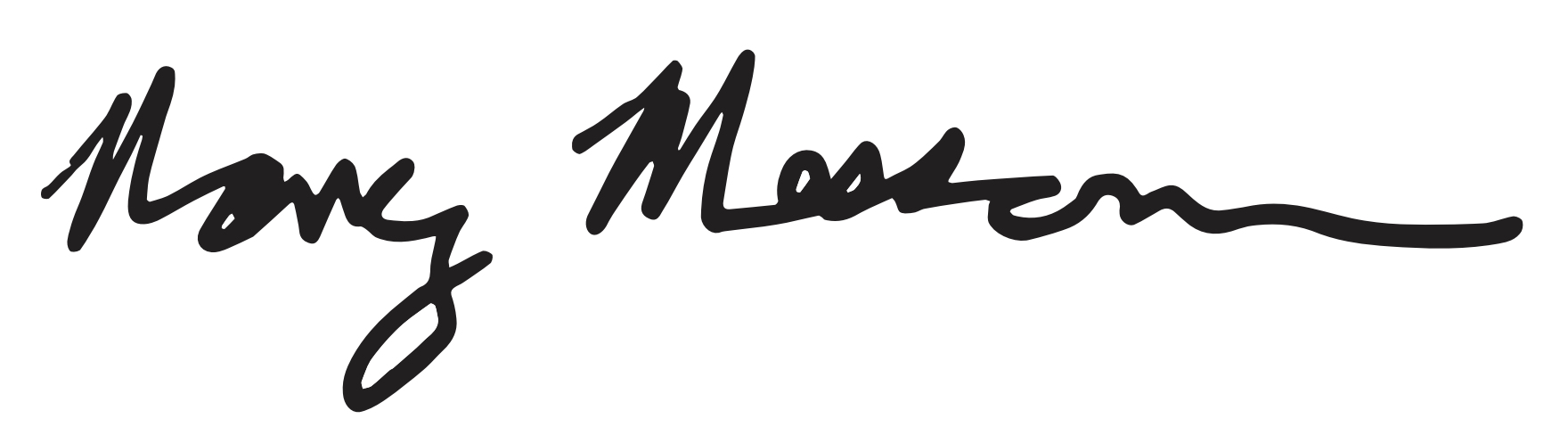
- Signature

Military service
- Allegiance: United States
- Service: U.S. Public Health Service
- Rank: Captain
- Unit: PHS Commissioned Corps

Nancy Ellen Messonnier (née Rosenstein; born November 1965) is an American physician, currently serving as dean of the Gillings School of Global Public Health at the University of North Carolina at Chapel Hill since September 2022.

She previously served as director of the National Center for Immunization and Respiratory Diseases at the Centers for Disease Control and Prevention from 2016 to 2021. She worked on the CDC's response to the COVID-19 pandemic in the United States.

== Early life and education ==
Messonnier was born in Philadelphia, Pennsylvania, to Robert Rosenstein, who ran a small business, and Gerri Rosenstein, a bookkeeper and local school board president. She grew up in Lower Moreland Township, Pennsylvania, with her brother Rod Rosenstein.

Messonnier graduated from Lower Moreland High School in Lower Moreland Township. She received her Bachelor of Arts degree from the University of Pennsylvania in 1987. She then attended the University of Chicago School of Medicine, where she received her Doctor of Medicine in 1992. She then returned to the University of Pennsylvania for her residency training in internal medicine between 1992 and 1995.

== Career ==
=== Centers for Disease Control and Prevention ===
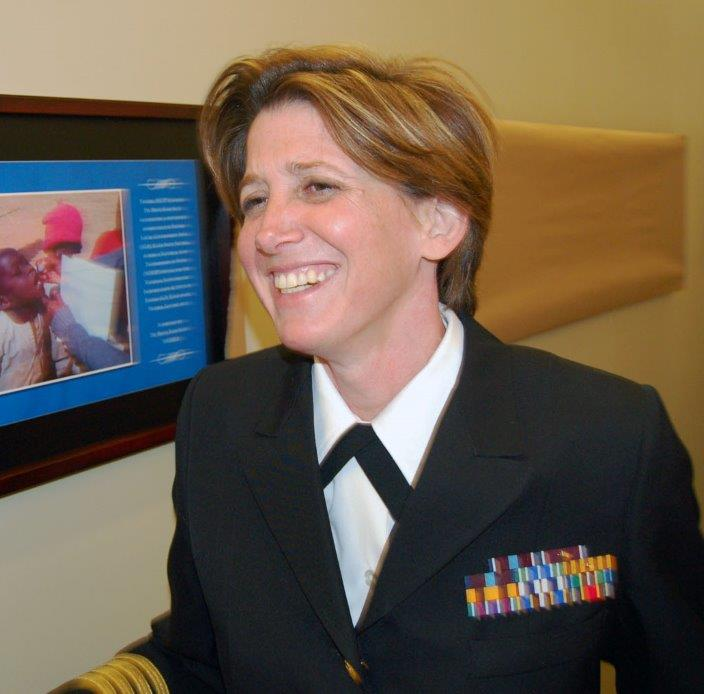
Messonnier in 2013

Messonnier began her career in public health in 1995 as an epidemic intelligence service officer in the National Center for Infectious Diseases, a program of the Centers for Disease Control and Prevention (CDC). During her tenure at the CDC, she led the Meningitis and Vaccine Preventable Diseases Branch in NCIRD's Division of Bacterial Diseases from 2007 to 2012. She also served as the deputy director of NCIRD from 2014 to 2016 before becoming director of the center on April 4, 2016.

During the course of her career, Messonnier notably worked on the 2001 anthrax attacks response, serving as co-leader of the anthrax management team and vaccine working group. She also played a leading role developing a low-cost meningococcal meningitis vaccine to prevent an emerging epidemic in Africa, known as MenAfriVac, in 2010. She has also worked on communications strategies to promote the use of vaccines to prevent the emergence of disease outbreaks.

==== COVID-19 pandemic in the United States ====
Starting January 2020, Messonnier helped lead the CDC efforts to address and combat the emerging threat of COVID-19, the disease caused by the novel coronavirus (SARS-CoV-2). When 195 Americans were evacuated out of Wuhan because of the virus, the CDC moved to quarantine all of them, with Messonnier noting: "While we realize this is an unprecedented action, this is an unprecedented threat."

In a February 25 press briefing at the White House, Messonnier warned of the impending community spread of the virus in the United States, stating: "Disruption to everyday life might be severe." Following her comments during the February White House press briefing, she did not appear again at the briefing, and there was speculation that Messonnier had been "silenced" for her comments stressing the growing urgency of the COVID-19 pandemic in the United States. On February 28, she said that the U.S. "acted incredibly quickly before most other countries. Aggressively controlled our borders and we were able to slow the spread into the United States. ...We have been testing aggressively." While Messonnier no longer appeared in White House briefings, she continued giving regular CDC briefings, which were broadcast to the public, until April 2020, and she made public appearances in All Things Considered on NPR.

On March 9, 2020, she cautioned those who were at high risk of severe illness, including the elderly and people with pre-existing conditions, to take cautionary measures such as stocking up on groceries and medications, and preparing to shelter in place for the foreseeable future. She also addressed concerns around the CDC and FDA's failure to get working COVID-19 testing kits into the hands of public health officials in a timely manner to enable better containment of the disease and mitigation of its spread. On January 21, 2020, she announced that the CDC had finalized its own COVID-19 test. On February 5, the CDC began distributing diagnostic tests to public-health laboratories; however, several of those tests had contaminated reagents, rendering them useless, and leading to a major gap in fighting the outbreak. The situation was exacerbated by FDA-imposed regulations on testing, making it difficult for independent development of COVID-19 tests to fill the CDC's distribution gap.

On May 7, 2021, she told colleagues she was resigning from the CDC effective May 14, saying "now is the best time for me to transition to a new phase of my career." She said she would become executive director for pandemic and public health systems at the Skoll Foundation, based in Palo Alto, California.

=== UNC Chapel Hill ===
On June 22, 2022, the University of North Carolina at Chapel Hill announced that Messonnier had been appointed to serve as dean of the Gillings School of Global Public Health of the university, effective September 1, 2022.

== Personal life ==
Messonnier is married to Mark L. Messonnier. She is the sister of Rod Rosenstein.

== Awards and honors ==
- 2000: Centers for Disease Control and Prevention, Iain C. Hardy Memorial Award
- 2011: Philip Horne Award, National Center for Immunization and Respiratory Diseases

=== United States Public Health Service Commissioned Corps ===
Public Health Service Outstanding Unit Citation ribbon	Public Health Service Outstanding Unit Citation, June 12, 2016 For enabling the unprecedented use of an investigational serogroup B meningococcal vaccine
	Public Health Service Presidential Unit Citation, June 7, 2016 For Ebola response
	Public Health Service Outstanding Unit Citation, February 17, 2016 For excellent response to national outbreak of severe respiratory illness
	Public Health Service Outstanding Unit Citation, November 25, 2014 For investigation of two state-wide pertussis epidemics
	Public Health Service Unit Commendation, November 29, 2012 For National Park Service CDC Zoonotic Team
	Public Health Service Unit Commendation, October 27, 2010 For response to an outbreak of meningococcal disease in the Upper East Region of Ghana
	Public Health Service Outstanding Unit Citation, August 9, 2010 For leading the U.S. Department of Health and Human Services response to the 2009 influenza pandemic
	Public Health Service Outstanding Unit Citation, April 15, 2010 For emergence of Ciprofloxacin-resistant Neisseria meningitidis in North America
	Public Health Service Outstanding Unit Citation, April 29, 2009 For exemplary work in assisting state and local health departments in multiple pertussis outbreaks
	Public Health Service Outstanding Unit Citation, April 29, 2009 For service preventing childhood pneumonia and meningitis by increasing adoption of vaccines in developing countries
	Public Health Service Outstanding Unit Citation, December 16, 2008 For designing hands-on laboratory training courses to increase global meningitis disease surveillance
	Public Health Service Unit Commendation, June 19, 2008 For service on the Awards Board and support to the U.S. Public Health Service awards process
	Public Health Service Unit Commendation, February 23, 2007 For outstanding teamwork, scientific, and community interaction in the investigation of an anthrax case
	Public Health Service Outstanding Service Medal, January 12, 2006 For outstanding leadership to improve control and prevention of meningococcal disease in the United States and Africa
	Public Health Service Unit Commendation, October 27, 2005 For collaborating with health agencies in assessment and response to accidental exposure to Bacillus anthracis
	Public Health Service Outstanding Unit Citation, March – July 2003 For the investigation and control of SARS during the acute public health response
	Public Health Service Outstanding Unit Citation, January – July 2002 For responding to the serogroup W135 meningococcal disease epidemic in Burkina Faso
	Public Health Service Outstanding Unit Citation, September 2001 – March 2002 For outstanding service in responding to terrorist attacks
	Public Health Service Crisis Response Service Award, October 2001 – January 2002 For participation in the World Trade Center and anthrax response
	Public Health Service Commendation Medal, October 1997 – March 2001 For evaluation of risk of meningococcal disease in college students and development of vaccine strategies
	Public Health Service Outstanding Unit Citation, July 1998 – October 1998 For the Leptospirosis response
	Public Health Service Achievement Medal, July 1997 – June 1998 For meningococcal disease surveillance
	Public Health Service Commendation Medal, July 1997 – July 1998 For outstanding contributions to improve prevention of meningococcal disease in the United States and Africa
	Public Health Service Foreign Duty Award, January 1998 – December 1998
	Public Health Service Bicentennial Unit Commendation Award, January 1998

== Selected works and publications ==
- Traeger, Marc S.; Wiersma, Steven T.; Rosenstein, Nancy E.; Malecki, Jean M.; Shepard, Colin W.; Raghunathan, Pratima L.; Pillai, Segaran P.; Popovic, Tanja; Quinn, Conrad P.; Meyer, Richard F.; Zaki, Sharif R.; Kumar, Savita; Bruce, Sherrie M.; Sejvar, James J.; Dull, Peter M.; Tierney, Bruce C.; Jones, Joshua D.; Perkins, Bradley A. (October 2002). "First Case of Bioterrorism-Related Inhalational Anthrax in the United States, Palm Beach County, Florida, 2001". Emerging Infectious Diseases. 8 (10): 1029–1034. doi:10.3201/eid0810.020354. PMC 2730309. PMID 12396910. Wikidata ()
- Wright, Jennifer Gordon; Quinn, Conrad P.; Shadomy, Sean; Messonnier, Nancy; Centers for Disease Control and Prevention (CDC) (July 23, 2010). "Use of anthrax vaccine in the United States: recommendations of the Advisory Committee on Immunization Practices (ACIP), 2009". MMWR. Recommendations and Reports. 59 (RR-6): 1–30. PMID 20651644. Wikidata ()
- Novak, Ryan T; Kambou, Jean Ludovic; Diomandé, Fabien VK; Tarbangdo, Tiga F; Ouédraogo-Traoré, Rasmata; Sangaré, Lassana; Lingani, Clement; Martin, Stacey W; Hatcher, Cynthia; Mayer, Leonard W; LaForce, F Marc; Avokey, Fenella; Djingarey, Mamoudou H; Messonnier, Nancy E; Tiendrébéogo, Sylvestre R; Clark, Thomas A (October 2012). "Serogroup A meningococcal conjugate vaccination in Burkina Faso: analysis of national surveillance data". The Lancet Infectious Diseases. 12 (10): 757–764. doi:10.1016/S1473-3099(12)70168-8. PMC 4831863. PMID 22818241. Wikidata ()
- Patel, Anita; Jernigan, Daniel B.; Abdirizak, Fatuma; Abedi, Glen; Aggarwal, Sharad; Albina, Denise; Allen, Elizabeth; Andersen, Lauren; Anderson, Jade; Anderson, Megan; Anderson, Tara; Anderson, Kayla; Bardossy, Ana Cecilia; Barry, Vaughn; Beer, Karlyn; Bell, Michael; Berger, Sherri; Bertulfo, Joseph; Biggs, Holly; Bornemann, Jennifer; Bornstein, Josh; Bower, Willie; Bresee, Joseph; Brown, Clive; Budd, Alicia; Buigut, Jennifer; Burke, Stephen; Burke, Rachel; Burns, Erin; et al. (February 7, 2020). "Initial Public Health Response and Interim Clinical Guidance for the 2019 Novel Coronavirus Outbreak — United States, December 31, 2019–February 4, 2020". MMWR. Morbidity and Mortality Weekly Report. 69 (5): 140–146. doi:10.15585/mmwr.mm6905e1. PMC 7004396. PMID 32027631.
