= Elaine Jaffe =

American pathologist

Elaine S. Jaffe
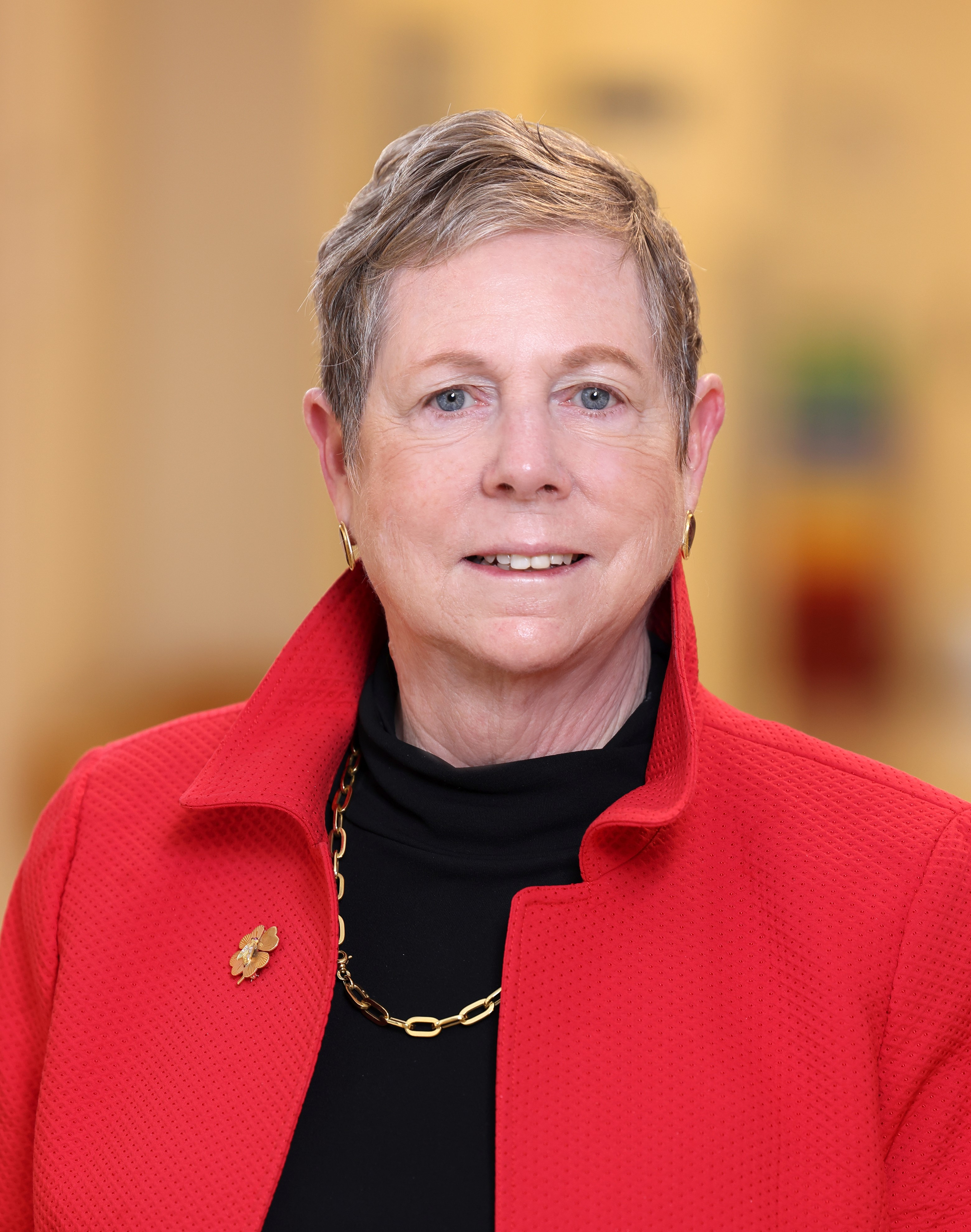
- Education: Cornell University; University of Pennsylvania
- Known for: Classification of Lymphomas; President of the Society for Hematopathology; Fellow of the American Association for the Advancement of Science
- Scientific career
- Fields: Hematopathology; Cancer research (leukemia & lymphoma)
- Workplaces: National Cancer Institute

Elaine Sarkin Jaffe (born in August 1943) is an American pathologist and senior investigator at the National Cancer Institute specializing in hematopathology. She completed her medical education at Cornell University and the University of Pennsylvania, receiving her M.D. degree from University of Pennsylvania in 1969. After an internship at Georgetown University she joined NCI as a resident in anatomic pathology, and has been a senior investigator since 1974, focusing on the classification and definition of lymphomas.

== Early life and education ==
Jaffe is the daughter of Ukrainian immigrants who fled Russia during World War I. As a child in White Plains, New York, Jaffe was drawn to the sciences, particularly astronomy and geology. In an interview she states, "I fell in love with biology and decided in high school that I was going to become a doctor." She received her undergraduate degree from Cornell University, and completed her medical education at the University of Pennsylvania in the late 1960s, where she was one of only five women in a class of more than 100 medical students.

In her second year of medical school, she met and married her husband Michael Evan Jaffe, then a law student. Jaffe and her husband have two sons.

Jaffe, her husband and first child moved to the Washington, D.C. area, where the Jaffes' second son was born. Jaffe took a residency position at Georgetown University and worked primarily in anatomic pathology. After a year at Georgetown, Jaffe entered an NCI residency program. Jaffe's early research at NCI helped replace purely descriptive classifications with those based on immunology which helped in the development process leading to today's disease-specific therapies. Jaffe and her fellow NCI researchers showed that red blood cells coated with antibody and erythrocyte-antibody-complement (EAC) adhered to B-cell areas, proving they were lymphocytes derived from the lymphoid follicles.

== Career ==
Jaffe's early work helped to provide a deeper understanding of the origin of lymphomas, especially follicular lymphoma. Her team notably elucidated the difference between T cell and B cell lymphomas.

Her lab's findings led to the development of the WHO Classification of Tumours of the Hematopoietic and Lymphoid Tissues. Jaffe was the president of the Society of Hematopathology at the time that the WHO's Revised European-American Classification of Lymphoid Neoplasms (REAL) classification system was developed in 1994; the REAL classification system is now considered the gold standard in hematopathology. Today, her research includes genetic and epigenetic studies aimed at understanding how B-cells become Hodgkin's lymphoma cells, particularly through the lens of the microenvironment. Jaffe's research has led to improvements in cancer treatments, including disease-specific therapies and improved clinical outcomes.

== Honors and awards ==
Jaffe has served on the editorial boards of the American Journal of Pathology, the American Journal of Surgical Pathology, Blood, Cancer Research, and Modern Pathology. She has also served as president of the Society for Hematopathology and the United States and Canadian Academy of Pathology (USCAP) (from 1998 to 1999). In 1993, Jaffe was elected a fellow of the American Association for the Advancement of Science (AAAS). In 2005 she was chair of the Medical Sciences Section of AAAS and in 2007 she was the second Anita Roberts Lecturer at the NIH. Jaffe is considered one of the most-cited researchers in clinical medicine by Science Watch and was among the top 10 in oncology between 1981 and 1998. She is an elected member of the Institute of Medicine.

=== Awards ===
- United States Public Health Service:
  - Public Health Service Commendation Medal, 1979
  - Public Health Service Meritorious Service Medal, 1984
  - Public Health Service Outstanding Service Medal, 1988
  - Surgeon General's Exemplary Service Medal, 1993
  - Public Health Service Unit Commendation, 1997
- Fred W. Stewart Award from Memorial-Sloan Kettering Cancer Center
- F.K. Mostofi Distinguished Service Award from the United States and Canadian Academy of Pathology, 2003
- Distinguished Clinical Teacher award from the NIH Fellows Committee
- National Cancer Institute Outstanding Mentor Award, 2011
- Doctorate Honoris Causa from the University of Barcelona, 2008
- Chugai Award for Excellence in Mentoring and Scholarship from the American Society for Investigative Pathology
- Henry M. Stratton Medal from the American Society of Hematology, 2013
- ASIP Rous-Whipple Award from the American Society for Investigative Pathology, 2016

== See also ==
- Surgical pathology
- List of pathologists
