= Assistant Secretary for Health's Exceptional Service Medal =

Assistant Secretary for Health Exceptional Service Medal
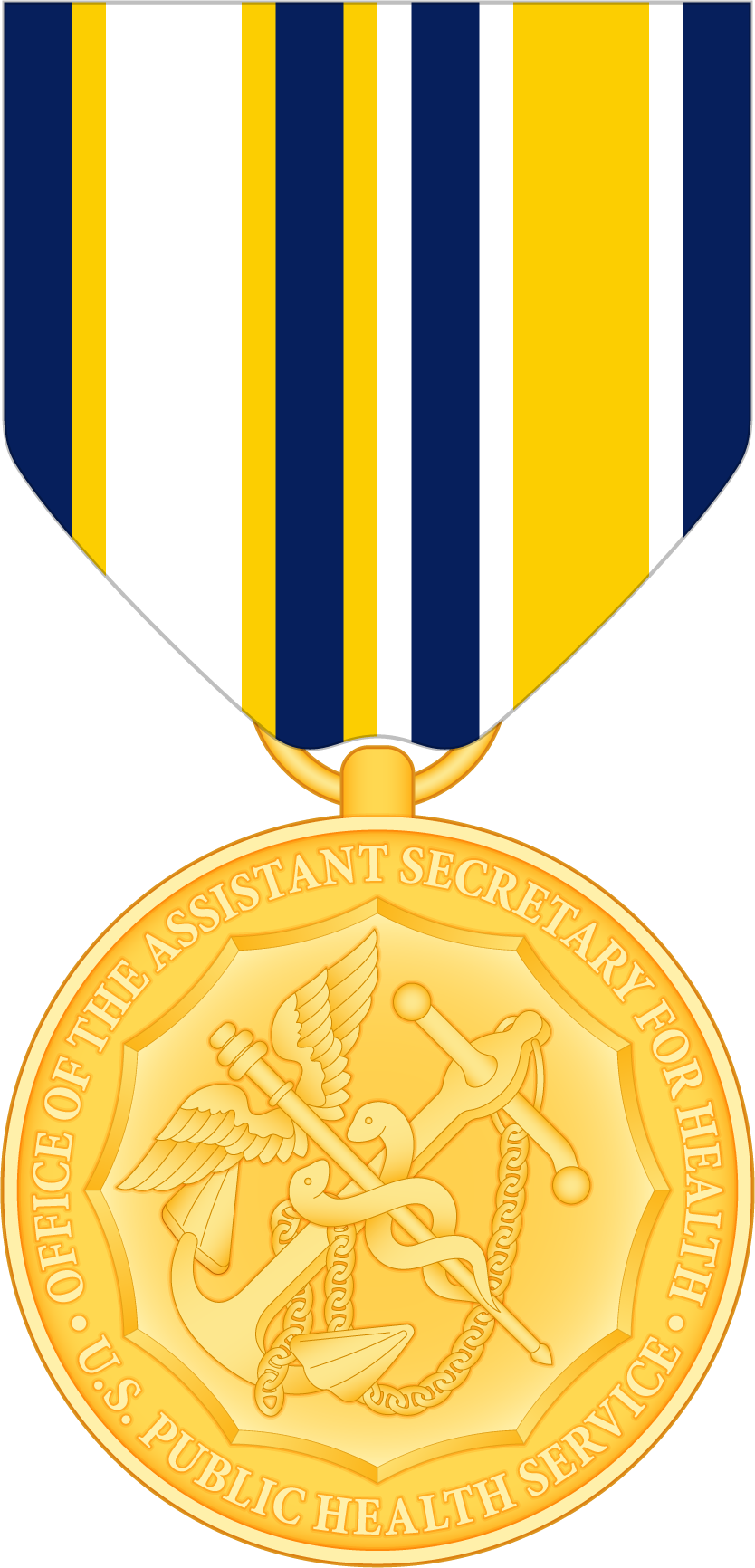
- Assistant Secretary for Health Exceptional Service Medal
- Type: Medal and ribbon
- Awarded for: The highest level of contribution to initiatives of the Assistant Secretary for Health.
- Presented by: the Assistant Secretary for Health
- Eligibility: Members of the Uniformed Services of the United States
- Ribbon

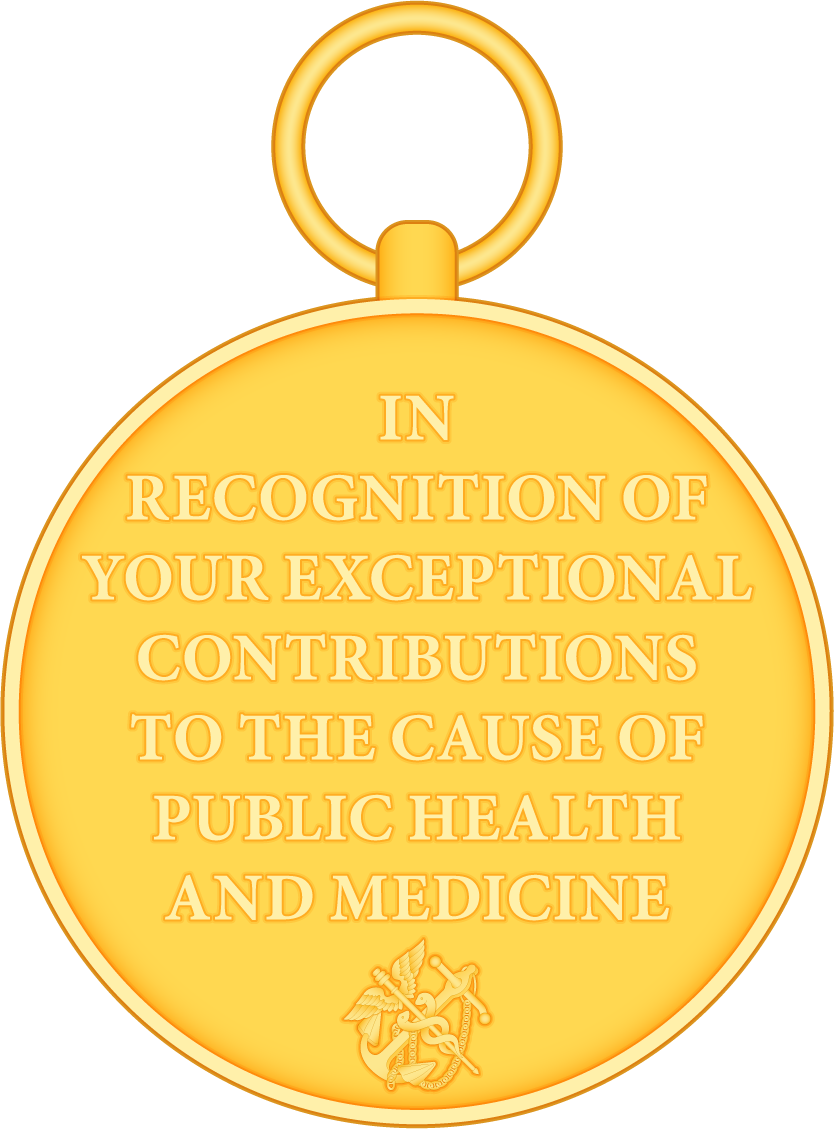
- Reverse
- Status: Current

Precedence
- Next (higher): Public Health Service Meritorious Service Medal
- Next (lower): Surgeon General's Medallion

The Assistant Secretary for Health's Exceptional Service Medal is an award of the US Public Health Service. Administered by the Assistant Secretary for Health, the medal is awarded at the sole discretion of the Assistant Secretary for Health.

== Criteria ==
The Assistant Secretary for Health's Exceptional Service Medal is awarded at the sole discretion of an Assistant Secretary of Health who serves as a member of the United States Public Health Service Commissioned Corps to a member of any Uniformed Services of the United States. This award is administered by the Office of the Assistant Secretary for Health. As the award is bestowed at the discretion of an Assistant Secretary of Health who serves in uniform, there is no nomination procedure.
