= Libutti =

Libutti is a surname. Notable people with the surname include:

- Frank Libutti (born 1945), retired United States Marine Corps Lieutenant General
- Lorenzo Libutti (born 1997), Italian footballer
- Steven Libutti (born 1964), American surgeon and scientist
