= Surgeon General's Medallion =

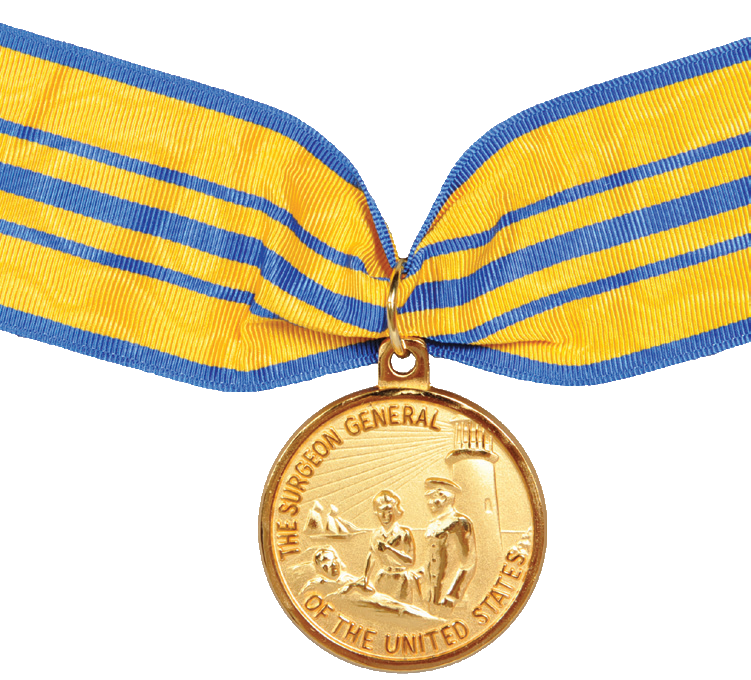
- Surgeon General's Medallion ribbon
- Type: Medal and ribbon
- Presented by: the Surgeon General of the United States
- Eligibility: exceptional achievement to the cause of public health and medicine.
- Status: Current
- Ribbon of the Surgeon General's Medallion

Precedence
- Next (higher): Public Health Service Meritorious Service Medal
- Next (lower): Surgeon General's Exemplary Service Medal

The Surgeon General's Medallion is the fourth highest award of the Public Health Service and the United States Public Health Service Commissioned Corps. The medal is awarded in the name of the United States surgeon general for actions of exceptional achievement to the cause of public health and medicine. It is awarded by the surgeon general of the United States.

The exact award criteria for the Surgeon General's Medal are open to the interpretation of the sitting U.S. surgeon general. Typically, the Surgeon General's Medal is presented for such actions as medical breakthroughs in public medicine, disease prevention and control, or exceptional service in a senior position of the Department of Health and Human Services.

Due to the prestige of the Surgeon General's Medallion, the award is authorized for wear on active duty uniforms of the United States armed forces. When worn on the uniform of a member of the Public Health Service Commissioned Corps, the ribbon is worn after the Public Health Service Meritorious Service Medal and before the Department of Commerce Silver Medal, the Surgeon General's Exemplary Service Medal and the Legion of Merit.

== See also ==
- Awards and decorations of the Public Health Service
