= Military Officers Association of America =

US based military professional organization

- Logo
- Abbreviation: MOAA
- Formation: February 23, 1929 (97 years ago)
- Type: Veterans' organization
- Headquarters: Alexandria, Virginia
- Region served: United States
- Members: 350,000
- Chairman of the Board: Gen. Thomas D. Waldhauser, USMC (Ret)
- President: Lt. Gen. Brian T. Kelly, USAF (Ret.)
- Board of directors: Directors elected by membership
- Publication: Military Officer
- Website: moaa.org
- Formerly called: Retired Officers Association

The Military Officers Association of America (MOAA) is a professional association of United States military officers. It is a nonprofit organization that advocates for a strong national defense, but is politically nonpartisan. The association supports government policies that benefit military members and their families. Its membership is made up of active duty, retired, and former commissioned officers and warrant officers from the uniformed services of the United States.

== History ==
Originally called the Retired Officers Association, the organization that is now the Military Officers Association of America was founded in 1929. The association's first headquarters in Los Angeles, California. The association's goal was to provide advice and assistance to fellow military officers throughout United States. The organization also promoted fraternal relations among America's uniformed services.

The association moved its headquarters into the District of Columbia area in 1944. At that time, the organization had approximately 2,600 members. In 2002, the association changed its name to the Military Officers Association of America. The change took effect on 1 January 2003.

Today, the Military Officers Association of America has over 350,000 members. It is the largest military officers' organization in the United States. In addition to supporting a strong national defense program, the association provides military benefits counseling, career transition assistance, and educational assistance for children of military families (including families of enlisted personnel).

== Organization ==
Membership in the association is open to active duty, retired, and former commissioned officers and warrant officers from the uniformed services of the United States including the National Guard and Reserve components. The eight uniformed services are the United States Army, the United States Marine Corps, the United States Navy, the United States Air Force, the United States Space Force, the United States Coast Guard, the United States Public Health Service Commissioned Corps, and the National Oceanic and Atmospheric Administration Commissioned Officer Corps. Surviving spouses of deceased officers are eligible for membership.

The association is governed by a board of directors. The board is composed of members from all eight uniformed services. Board members also represent six geographic regions. The membership elects its chairman and three vice chairmen. The board elects the association's president, chief financial officer, and secretary. The president oversees the association's day-to-day operations. The association's headquarters is located in Alexandria, Virginia.

== Advocacy ==
The association promotes military professionals and encourages government policies that support military members and their families. The association staff identifies important national defense issues and provides association members with regular updates on key issues and pending legislation. The association advocates for a strong national defense, but does not get involved in military strategy debates or support specific weapons systems.

== See also ==
- Commissioned Officers Association of the U.S. Public Health Service
- Reserve Officers Association
