= Public Health Service Citation Medal =

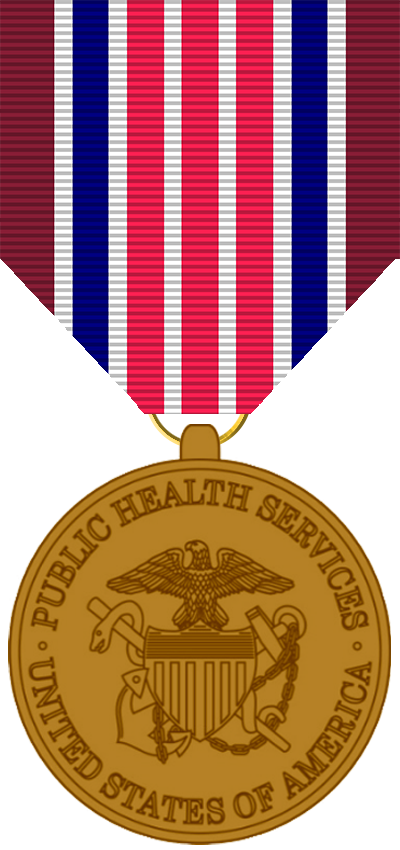
- Public Health Service Citation Medal
- Type: Honor award (medal and ribbon)
- Awarded for: Specific and noteworthy achievements
- Country: United States
- Presented by: the United States Public Health Service
- Eligibility: Members of the United States Public Health Service Commissioned Corps and members of any other Uniformed Service of the United States
- Ribbon
- Status: Currently awarded

Precedence
- Next (higher): NOAA Corps Achievement Medal
- Next (lower): Commandant's Letter of Commendation Ribbon

The Public Health Service Citation Medal is a decoration of the United States Public Health Service presented to members of the United States Public Health Service Commissioned Officer Corps and to members of any Uniformed Services of the United States whose accomplishments or achievements are of outstanding or unique significance to the missions of the Corps. It is the tenth-highest award awarded by the United States Public Health Service Commissioned Corps.

== Criteria ==
The PHS Achievement Medal is awarded to an officer in recognition of a specific and noteworthy achievement, generally for a short period of time. This could include contributions toward accomplishing a program objective or high quality achievement, but at a lesser level than is required for the achievement medal.

== See also ==
- Awards and decorations of the Public Health Service
- Awards and decorations of the United States government
