= Awards and decorations of the Public Health Service =

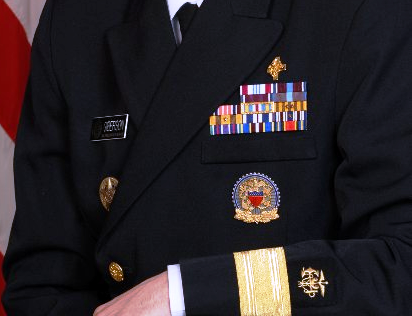
Example of awards, special skills badge, and identification badges of the USPHS Commissioned Corps as worn on the service dress uniform of RADM Scott Giberson.

The United States Public Health Service Commissioned Corps (PHSCC), one of the eight uniformed services of the United States, has the authority to issue various awards, commendations, and other insignia to its members. These include individual honor awards, unit honor awards, service awards, training ribbons, special skill badges, and identification badges. The following PHSCC awards are listed in the service's order of precedence:

== Personal awards and decorations ==
USPHSCC Awards and Decorations poster, 2015.

An overview of awards for the Commissioned Corps as of 2021

Public Health Service Distinguished Service Medal	Public Health Service Meritorious Service Medal	Assistant Secretary for Health's Exceptional Service Medal	Surgeon General's Medallion	Surgeon General's Exemplary Service Medal
– worn after the Defense Distinguished Service Medal and before the Homeland Security Distinguished Service Medal	– worn after the Purple Heart and before the Defense Meritorious Service Medal	– awarded at the discretion of the Assistant Secretary for Health, worn after the Meritorious Service Medal and before the Surgeon General's Medallion	– worn after the Assistant Secretary for Health's Exceptional Service Medal and before the Surgeon General's Exemplary Service Medal	– worn after the Surgeon General's Medallion and before the Department of Commerce Bronze Medal
Public Health Service Outstanding Service Medal	Public Health Service Commendation Medal	Public Health Service Achievement Medal	Public Health Service Citation Medal	
– worn after the Air Medal and before the NOAA Administrator's Award	– worn after the Aerial Achievement Medal and before the Joint Service Commendation Medal	– worn after the Department of Transportation Superior Achievement Medal and before the Achievement Medal of other uniformed services	– worn after the NOAA Corps Achievement Medal and before the Commandant's Letter of Commendation Ribbon	

== Unit awards ==
Public Health Service Presidential Unit Citation – the highest unit decoration of the Public Health Service.
Public Health Service Outstanding Unit Citation – the second highest unit decoration of the Public Health Service.
Public Health Service Unit Commendation – the third highest unit decoration of the Public Health Service.

== Service and campaign awards ==
Public Health Service Smallpox Eradication Campaign Ribbon	Public Health Service Global Health Campaign Medal	Public Health Service Ebola Campaign Medal	Public Health Service COVID-19 Pandemic Campaign Medal	Public Health Service Hazardous Duty Award
Ribbon Only				
Public Health Service Foreign Duty Award	Public Health Service Special Assignment Award	Public Health Service Isolated/Hardship Award	Public Health Service Crisis Response Service Award	Public Health Service Global Response Service Award
Public Health Service Response Service Award	Public Health Service National Emergency Preparedness Award	Public Health Service Recruitment Service Award	Public Health Service Global Health Initiative Service Medal	Public Health Service Bicentennial Unit Commendation Award
Public Health Service Regular Corps Ribbon	Commissioned Corps Training Ribbon			
Ribbon Only	Ribbon Only			

== Association and organization awards ==
The following awards are awarded by various associations and organizations related the PHS mission and may be worn on the uniform (in order of precedence shown) when attending a function of that association:

Commissioned Officers Association of the U.S. Public Health Service (COA)
Association of Military Surgeons of the United States (AMSUS)
Reserve Officers Association (ROA)

== Attachments worn on ribbons ==
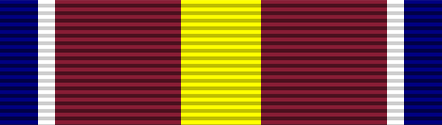
Bronze letter "V" device worn on the Distinguished Service, Meritorious Service, and the Outstanding Service Medals to indicate an award for valor.
5/16th inch gold stars are worn on the Distinguished Service, Meritorious Service, Surgeon General's Exemplary Service, Outstanding Service, Commendation, Achievement, and PHS Citation Medals to indicate subsequent awards.
In lieu of five gold 5/16th inch stars, a silver 5/16th inch star is worn.
3/16th inch service stars in bronze are worn on campaign, unit, and service awards to indicate subsequent awards. In lieu of five bronze stars, a silver star is worn.
A gold frame is placed around the Presidential Unit Citation to indicate a second award.
The Expeditionary Attachment is worn centered on the suspension ribbon and ribbon bar.

== Badges and insignia ==
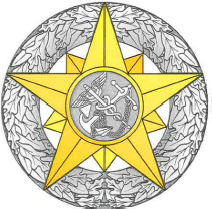
Assistant Secretary for Health

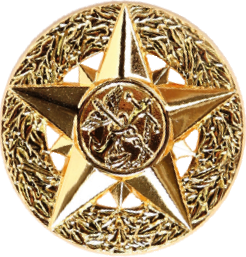
Surgeon General Badge

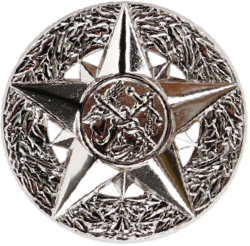
Deputy Surgeon General Badge

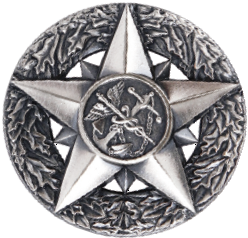
Officer-in-Charge Badge

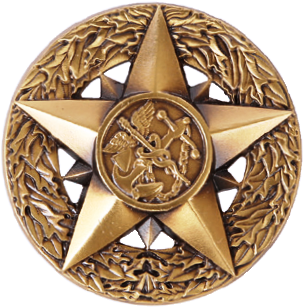
Chief Professional Officer Badge

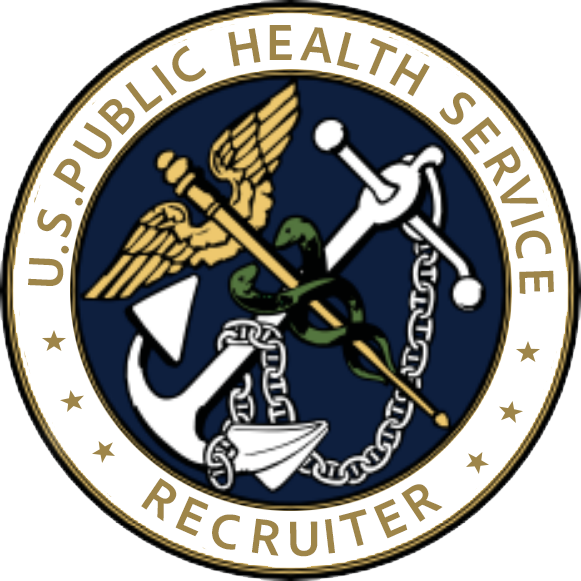
Recruiter Badge

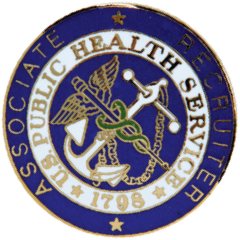
Associate Recruiter Badge

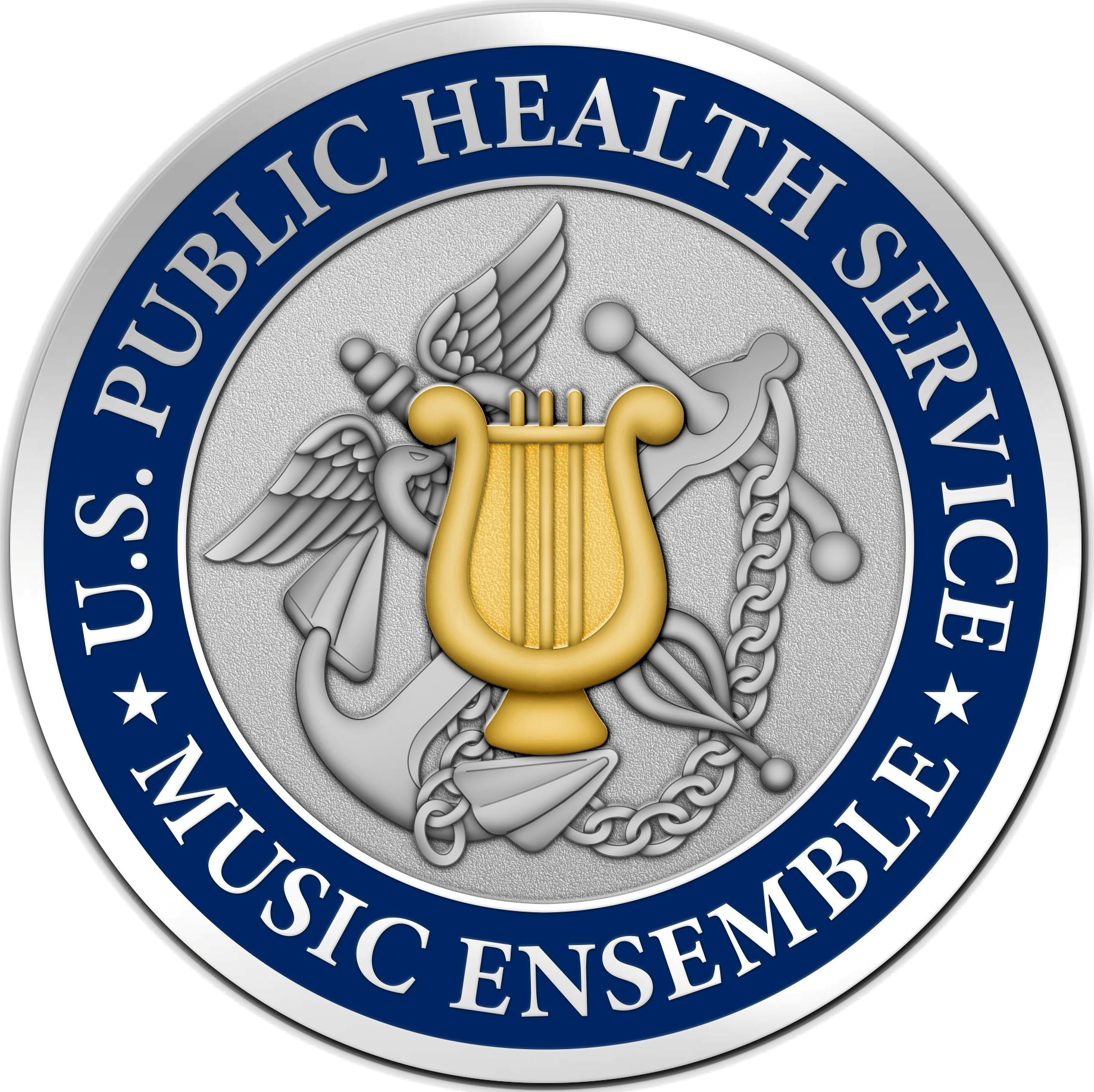
Music Ensemble Badge

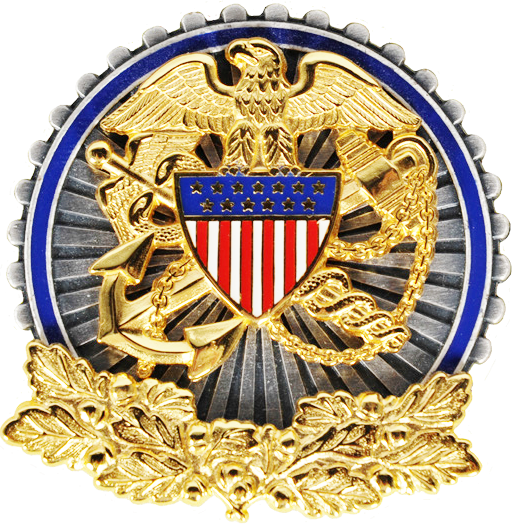
HHS Identification Badge

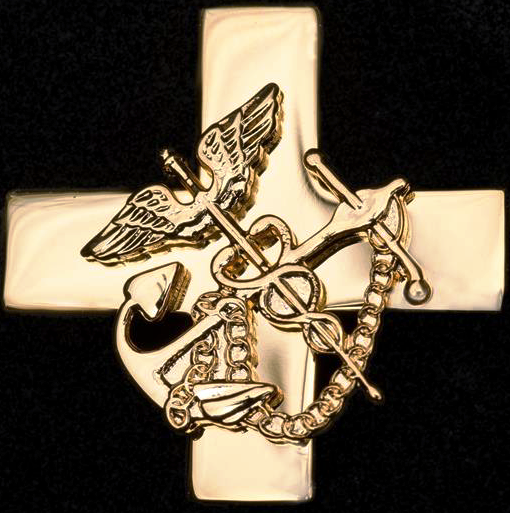
Field Medical Readiness Badge—recognizes officers who have exceeded force readiness standards while deployed

Commissioned Corps officers may wear two authorized special skills badges and two breast or identification badges on the Corps uniform. Badges of the USPHS take precedence over badges earned in other uniformed services.

- Assistant Secretary for Health / Principal Deputy Secretary for Health Officer-In-Charge Badge (ASHOIC)
- Surgeon General Badge (SG)
- Deputy Surgeon General Badge (DSG)
- Officer-in-Charge Badge (OIC)
- Chief Professional Officer Badge (CPO)
- Field Medical Readiness Badge (FMRB)
- Recruiter Badge
- Associate Recruiter (AR) Badge
- Public Health Service Music Ensemble Badge
- Department of Health and Human Services Identification (HHS ID) Badge
- Other badges and insignia issued by other uniformed services

== See also ==
- Awards and decorations of the United States government
- United States Public Health Service Commissioned Corps
- Uniformed services of the United States
- Awards and decorations of the National Oceanic and Atmospheric Administration
- Obsolete badges of the United States military
