= Commissioned Corps Training Ribbon =

Decoration of the U.S. Public Health Service

- Type: Training award
- Awarded for: Completion of the USPHS Commissioned Corps Officer Basic Course
- Country: United States
- Presented by: United States Public Health Service
- Eligibility: Members of the United States Public Health Service Commissioned Corps

Precedence
- Next (higher): Regular Corps Ribbon

The Commissioned Corps Training Ribbon is a decoration of the United States Public Health Service presented to members of the United States Public Health Service Commissioned Corps. It recognizes an officer's completion of the USPHS Commissioned Corps Officer Basic Course.

== Criteria ==
An officer is awarded the Commissioned Corps Training Ribbon upon his or her satisfactory completion of the Officer Basic Course.

Officers who successfully completed the former Basic Officer Training Course or Independent Officer Training Course also were awarded the ribbon. An officer who separates from the Commissioned Corps after completing one of those courses, returns to the Commissioned Corps, and then successfully completes the Officer Basic Course qualifies for a second award of the ribbon, but is not authorized to wear a device on the ribbon indicating a second award.

== See also ==
- Awards and decorations of the Public Health Service
- Awards and decorations of the United States government
