= AMSUS =

US professional association

AMSUS, The Society of Federal Health Professionals
- Abbreviation: AMSUS
- Formation: 1891; Chartered by Congress 1903
- Location: 12154 Darnestown Rd #506, Gaithersburg, MD 20878
- Members: ~5,000
- Executive Director/CEO: BG John M. Cho, MC, USA (Retired)
- Deputy Executive Director/COO: COL Ken Canestrini, MS, USA (Retired)
- Website: http://www.amsus.org

AMSUS, The Society of Federal Health Professionals, is a non-profit 501(c)(3) professional association for all U.S. federal health professionals serving in the Department of Defense, Department of Veterans Affairs, Department of Health and Human Services, and Department of Homeland Security. It was originally known as the Association of Military Surgeons of the United States. The name was changed to reflect that membership is open to all federal health professionals: physicians, physician assistants, nurses, nurse practitioners, pharmacists, psychologists, dentists, optometrists, social workers, other allied healthcare professionals, and healthcare executives.

== Purpose ==
Organized in 1891, and granted a congressional charter in 1903, the act of congress establishing the AMSUS stated that its purpose was:

...advancing the knowledge of military surgery, medicine, and sanitation in the medical departments of the Army, the Navy, and the Marine-Hospital Service of the United States and of the militia of the different states, and to increase the efficiency of the different services by mutual association and the consideration of matters pertaining to the medico-military service of the United States in peace and in war.

This original foundation is still the basis of the AMSUS mission to advance the knowledge of military healthcare and increase the efficiency and effectiveness of its members through organizational association and by providing a forum to consider matters of importance to its membership in times of peace and war. Today, AMSUS continues to fulfill its original mission with an ongoing commitment to:

- Provide a forum for interagency collaboration, knowledge-sharing, and cooperative problem-solving aimed at improving patient outcomes and advancing military health, Veterans health, public health, and global health.
- Publish Military Medicine, The International Journal of AMSUS, a peer-reviewed journal focused on military health, Veterans health, public health, and global health issues.
- Support federal health professionals with continuing medical education/continuing education opportunities.
- Create professional development opportunities federal health professionals may use to advance their careers.

== Military Medicine ==
Military Medicine is the international journal of AMSUS. Established in 1892 as The Military Surgeon, it is a bi-monthly peer-reviewed medical journal covering research and developments in the field military health, Veterans health, public health, and global health. The journal publishes research reports, case reports, editorials, letters to the editor, and book reviews.

== See also ==
- Commissioned Officers Association of the U.S. Public Health Service
