= Surgeon General's Exemplary Service Medal =

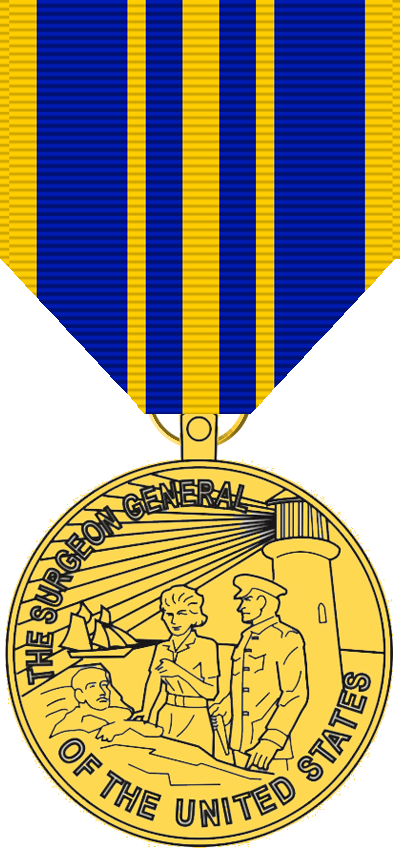
- Surgeon General's Exemplary Service Medal
- Type: Medal and ribbon
- Awarded for: Exemplary contributions to initiatives of the Surgeon General
- Presented by: the Surgeon General of the United States
- Eligibility: Members of the Uniformed Services of the United States
- Ribbon

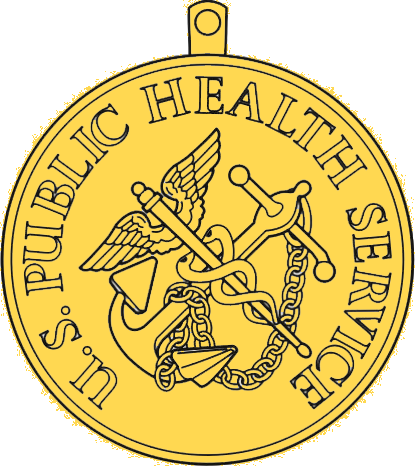
- Reverse
- Status: Current

Precedence
- Next (higher): Surgeon General's Medallion
- Next (lower): Public Health Service Outstanding Service Medal

The Surgeon General's Exemplary Service Medal is an award of the US Public Health Service. Administered by the Office of the Surgeon General, the medal is awarded at the sole discretion of the Surgeon General of the United States.

== Criteria ==
The Surgeon General's Exemplary Service Medal is awarded for exemplary contributions the initiatives of the Surgeon General by members of the Uniformed Services of the United States. This award is administered by the Office of the Surgeon General. Unlike most awards, there are no specific nomination criteria or procedures since the medal is awarded at the sole discretion of the Surgeon General.
