= Public Health Service Regular Corps Ribbon =

Decoration of the U.S. Public Health Service

- Type: Service award
- Awarded for: Membership in the Regular Corps of the USPHS Commissioned Corps
- Country: United States
- Presented by: United States Public Health Service
- Eligibility: Members of the United States Public Health Service Commissioned Corps

Precedence
- Next (higher): Bicentennial Unit Commendation Award
- Next (lower): Commissioned Corps Training Ribbon

The Public Health Service Regular Corps Ribbon is a decoration of the United States Public Health Service presented to members of the United States Public Health Service Commissioned Corps. It recognizes membership in the Regular Corps of the USPHS Commissioned Corps.

== Background ==
On 23 March 2010, the Reserve Corps of the USPHS Commissioned Corps was abolished and all of its officers became members of the Regular Corps of the USPHS Commissioned Corps as of that date. The Ready Reserve Corps of the USPHS Commissioned Corps was created on the same date, replacing the Reserve Corps.

== Criteria ==
The PHS Regular Corps Ribbon recognizes an officer's membership in the Regular Corps. An officer is awarded the Regular Corps Ribbon if he or she:

- was assimilated into the Regular Corps prior to 23 March 2010; or
- was on active duty on 23 March 2010; or
- is a Regular Corps officer called to active duty after 23 March 2010 who has successfully completed the USPHS Commissioned Corps Officer Basic Course.

== See also ==
- Awards and decorations of the Public Health Service
- Awards and decorations of the United States government
