= Public Health Service Outstanding Service Medal =

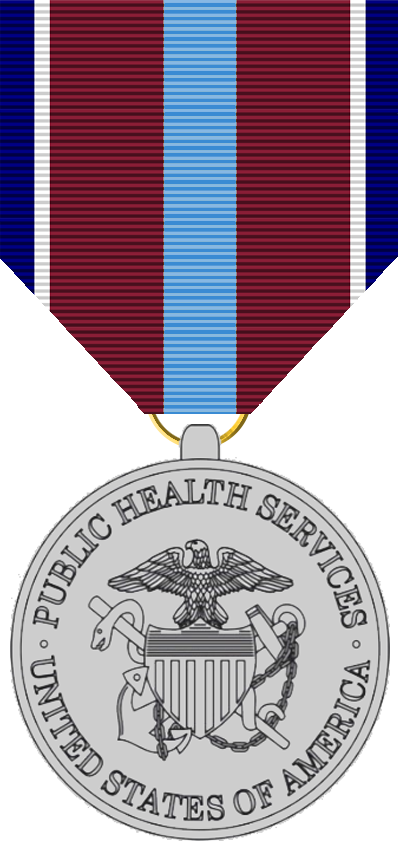
- Obverse of the PHS Outstanding Service Medal
- Type: Honor award (medal and ribbon)
- Awarded for: Demonstrating continuous outstanding leadership that has had a major effect on the health of the Nation
- Country: United States
- Presented by: the United States Public Health Service
- Eligibility: Members of the United States Public Health Service Commissioned Corps and members of any other Uniformed Service of the United States
- Status: Currently awarded
- Service ribbon of the medal

Precedence
- Next (higher): Air Medal
- Next (lower): NOAA Administrator's Award

The Public Health Service Outstanding Service Medal is a decoration of the United States Public Health Service presented to members of the United States Public Health Service Commissioned Officer Corps and to members of any Uniformed Services of the United States whose accomplishments or achievements are of outstanding or unique significance to the missions of the Corps. It is the seventh-highest award awarded by the United States Public Health Service Commissioned Corps.

== Criteria ==
The PHS Outstanding Service Medal is awarded to an officer who has demonstrated continuous outstanding leadership that has had a major effect on the health of the Nation, or has performed a heroic act resulting in the preservation of life or health.

The PHS Outstanding Service Medal may also be awarded "With Valor", signified by a bronze "V" for recognizing acts of courage and bravery. The designation “With Valor” is not to be used to recognize hazardous assignments or exposure to dangerous and life threatening environments. The officer must exhibit a positive and particular act, or actions, of bravery and courage, and/or heroism, resulting in the saving or preserving of the life or health of others. The degrees of risk to personal safety, the level of bravery, and the demonstration of courage, are determining factors that must be clearly displayed.

== See also ==
- Public Health Service Distinguished Service Medal
- Public Health Service Meritorious Service Medal
- Public Health Service Achievement Medal
