= Public Health Service Distinguished Service Medal =

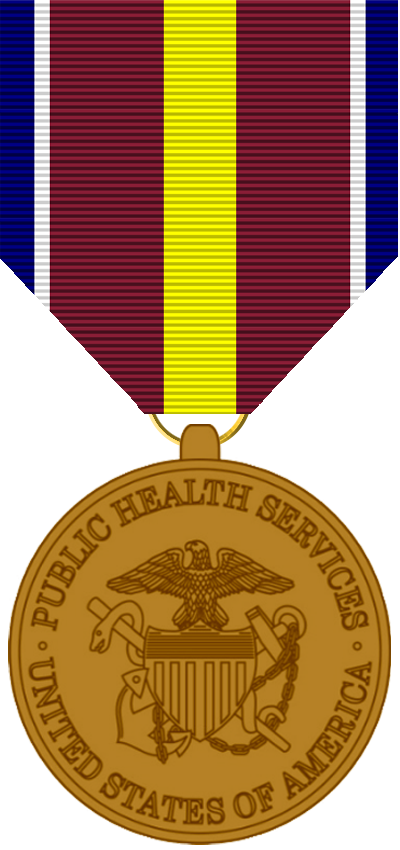
- Type: Military medal Distinguished service medal
- Awarded for: Exceedingly high levels of achievement.
- Country: United States
- Presented by: the United States Public Health Service
- Eligibility: Members of the United States Public Health Service Commissioned Corps and members of any other Uniformed Service of the United States
- Status: Currently awarded
- Established: c. 1900
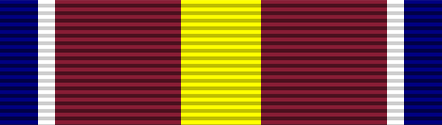
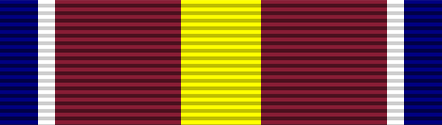
- Ribbon of PHS Distinguished Service Medal Ribbon of medal awarded for valor

Precedence
- Next (higher): Defense Distinguished Service Medal
- Next (lower): Homeland Security Distinguished Service Medal
- Related: Distinguished Service Medal

The Public Health Service Distinguished Service Medal is an honor award presented to members of the United States Public Health Service Commissioned Corps and to members of any Uniformed Services of the United States whose accomplishments or achievements are of outstanding or unique significance to the missions of the corps. This is the highest award presented by the United States Public Health Service. It is the highest decoration of the United States Department of Health and Human Services Public Health Service Commissioned Corps.

== Criteria ==
The PHS Distinguished Service Medal is awarded in recognition on an exceedingly high level of achievement by an officer who possesses a genuine sense of public service and who has made exceptional contributions to the mission of the Corps. Such achievement must result in a major impact on Global and/or National health. The award can also be conferred for an act of heroism resulting in the saving of life or the protection of health.

The PHS Distinguished Service Medal may also be awarded "With Valor", signified by a bronze "V" for recognizing acts of courage and bravery. The designation “With Valor” is not to be used to recognize hazardous assignments or exposure to dangerous and life-threatening environments. The officer must exhibit a positive and particular act, or actions, of bravery and courage, and/or heroism, resulting in the saving or preserving of the life or health of others. The degrees of risk to personal safety, the level of bravery, and the demonstration of courage, are determining factors that must be clearly displayed.

== See also ==
- Awards and decorations of the Public Health Service
