= Commissioned Officers Association of the U.S. Public Health Service =

Professional organization of the U.S. Public Health Service Commissioned Corps

- Logo
- Abbreviation: COA
- Formation: 1951; 75 years ago
- Type: Professional organization
- Headquarters: Landover, Maryland
- Region served: United States
- Members: 5,000
- Executive Director: Jacqueline Rychnovsky
- Board of directors: 22 elected/voting members 1 non-voting member
- Website: coausphs.org

The Commissioned Officers Association of the U.S. Public Health Service, often referred to as the Commissioned Officers Association (COA), is a professional association of officers of the United States Public Health Service (USPHS) Commissioned Corps. It is a nonprofit organization that advocates for the interests of the USPHS Commissioned Corps. COA describes itself as a "nationally recognized member-based organization" formed to "protect and enhance the public health and safety of the United States by supporting and advancing the interests of the Commissioned Corps and its officers." It describes itself as the only organization "that works exclusively on behalf of active, inactive, and retired" USPHS Commissioned Corps officers.

COA describes itself as serving as "a legislative aid, a media consultant, and a career development specialist to its members" which provides "representation and advocacy, education and training for health professionals, collaboration with related organizations, and dissemination of public and professional information."

== History ==
In the 1920s, small groups of USPHS Commissioned Corps officers began to hold informal meetings to discuss issues of importance to public health in general or to the U.S. Public Health Service. The meetings eventually led to the formal establishment of the Commissioned Officers Association in 1951 to advocate for their interests of USPHS Commissioned Corps officers though leadership, education, and communication.

In the mid-1960s, the association took action to oppose a proposal to close USPHS hospitals and outpatient clinics, contacting members of the United States Congress and its committees to express opposition to the proposal. Ultimately, the hospitals were closed during the 1980s.

In the 1970s, a strong movement began to abolish the USPHS Commissioned Corps. COA secured the support of members of Congress, the United States Secretary of Health, Education and Welfare, and the Surgeon General of the United States and succeeded in blocking any move to abolish the Commissioned Corps.

In June 2000, the USPHS Commissioned Officers Foundation for the Advancement of Public Health (COF), a sister organization of COA, was established as a not-for-profit organization to serve the education and research needs of COA.

In 2002, COA worked through the Military Coalition to lead an effort to defeat a proposal by the George W. Bush Administration to classify USPHS Commissioned Corps officers as civil servants for purposes of compensation.

== Organization ==
COA is governed by a board of directors. The board consists of the executive director of COA in a non-voting, ex officio capacity and 22 elected, voting members. The executive director and four of the elected, voting members (the chair, the chair-elect, the treasurer, and the past chair) make up the board's executive committee. The rest of the elected voting members include one active-duty USPHS Commissioned Corps officer from each of the 11 USPHS categories (Dental, Dietitian, Engineer, Environmental Health, Health Services, Medical, Nurse, Pharmacist, Scientist, Therapist, and Veterinarian), three field representatives, an officer of the USPHS Commissioned Corps Ready Reserve, and three retired USPHS Commissioned Corps officers. The board of directors approves changes to COA's bylaws (subject to final approval by COA's membership) and significant policies of COA.

Membership in COA is open to active regular, active reserve, reserve, retired, and former officers of the USPHS Commissioned Corps. In 2011, COA had about 5,000 members, six full-time employees, and an operating budget of about US$1,800,000. It is headquartered in Landover, Maryland, and maintains over 70 local branches throughout the United States and overseas.

In June 2025, the COA reported total revenue of $999,768 and total assets of $1,703,320.

== Advocacy ==
COA addresses issues which it deems of importance to the future of the USPHS Commissioned Corps. It describes one of its top priorities as working with the Reserve Officers Association, the Military Officers Association of America, and the Association of Military Surgeons of the United States to ensure that USPHS Commissioned Corps officers maintain parity with officers of the other seven uniformed services of the United States. It also describes itself as a proponent for a major transformation of the USPHS Commissioned Corps to better position it to meet new public health challenges in the 21st century. COA is an active member of The Military Coalition, which in 2020 described itself as " a group of 35 military, veterans, and uniformed services organizations in joint pursuit" of a number of common goals.

COA was part of the organizations that supported the 14 April 2016, rally on Capitol Hill which was organized by the Iraq and Afghanistan Veterans of America against the proposed reduction of transferred Post-9/11 GI Bill benefits.

In June 2017, COA objected the nomination of Jerome Adams as surgeon general by President Donald Trump, since he was selected from outside of the USPHS Commissioned Corps and therefore did not abide by the law passed in 1944.

In 2018, COA executive director James Currie raised concerns about the Department of Veterans Affairs online application for veteran identification cards which excluded former USPHS and NOAA commissioned officers. In April 2018, the corrections to the applications dropdown menu were completed to include both corps in the listing of military services.

During COVID-19 in 2020, COA helped advance a provision in the federal continued resolution (CR) which allowed USPHS commissioned officers to accumulate more than 60 days of leave to be used by September 2023.

In 2022, COA engaged with North Carolina legislators with support from MOAA representatives, which resulted in a bill being signed on 11 July by Governor Roy Copper exempting state income-tax on all retirement benefits from the USPHS and the NOAA commissioned corps.

COA endorsed the Uniformed Services Leave Parity Act, which was introduced on 10 April 2025, as S. 1440 and H.R. 2846, and expanded parental, emergency, and other leave benefits for USPHS commissioned officers. On 31 July 2025, the Senate bill went through the Senate Health, Education, Labor, and Pensions Committee.

In May 2026, COA endorsed the Pensions for Retired Uniformed Servicemembers Act (H.R. 8732) and signed the coalition letter seeking its inclusion in the fiscal year 2027 National Defense Authorization Act on 11 June 2026.

== COA Ribbon ==
Commissioned Officers Association Ribbon

USPHS Commissioned Corps officers receive the COA Ribbon when they join COA. The USPHS Commissioned Corps authorizes COA members in good standing to wear the ribbon when attending a COA function.

== See also ==
- Association of Military Surgeons of the United States
- Military Officers Association of America
- Reserve Officers Association
- Awards and decorations of the Public Health Service
