= Public Health Service Commendation Medal =

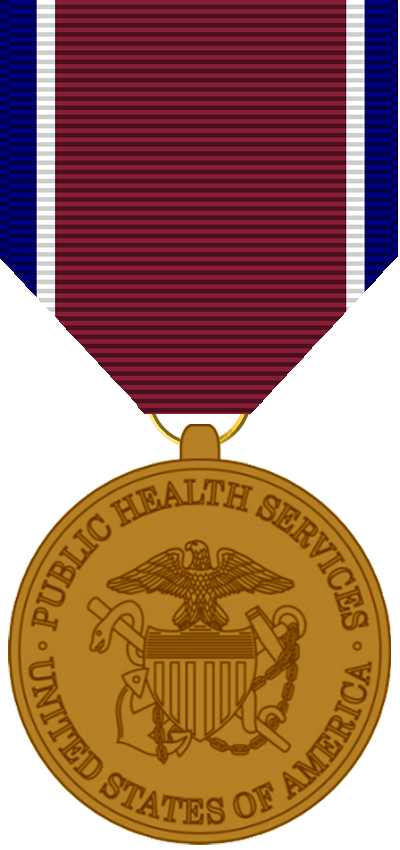
- Obverse of the PHS Commendation Medal
- Type: Honor award (medal and ribbon)
- Awarded for: Exhibiting a level of proficiency and dedication distinctly greater than that expected of an officer
- Country: United States
- Presented by: United States Public Health Service
- Eligibility: Members of the United States Public Health Service Commissioned Corps and members of any other Uniformed Service of the United States
- Status: Currently awarded
- Service ribbon of the medal

Precedence
- Next (higher): Aerial Achievement Medal
- Next (lower): Joint Service Commendation Medal

The Public Health Service Commendation Medal is a decoration of the United States Public Health Service presented to members of the United States Public Health Service Commissioned Officer Corps and to members of any Uniformed Services of the United States who has exhibited a level of proficiency and dedication distinctly greater than that expected of an officer. It is the eight-highest award awarded by the United States Public Health Service Commissioned Corps.

== Criteria ==
The PHS Commendation Medal is awarded to an officer who has exhibited a level of proficiency and dedication distinctly greater than that expected of an officer. The award recognized sustained high quality achievements in scientific, managerial, or other professional fields; application of unique skill or creative imagination to the approach or solution of problems; or noteworthy technical and professional contributions that are significant to a limited area.

== See also ==
- Public Health Service Distinguished Service Medal
- Public Health Service Meritorious Service Medal
- Public Health Service Achievement Medal
