= Public Health Service Bicentennial Unit Commendation Award =

Decoration of the U.S. Public Health Service

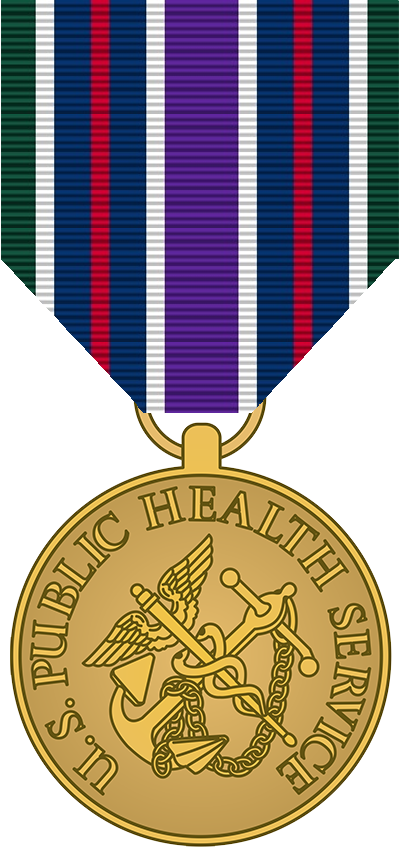
- Type: Service award
- Awarded for: Service during the bicentennial of the U.S. Public Health Service
- Country: United States
- Presented by: United States Public Health Service
- Eligibility: Members of the United States Public Health Service Commissioned Corps
- Ribbon

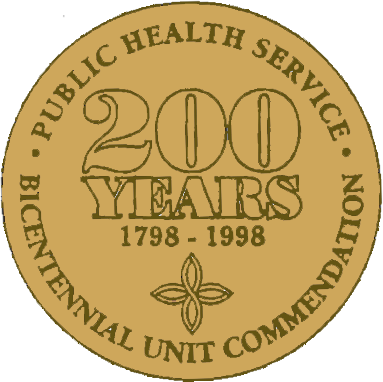
- Reverse

Precedence
- Next (higher): Global Health Initiative Service Medal
- Next (lower): Regular Corps Ribbon

The Public Health Service Bicentennial Unit Commendation Award is a decoration of the United States Public Health Service presented to members of the United States Public Health Service Commissioned Corps. It recognizes service during the bicentennial of the U.S. Public Health Service.

== Criteria ==
The PHS Bicentennial Unit Commendation Award recognizes service during the bicentennial of the founding of the U.S. Public Health Service, which the service traces to the creation of the United States Marine Hospital Service in 1798. Any USPHS Commissioned Corps officer who served satisfactorily on active duty for any period between 1 January 1998 and 16 July 1999 qualifies for the award.

== See also ==
- Awards and decorations of the Public Health Service
- Awards and decorations of the United States government
