= Public Health Service Achievement Medal =

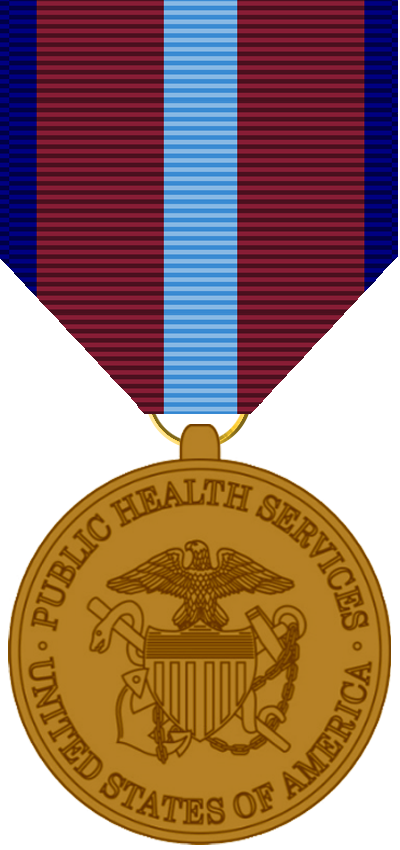
- Public Health Service Achievement Medal
- Type: Honor award (medal and ribbon)
- Awarded for: Superior efforts or outcomes in accomplishing a program’s mission
- Country: United States
- Presented by: the United States Public Health Service
- Eligibility: Members of the United States Public Health Service Commissioned Corps and members of any other Uniformed Service of the United States
- Status: Currently awarded
- Ribbon of PHS Achievement Medal

Precedence
- Next (higher): Department of Transportation Superior Achievement Medal
- Next (lower): Joint Service Achievement Medal
- Related: Achievement Medal (Other Services)

The Public Health Achievement Medal is a decoration of the United States Public Health Service presented to members of the United States Public Health Service Commissioned Officer Corps and to members of any Uniformed Services of the United States whose accomplishments or achievements are of outstanding or unique significance to the missions of the Corps. It is the ninth-highest award awarded by the United States Public Health Service Commissioned Corps.

== Criteria ==
The PHS Achievement Medal is awarded to an officer for superior efforts or outcomes in accomplishing a program's mission. This could include recognition of the advancement of program objectives, sustained above-average accomplishments, or superior dedication to duty over a relatively short period of time.

== See also ==
- Awards and decorations of the Public Health Service
- Awards and decorations of the United States government
