= Public Health Service Meritorious Service Medal =

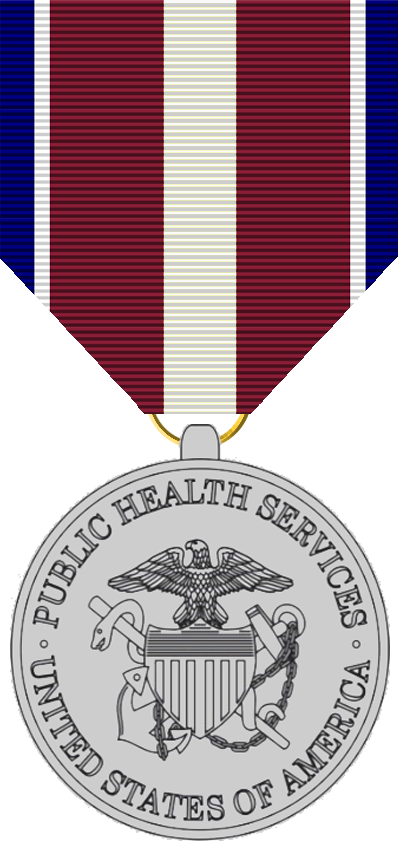
- Type: Honor award (medal and ribbon)
- Awarded for: Meritorious service
- Country: United States
- Presented by: the United States Public Health Service
- Eligibility: Members of the United States Public Health Service Commissioned Corps and members of any other Uniformed Service of the United States
- Status: Currently awarded
- Service ribbon of the medal

Precedence
- Next (higher): Purple Heart
- Next (lower): Defense Meritorious Service Medal
- Related: Meritorious Service Medal

The Public Health Service Meritorious Service Medal is an honor award presented to members of the United States Public Health Service Commissioned Officer Corps and to members of any Uniformed Services of the United States whose accomplishments or achievements are of outstanding or unique significance to the missions of the Corps. It is the second highest award presented by the United States Public Health Service.

== Criteria ==
The PHS Meritorious Service Medal is awarded in recognition of meritorious service of a single, particularly important achievement; a career notable for significant accomplishments in technical or professional fields; or unusually high quality and initiative in leadership. The levels of accomplishment meriting this award may include a highly significant achievement in research, program direction, or program administration; a series of significant contributions; a continuing period of meritorious service; or an exhibition of great courage and heroics in an emergency.

The PHS Meritorious Service Medall may also be awarded "with valor", signified by a bronze "V" for recognizing acts of courage and bravery. The designation "with valor" is not to be used to recognize hazardous assignments or exposure to dangerous and life-threatening environments. The officer must exhibit a positive and particular act, or actions, of bravery and courage, and/or heroism, resulting in the saving or preserving of the life or health of others. The degrees of risk to personal safety, the level of bravery, and the demonstration of courage, are determining factors that must be clearly displayed.
