= C. Everett Koop =

American pediatric surgeon and public health administrator (1916–2013)

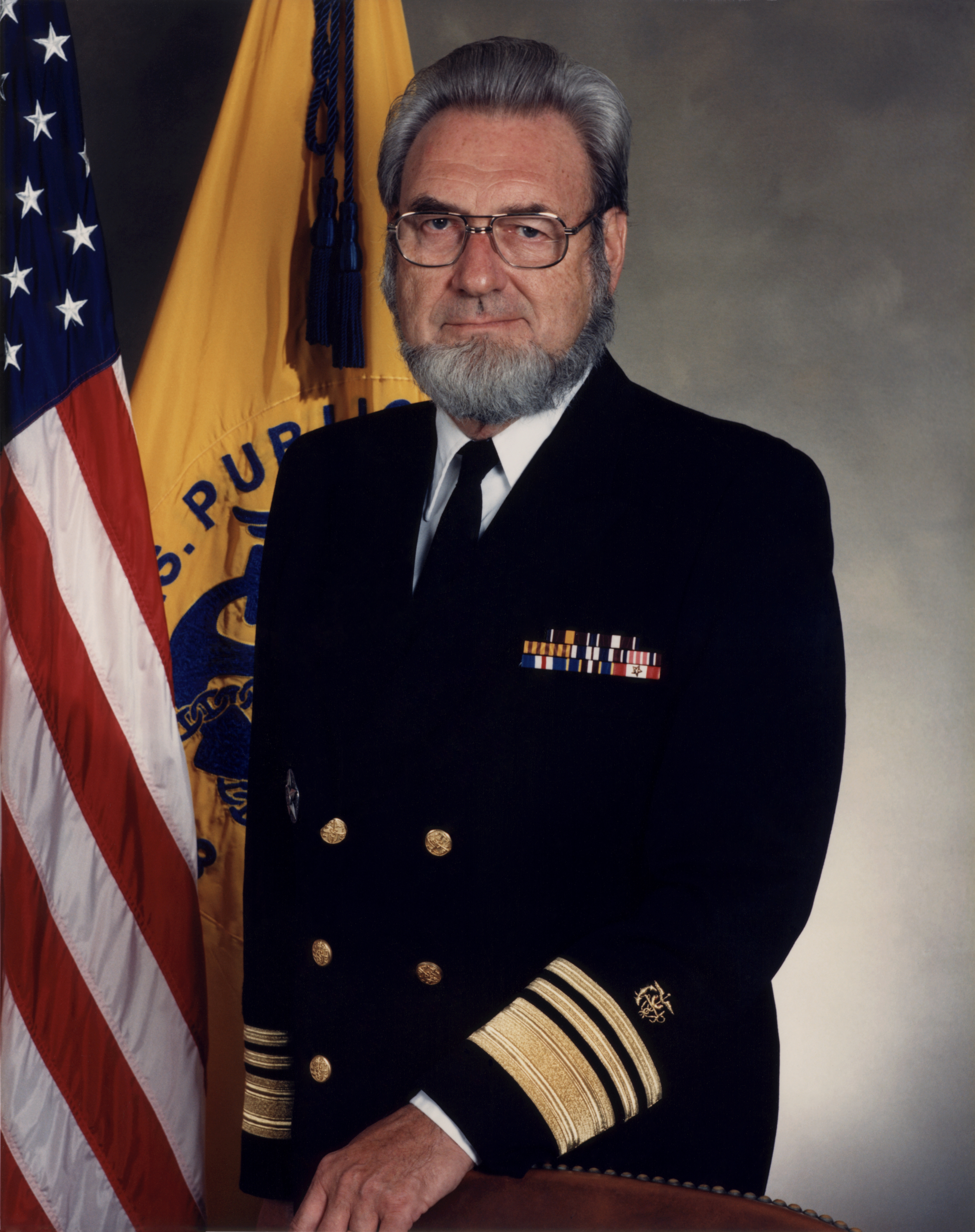
- Official portrait, 1980s

13th Surgeon General of the United States
- In office January 21, 1982 – October 1, 1989
- President: Ronald Reagan; George H. W. Bush
- Preceded by: Julius B. Richmond
- Succeeded by: Antonia Novello

Personal details
- Born: Charles Everett Koop; October 14, 1916 New York City, U.S.
- Died: February 25, 2013 (aged 96) Hanover, New Hampshire, U.S.
- Party: Republican
- Spouses: Elizabeth Flanagan (m. 1938; died 2007) Cora Hogue (m. 2010)
- Children: 4
- Education: Dartmouth College (AB); Cornell University (MD); University of Pennsylvania (DSc)

Charles Everett Koop (October 14, 1916 – February 25, 2013) was an American pediatric surgeon and public health administrator who served as the 13th surgeon general of the United States under President Ronald Reagan from 1982 to 1989. According to the Associated Press, "Koop was the only surgeon general to become a household name" due to his frequent public presence around the HIV/AIDS crisis of the 1980s.

Koop was known for his work on tobacco use, AIDS, and abortion, and for his support of the rights of children with disabilities.

== Early life and education ==
Koop was born in Brooklyn, New York, the only child of John Everett Koop (1883–1972), a banker and descendant of 17th-century Dutch settlers, and Helen (née Apel) Koop (1894–1970). He attended and graduated from Flatbush School. In 1937, he earned his Bachelor of Arts in zoology degree from Dartmouth College, where he was given the nickname "Chick" (occasionally used for his first name, Charles, but here an allusion to a chicken coop). His interest in medicine followed after a year spent in the hospital after a childhood skiing accident and brain hemorrhage. He earned his MD degree from Cornell Medical College in 1941 and Doctor of Science degree in medicine from the University of Pennsylvania in 1947.

== Medical career ==
From 1946 to 1981, Koop was the surgeon-in-chief at the Children's Hospital of Philadelphia (CHOP). Koop was able to establish the nation's first neonatal surgical intensive care unit there in 1956. He helped establish the biliary atresia program at CHOP when Japanese surgeon Morio Kasai came to work with him in the 1970s. He also established the pediatric surgery fellowship training program at CHOP. During his tenure there he graduated 35 residents and 14 foreign fellows, many of whom went on to become professors of pediatric surgery, directors of divisions of pediatric surgery, and surgeons-in-chief of children's hospitals.

Koop became a professor of pediatric surgery in 1959 and professor of pediatrics in 1971 at the University of Pennsylvania School of Medicine.

While a surgeon in Philadelphia, Koop performed groundbreaking surgical procedures on conjoined twins, invented techniques which today are commonly used for infant surgery, and saved the lives of countless children who otherwise might have been allowed to die. He invented anesthetic and surgical techniques for small bodies and metabolisms and participated in the separation of several sets of conjoined twins whose condition other physicians at the time considered hopeless. He first gained international recognition in 1957 by the separation of two female pygopagus infants (conjoined at the pelvis) and then, again, in 1974 by the separation of two ischiopagus twins (conjoined at the spine) sharing a liver, colon, and parts of the intestines with their entire trunks merged.

Koop was active in publishing articles in the medical literature. Koop later wrote that:

Each day of those early years in pediatric surgery I felt I was on the cutting edge. Some of the surgical problems that landed on the operating table at Children's had not even been named. Many of the operations I performed had never been done before. It was an exuberant feeling, but also a little scary. At times I was troubled by fears that I wasn't doing things the right way, that I would have regrets, or that someone else had performed a certain procedure successfully but had never bothered to write it up for the medical journals, or if they had I couldn't find it.

Koop helped rectify this by publishing his own findings and results. Additionally, he became the first editor of the Journal of Pediatric Surgery when it was founded in 1966.

In contrast to his years as surgeon general, when it was his policies and speeches that had bearing on other people, his years as an operating pediatric surgeon involved a more individualized, direct, hands-on effect on others. During the course of his long career, for example, he performed some seventeen thousand inguinal hernia repairs and over seven thousand orchidopexies (surgery for correcting undescended testicle). He developed new procedures, such as the colon interposition graft for correcting esophageal atresia (congenital lack of continuity of the esophagus) or ventriculoperitoneal shunts for treatment of hydrocephalus (accumulation of excessive cerebral spinal fluid in and around the brain causing neurological problems). He also tackled many difficult cases ranging from childhood cancer to surgeries done on conjoined twins, of which he and his colleagues operated upon ten pairs during his 35-year tenure. In all he operated on many children and babies with congenital defects 'incompatible with life but amenable to surgical correction'.

In 1976, Koop wrote The Right to Live, The Right to Die, setting down his strong opposition to abortion and euthanasia. Koop also took some time off from his surgical practice to make a series of films with conservative Christian Frank Schaeffer and his father Francis Schaeffer in 1978, entitled Whatever Happened to the Human Race? based on the book of the same title that was previously written by the elder Schaeffer. Frank Schaeffer and his associate, Jim Buchfuehrer provided a private, five hour screening to U.S. Rep. Jack Kemp and wife Joanne on their home that, according to Frank Schaeffer's account of the late evening and early morning event in his book Crazy for God, led to both the Schaeffers and Koop obtaining "...access to everyone in the Republican Party".

President Ronald Reagan, shortly after his first inauguration, appointed Koop Deputy Assistant Secretary for Health in February 1981. It was understood that Reagan would later nominate Koop to be surgeon general.

== Surgeon General of the United States ==
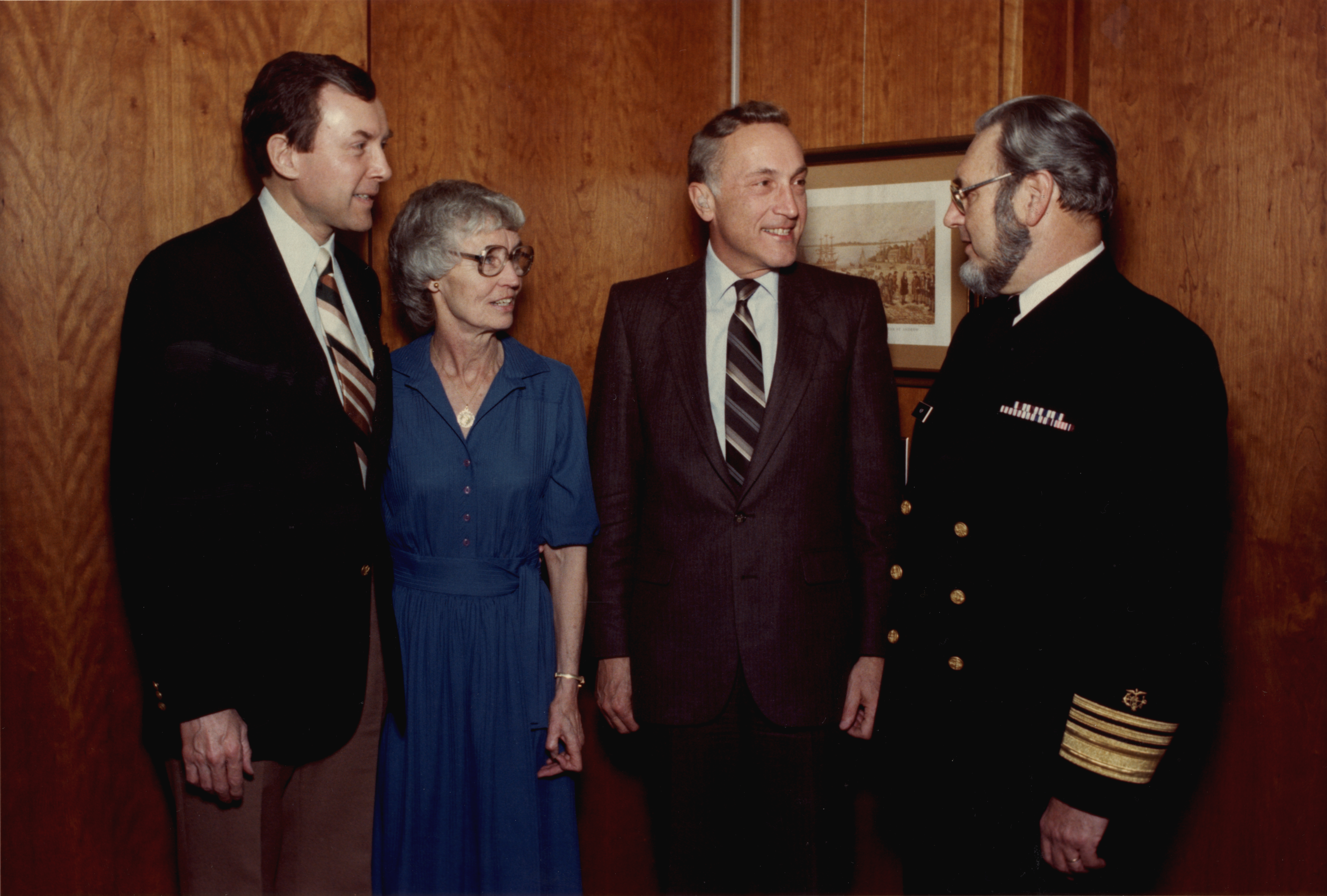
Koop with his wife, Betty, Senator Orrin Hatch of Utah, and Secretary of Health and Human Services Richard Schweiker.

As expected, Koop was nominated to be Surgeon General of the United States by Reagan later in 1981. Many liberal politicians and women's groups opposed the nomination because of Koop's very conservative views and strong anti-abortion beliefs. His nomination was confirmed by the United States Senate on November 16, 1981, by a vote of 60–24. He was sworn into office on January 21 the following year.

=== Abortion ===
Although Koop was against abortion on personal and religious grounds, he declined to state that abortion procedures performed by qualified medical professionals posed a substantial health risk to the women whose pregnancies were being terminated, despite political pressure to endorse such a position.

==== Koop Report ====
Koop, an opponent of abortion, resisted pressure from the Reagan administration in 1987 to prepare a report stating that abortion was psychologically harmful to women. He said it was not a public health issue but a moral one. Koop assigned an assistant, George Walter, the task of researching the matter. Walter obtained a list of articles from the Centers for Disease Control and Prevention (CDC), authored mainly by CDC abortion-surveillance staff, and consulted with Alan Guttmacher Institute personnel. Walter wrote a draft report on his findings and gave it to Koop.

In a January 10, 1989, letter to Reagan, Koop said there was insufficient evidence to substantiate issuing the finding desired by the administration. He also commented about how some of the president's advisers thought that "it was a foregone conclusion that the negative health effects of abortion on women were so overwhelming that the evidence would force the reversal of Roe v. Wade".

Koop did not present the draft report to Reagan and claimed he never approved it. In March 1989, the "Koop Report" became public after it was subpoenaed and became part of a Congressional subcommittee hearing. Although there were allegations that the report had not been released previously because it was biased, the document contained all arguments on both sides of the issue. Koop himself said at the hearing, "My position [on abortion] is well known to everybody in this country. I'm opposed to it. But I also took an oath to uphold the law of the land. That's why I walk a tightrope and why I prepared the report as I did."

=== Tobacco ===
In his 1988 Report of the Surgeon General, it was reported that nicotine has an addictiveness similar to that of heroin or cocaine. Koop's report was somewhat unexpected, especially by those who expected him to maintain the status quo in regard to his office's position on tobacco products.

"He railed against their advertising approaches, their marketing to children, their bogus research operation, their unwillingness to come clean on nicotine addiction. He said their product was more addictive than heroin. He called their leadership "morally corrupt". He informed the public about the dangers of second hand smoke, smoking while pregnant, and smoking in public places, including hospitals. He was relentlessly provocative, and used tobacco to test his theories about hands-on, public health campaigning."

During his tenure, in 1984, Congress passed legislation providing new, rotated health warning labels on cigarette packs and required advertising to include the labels. Those labels remain unchanged today. The FDA announced new labels containing graphic depictions of smoking-caused illness and death, but they were put on hold pending the outcome of the tobacco industry's legal challenges. Koop challenged Americans in 1984 to "create a smoke-free society in the United States by the year 2000." As Surgeon General, he released eight reports on the health consequences of tobacco use, including the first report on the health consequences of involuntary tobacco smoke exposure. During Koop's tenure as Surgeon General, smoking rates in the United States declined significantly from 38% to 27%.

=== AIDS ===
Koop was Surgeon General when public health authorities first began to take notice of AIDS. For his first four years in office, Koop, the nation's top health officer, was prevented from addressing this health crisis for reasons he insisted were never apparent to him but that were no doubt political. Koop wrote the official U.S. policy on the disease, and in 1988 he took unprecedented action in mailing AIDS information to every U.S. household. Health advocates and organizations expressed dissatisfaction with the focus on same-sex activity and anal sexual intercourse as primary vectors for disease transmission. Surgeon General Koop maintained that these activities posed significantly higher risks than other transmission methods. In addition, some religious groups raised concerns about the pamphlet’s candid discussion of sexual practices and its promotion of condom use, leading to calls for Koop's resignation. Koop also infuriated some former supporters by advocating sex education in schools, possibly as early as the third grade, including later instruction regarding the proper use of condoms to combat the spread of AIDS. While a straightforward telling to the public about the disease was controversial, Koop was also criticized by some health activists who claimed that his office had not gone far enough to develop a cure or vaccine, reducing his office's role in educating the public on health concerns.

=== Disability ===
In April 1982, a child born in Bloomington, Indiana, was diagnosed with Down syndrome as well as esophageal atresia with tracheoesophageal fistula. Six days later, after court involvement and parental discussion involving disagreement among physicians about whether or not to treat the baby or let him die, the baby died, having been denied surgical treatment to correct his esophageal atresia and tracheoesophageal fistula. Baby Doe, as he would be known, became a symbol for newborns with congenital disabilities, children with disabilities, and the debate over infanticide. Koop was not initially involved with the Baby Doe case but had a special interest in it. As a pediatric surgeon in Philadelphia, he and his colleagues had operated on 475 such babies during his 35 years there, with ever-increasing survival rates. During his last eight years in active practice, Koop never lost a full-term baby upon whom he had operated to correct esophageal atresia. Due to this background, he became actively involved in championing policies to protect the rights of newborns with disabilities, which led to Congress passing the Baby Doe Amendment.

=== Style ===
These four issues, combined with Koop's personality and his willingness to make use of mass media, brought to the office of Surgeon General a higher public profile than it previously had; he is, for instance, the first Surgeon General to have been the subject of a popular song: "Promiscuous" by Frank Zappa. He was interviewed by Ali G for comedic effect.

Of his high-profile role, Koop said in a 1987 interview, "I am the surgeon general of the heterosexuals and the homosexuals, of the young and the old, of the moral or the immoral, the married and the unmarried. I don't have the luxury of deciding which side I want to be on. So I can tell you how to keep yourself alive no matter what you are. That's my job."

Koop was well known for his mustache-less beard and colorful bow ties. He was a vice admiral in the U.S. Public Health Service Commissioned Corps (U.S. PHSCC). During much of his day-to-day work, Koop wore the surgeon general's U.S. PHSCC uniform, a uniform similar to that of a vice admiral's in the U.S. Navy. During his tenure, he re-instated the daily wearing of the PHS uniform by the officers of the PHS.

== Later career ==
Following his career as Surgeon General, Koop was on The Firestorm Solutions Expert Council. Koop hosted a documentary television series on NBC simply titled C. Everett Koop, M.D. It aired for five episodes in June 1991, and explored health and healthcare issues of concern to Koop, with a special focus on children.

Koop and other investors established drkoop.com in 1997, during the dot-com bubble. This medical information website was one of the first major online sources of health information. Critical review of the site content revealed that many of the private care listings, medicinal recommendations, and medical trial referrals were paid advertisements. The company went bankrupt in 2001. Koop continued to endorse Life Alert bracelets for the elderly.

In 1999, while testifying before Congress, Koop minimized concerns from health groups about the severity of allergies relating to the use of latex gloves. It was later discovered that a company that manufactured latex gloves had previously paid Koop $650,000 for consulting work.

Koop held three professorships at Dartmouth Medical School, where he was also the senior scholar at the C. Everett Koop Institute.

== Personal life ==
In early 1968, Koop's son David was killed in a rock climbing accident on Cannon Mountain during his junior year at Dartmouth College. Koop later wrote that because of his son's death, he thought, "I might be better able to help parents of dying children, but for quite a while I felt less able, too emotionally involved. And from that time on, I could rarely discuss the death of a child without tears welling up into my eyes." Years later, he and his wife wrote a book called Sometimes Mountains Move to help others who had lost a child. Koop's other son, the Reverend Norman Koop, attended Eastern Baptist College (now Eastern University) and graduated in 1969. The following year, the elder Koop was elected to the board of trustees, becoming the first non-Baptist member of the board.

In February 2007, Elizabeth Koop, his wife of nearly 70 years, died. On April 17, 2010, at the age of 93, he married Cora Hogue, a former staff member of Tenth Presbyterian Church in Philadelphia.

== Death and legacy ==
At a November 2010 news conference, Koop spoke from a wheelchair and said that he was "very, very deaf" and legally blind. Koop died on February 25, 2013, at the age of 96 at his home in Hanover, New Hampshire. According to a Koop aide, he had been ill for several months and had suffered kidney failure the previous week.

Remarking on Koop's death, American Medical Association president Jeremy Lazarus commented, "Because of what he did, and the way he did it, he had a dramatic impact on public health." The Associated Press called his impact "great", while The Philadelphia Inquirer called him "a courageous and brilliant pediatric surgeon who pioneered techniques ... and became an outspoken surgeon general". Writing for The New Yorker, Michael Specter said, "I don't think I have ever met anyone for whom I had more respect... In this era, during which progress, facts, and science are under unrelenting siege, it is thrilling to remember that even ideologues can love the truth."

== In popular culture ==
- Koop had a cameo role, appearing as himself, in the 1990 film The Exorcist III.
- In The Simpsons season 5, episode 1, "Homer's Barbershop Quartet", Koop is mentioned in the episode as the subject of a song sung by Homer's group. The Simpsons season 12, episode 16 "Bye Bye Nerdie" features Koop as a member of the audience in the final scene, where Lisa demonstrates her findings about bullies.
- In Futurama season 4, episode 16, "Three Hundred Big Boys", a brand of cigars known as "Royal Kooparillo" shows the likeness of Koop. Koop's likeness appears again in season 8, episode 9, "Fry Am the Egg Man", as the head on Fry's Pez dispenser of heart attack medicine.
- In Seinfeld season 3, episode 18, "The Boyfriend", Part II, Jerry likens Elaine to C. Everett Koop, because she breaks up with Keith Hernandez for being a smoker.
- In King of the Hill season 1, episode 6, "Hank's Unmentionable Problem", Peggy watches an advertisement on TV featuring C. Everett Koop. Later she dreams of Hank's funeral, in which C. Everett Koop is giving the eulogy. In season 9, episode 3, "Death Buys a Timeshare", Cotton asks Bill who he thinks is uglier, Hank's wife or C. Everett Koop
- In Psych season 2, episode 7, "If You're So Smart, Then Why Are You Dead?", the Headmaster of a prestigious high school explains that Shawn and Gus beat out C. Everett Koop for the position of annual guest lecturer, in which they taught a class on paranormal studies. According to the Headmaster, "[Koop] was crushed he didn't get it."
- In The Golden Girls season 4, episode 15, “Valentine’s Day”
- In Da Ali G Show, interviewed by Sacha Baron Cohen's character Ali G.
- Frank Zappa parodied Koop's public persona in the song "Promiscuous" from his 1988 album Broadway the Hard Way.
- Koop was portrayed by Clancy Brown in the 2024 film Audrey's Children.

== Awards and honors ==
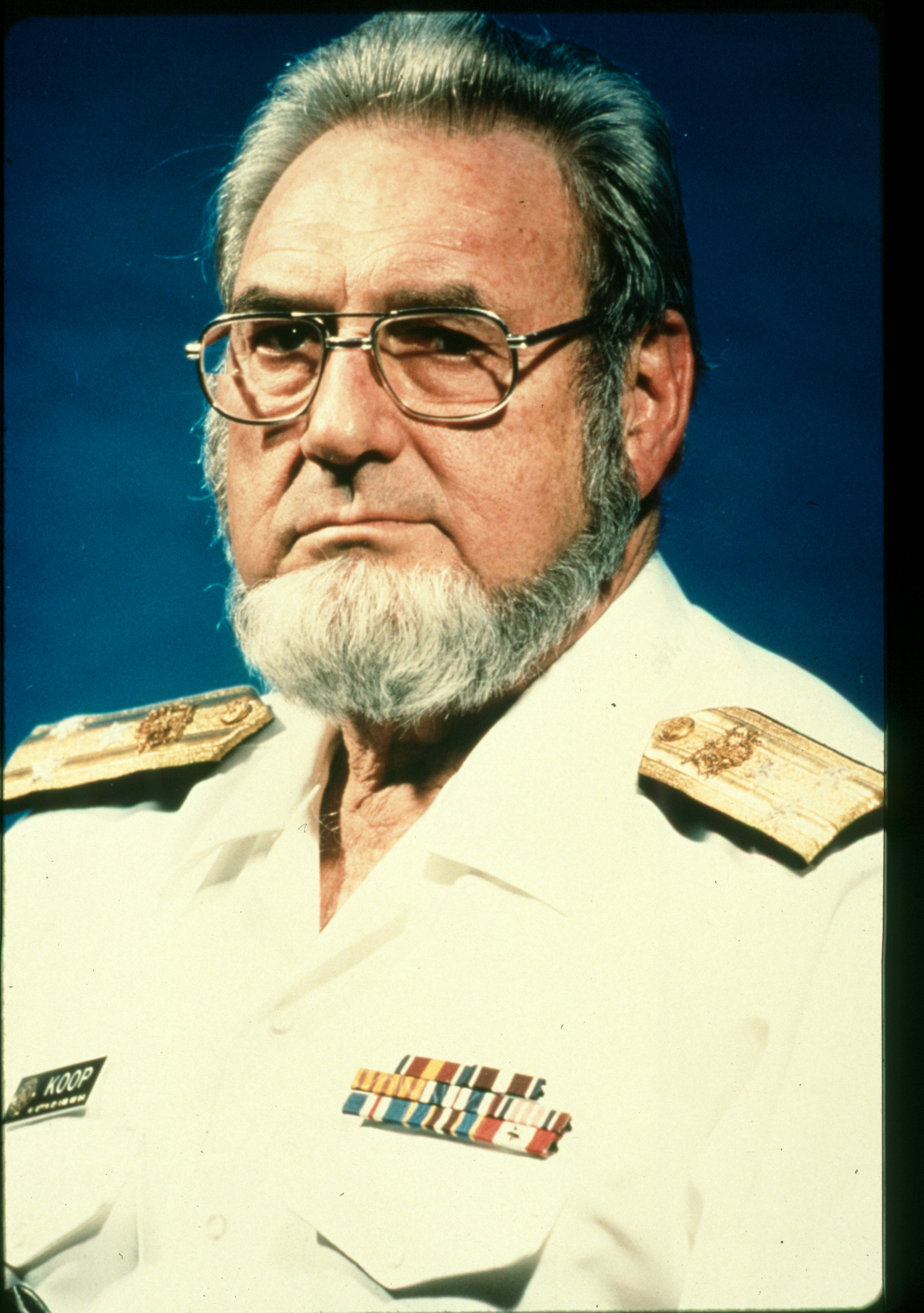
Koop in U.S. Public Health Service uniform

- Public Health Service Distinguished Service Medal
- Public Health Service Meritorious Service Medal
- Surgeon General's Medallion
- Surgeon General's Exemplary Service Medal
- Public Health Service Citation Medal
- Public Health Service Outstanding Unit Citation
- Presidential Medal of Freedom (1995)
- Public Health Service Foreign Duty Award
- Public Health Service Regular Corps Ribbon
- Légion d'Honneur (1980)
- Order of Merit of Duarte, Sánchez and Mella, the highest award of the Dominican Republic
- Association of Military Surgeons of the United States with gold star
- Denis Browne Gold Medal by the British Association of Paediatric Surgeons
- William E. Ladd Gold Medal of the American Academy of Pediatrics
- Fellow of the American College of Surgeons (FACS)
- Royal College of Surgeons of England (1982)
- Royal College of Physicians and Surgeons of Glasgow (1987)
- Royal Society of Medicine (1997)
- Honorary Fellowship of the Royal College of Surgeons of Edinburgh (HonFRCS) (2009)
- U.S. Senator John Heinz Award for Greatest Public Service by an Elected or Appointed Official (1988 Jefferson Award)
- Public Welfare Medal from the National Academy of Sciences (1990)
- Albert Schweitzer Prize for Humanitarianism (1991)
- Tyler Prize for Environmental Achievement (1991)
- Leopold Griffuel Prize (1989)
- Emmy Award in the News and Documentary category for "C. Everett Koop, MD," a five-part series on health care reform (1991)
- The 2nd Annual Heinz Award in Public Policy (1996)
- Member of the American Academy of Arts and Sciences (1990)
- Member of the American Philosophical Society (1992)

== Bibliography ==
- Bishop, Harry C.; Koop, C. Everett (1957). "Management of Meconium Ileus: Resection, Roux-en-Y Anastomosis and Ileostomy Irrigation with Pancreatic Enzymes". Annals of Surgery. 145 (3): 404–414. doi:10.1097/00000658-195703000-00017. PMC 1465484. PMID 13403593.
- Koop, C. Everett; Hamilton, James P. (1965). "Atresia of the Esophagus: Increased Survival with Staged Procedures in the Poor-risk Infant". Annals of Surgery. 162 (3): 389–401. doi:10.1097/00000658-196509000-00008. PMC 1476897. PMID 5829715.
- D'Angio, Giulio J.; Evans, Audrey E.; Koop, C. Everett (1971). "Special Pattern of Widespread Neuroblastoma with a Favourable Prognosis". The Lancet. 297 (7708): 1046–1049. doi:10.1016/S0140-6736(71)91606-0. PMID 4102970.
- Sometimes Mountains Move by C. Everett Koop and Elizabeth Koop. Tyndale, 1974. ISBN 0-8423-6064-6 (revised edition published by Zondervan in 1994, ISBN 0-310-48672-6)
- Visible & Palpable Lesions in Children by C. Everett Koop. Grune & Stratton, 1976. ISBN 0-8089-0958-4
- The Right to Live, the Right to Die by C. Everett Koop. Tyndale, 1976. ISBN 0-8423-5593-6
- Whatever Happened to the Human Race? by Francis A. Schaeffer and C. Everett Koop. F.H. Revell, 1979. ISBN 0-8007-1051-7 (revised edition published by Crossway Books in 1983, ISBN 0-89107-291-8)
- Koop: The Memoirs of America's Family Doctor by C. Everett Koop. Random House, 1991. ISBN 0-394-57626-8
- Koop, C. Everett; Lundberg, George D. (1992). "Violence in America: A Public Health Emergency: Time to Bite the Bullet Back". JAMA: The Journal of the American Medical Association. 267 (22): 3075–3076. doi:10.1001/jama.1992.03480220093036. PMID 1290487.
- Let's Talk: An Honest Conversation on Critical Issues: Abortion, Euthanasia, AIDS, Health Care by C. Everett Koop and G. Timothy Johnson. Zondervan, 1992. ISBN 0-310-59781-1
- Fries, James F.; Koop, C. Everett; Beadle, Carson E.; Cooper, Paul P.; England, Mary Jane; Greaves, Roger F.; Sokolov, Jacque J.; Wright, Daniel; The Health Project Consortium (1993). "Reducing Health Care Costs by Reducing the Need and Demand for Medical Services". New England Journal of Medicine. 329 (5): 321–325. doi:10.1056/NEJM199307293290506. PMID 8321260.
- Fries, James F.; Koop, C. Everett; Sokolov, Jacque; Beadle, Carson E.; Wright, Daniel (1998). "Beyond Health Promotion: Reducing Need and Demand for Medical Care". Health Affairs. 17 (2): 70–84. doi:10.1377/hlthaff.17.2.70. ISSN 0278-2715. PMID 9558786.
- Critical Issues in Global Health by C. Everett Koop, Clarence E. Pearson, and M. Roy Schwarz. Jossey-Bass, 2001. ISBN 0-7879-4824-1
- Koop, C. Everett; Mosher, Robyn; Kun, Luis; Geiling, Jim; Grigg, Eliot B.; Long, Sarah; Macedonia, Christian; Merrell, Ronald C.; Satava, Richard M.; Rosen, Joseph M. (2008). "Future Delivery of Health Care: Cybercare: A Distributed Network-Based Health-Care System". IEEE Engineering in Medicine and Biology Magazine. 27 (6): 29–38. doi:10.1109/MEMB.2008.929888. PMID 19004693. S2CID 1071332.
