= Understanding AIDS =

1988 US government informational pamphlet

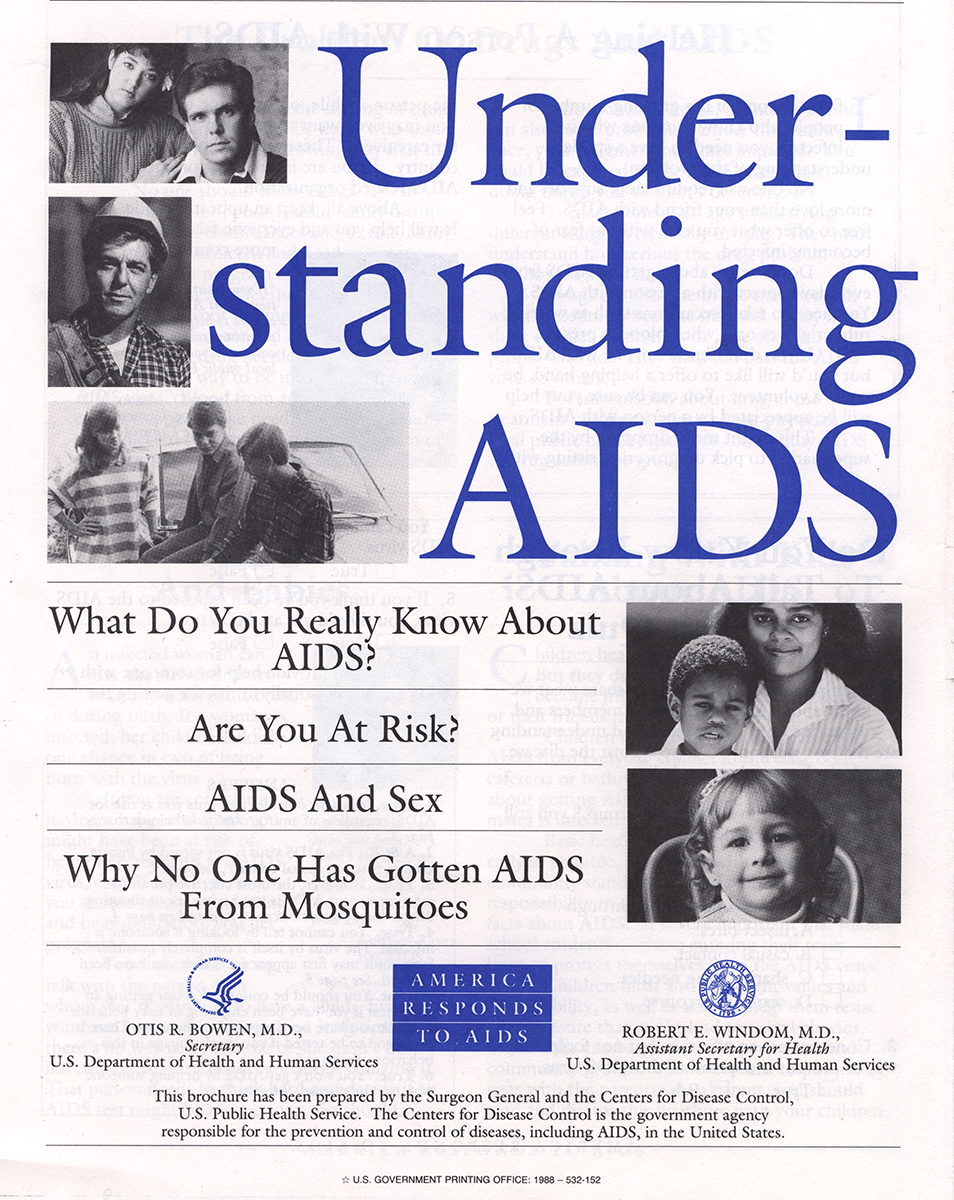
- Title page (back cover) of pamphlet
- Author: United States Public Health Service
- Language: English, Spanish
- Published: 1988
- Publication place: United States
- Pages: 8

Understanding AIDS is a pamphlet or brochure created by the United States government and mailed to every American household in 1988 as a response to the AIDS epidemic. It was the largest mass mailing in American history. The decision to create the pamphlet was made by Surgeon General C. Everett Koop, under a congressional mandate.

== Contents ==
Full contents of Understanding AIDS (PDF format)

The pamphlet contains simple information about AIDS and HIV, and factual descriptions of how it is transmitted through sexual contact and drug use. It advocates for abstinence, monogamy, condom use, and sex education for young people. It encourages the reader not to fear day-to-day contact with people with AIDS, but to instead offer them love and support.

The pamphlet is introduced by Koop and includes passages by NIAID director Anthony Fauci and CDC director James O. Mason.

== Distribution ==
Approximately 126 million copies of Understanding AIDS were distributed. Their printing and mailing cost about 20 cents per copy—in total, about $25.2 million (approx. $0.47 per copy in 2025, equivalent in total to about $59 million). The pamphlet was mailed to all 107 million US households, "making it the largest public health mailing ever."

One million advance copies of the brochure were sent to doctors, nurses, dentists, pharmacists, hospitals, and public health officials to prepare them for questions about AIDS from the public.

The 1988 distribution of Understanding AIDS was of an English-language version of the brochure, with a Spanish version distributed in Puerto Rico. Only later would the brochure be translated into other languages or distributed electronically.

== Response ==
A national survey found that at least 60 percent of people interviewed following the mailing remembered receiving Understanding AIDS. Of these, 80 percent read at least some of the pamphlet, and 40 to 50 percent reported discussing it with family or friends. Call centers for AIDS-related questions, which were created or expanded in advance of the mailer, were flooded with calls.

As a result of preparatory research on how to make the pamphlet understandable to a wide audience, the authors avoided labels for people like "gay" or "drug addicts," and instead described behaviors like anal sex or needle sharing. This type of explicit description, pioneered by Understanding AIDS, would later become standard in sex education.

The frank descriptions of human sexuality in the pamphlet upset some American religious conservatives. Phyllis Schlafly remarked that the pamphlet looks "like it was edited by the Gay Task Force" because of its avoidance of the subject of homosexuality. Jerry Falwell expressed skepticism of the pamphlet, saying a simple message of "no sex outside of marriage would have saved taxpayers' money." Surgeon General Koop was himself an Evangelical Christian and a friend of Falwell's who believed the pamphlet was consistent with his religious beliefs on sexual morality.
