= Karen Tumulty =

American journalist

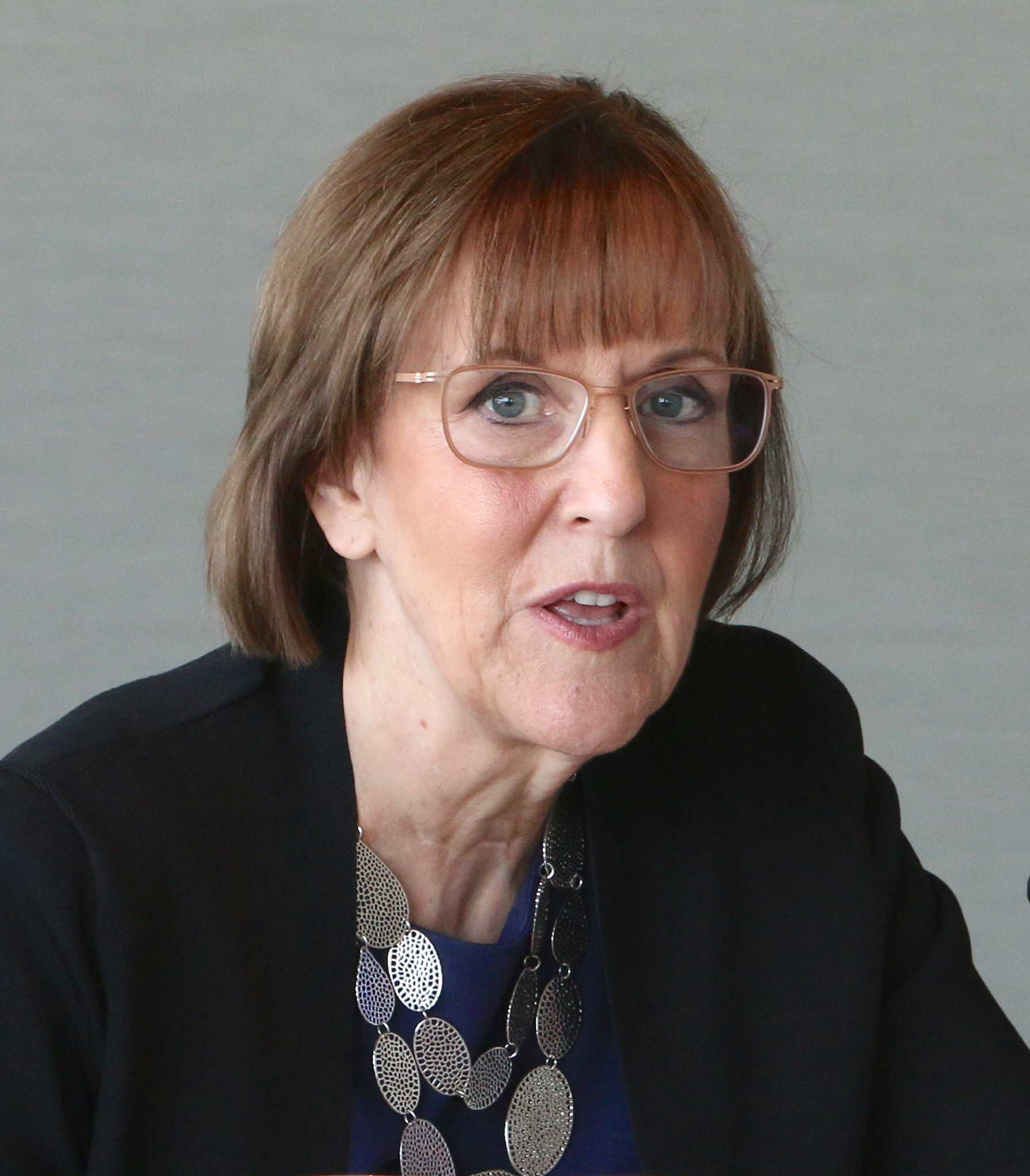
- Tumulty in 2018
- Born: Karen Emily Tumulty; December 1, 1955 (age 70); San Antonio, Texas, U.S.
- Occupation: Political columnist
- Notable credit(s): The Washington Post, Time, The Los Angeles Times
- Spouse: Paul Richter
- Children: 2

Karen Emily Tumulty (born December 1, 1955) is a political columnist for The Washington Post. Tumulty served in several capacities with Time magazine's Washington, D.C. bureau from October 1994 to April 2010, including as Congressional correspondent, national political correspondent and White House correspondent.

== Early life and education ==
Tumulty was born in San Antonio, Texas on December 1, 1955. She attended Crockett High School in Austin, Texas, where she graduated in 1973, and then the University of Texas at Austin, where she was a member of Alpha Xi Delta sorority and wrote for The Daily Texan, the university's student paper. She graduated with Bachelor of Arts with high honors in journalism in 1977. In 1981, she received a Master of Business Administration from Harvard Business School.

== Career ==
Tumulty began her career in 1977 at the since-defunct San Antonio Light.

=== Los Angeles Times ===
She then spent 14 years with the Los Angeles Times, where she covered the United States Congress, economics, business, energy, and general assignment beats. While at the Times, she won the Gerald Loeb Award for distinguished business and financial journalism in 1982 for large newspapers, and the National Press Foundation's Edwin Hood Award for diplomatic correspondence in 1993.

=== Time magazine ===
In 1994, Tumulty joined Time magazine. She covered Congress for two years, during which time she reported and wrote the magazine's 1995 "Man of the Year" profile of Newt Gingrich. In 1996, she became the magazine's White House correspondent, writing major stories on President Bill Clinton and Hillary Clinton. She became the magazine's national political correspondent in 2001. On January 16, 2006, Tumulty's profile of Jack Abramoff, "The Man Who Bought Washington", was the magazine's cover story.

In the 2008 presidential campaign, Tumulty accused the campaign of U.S. Senator John McCain of "playing the race card" for a television ad criticizing the connections between U.S. Senator Barack Obama and Franklin Raines, former CEO of Fannie Mae. Tumulty wrote that the ad displayed "sinister images of two black men, followed by one of a vulnerable-looking elderly white woman." The McCain campaign pointed out that they had also produced an ad criticizing the connections of Barack Obama to Jim Johnson, another former Fannie Mae CEO who is white. According to the McCain campaign, Tumulty did not correct her post, but responded with "I grew up in Texas. I know what this stuff looks like." The McCain campaign accused Tumulty of "hysterical liberal bias."

=== The Washington Post ===
In 2010, Tumulty joined The Washington Post, where she received the 2013 Toner Prize for Excellence in Political Reporting. She became a political columnist in 2018. In 2021, she was named deputy editorial page editor.

Tumulty's coverage of health care reform issues has been informed by her personal experience with her brother Patrick's health problems.

Besides her work in print journalism, she has appeared as a television/webcasting news analyst on the public affairs programs Washington Week on PBS, PBS NewsHour, and Special Report with Bret Baier on Fox News (as part of the 'All-Star Panel').

Admiral William H. McRaven, her fifth grade classmate and commander of USSOCOM, was her guest at the White House Correspondents' Association Dinner in 2012. Adm. McRaven commanded JSOC when it planned and carried out Operation Neptune Spear, the U.S. Navy SEAL raid that captured and killed Osama bin Laden.

== Personal life ==
Tumulty is married to Paul Richter, and they have two sons, Nicholas and Jack. She is Catholic.

== See also ==
- Fox 'All-Star Panel' members
- Washington Week panelists
