= Staple Act =

The term Staple Act may refer to any of the following pieces of legislation:-

- Statute of the Staple, a 1353 English statute
- Staple Act 1663, one of the English Navigation Acts
- Stopping Trained in America PhDs From Leaving the Economy Act, a 2011 bill in the United States Congress
