= 2012 United States Senate election in Arizona =

- November 6, 2012
- Turnout: 52.9% (voting eligible)
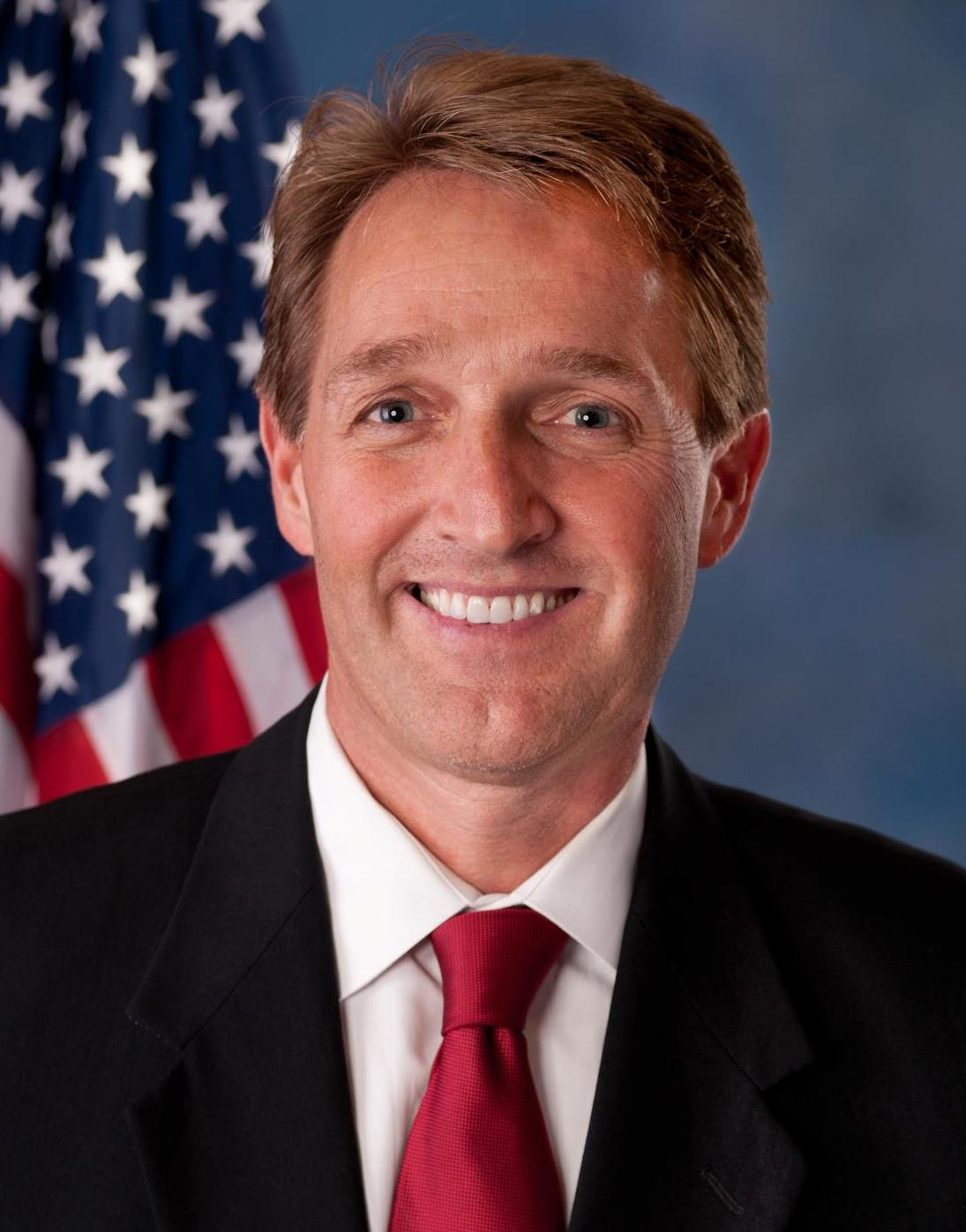

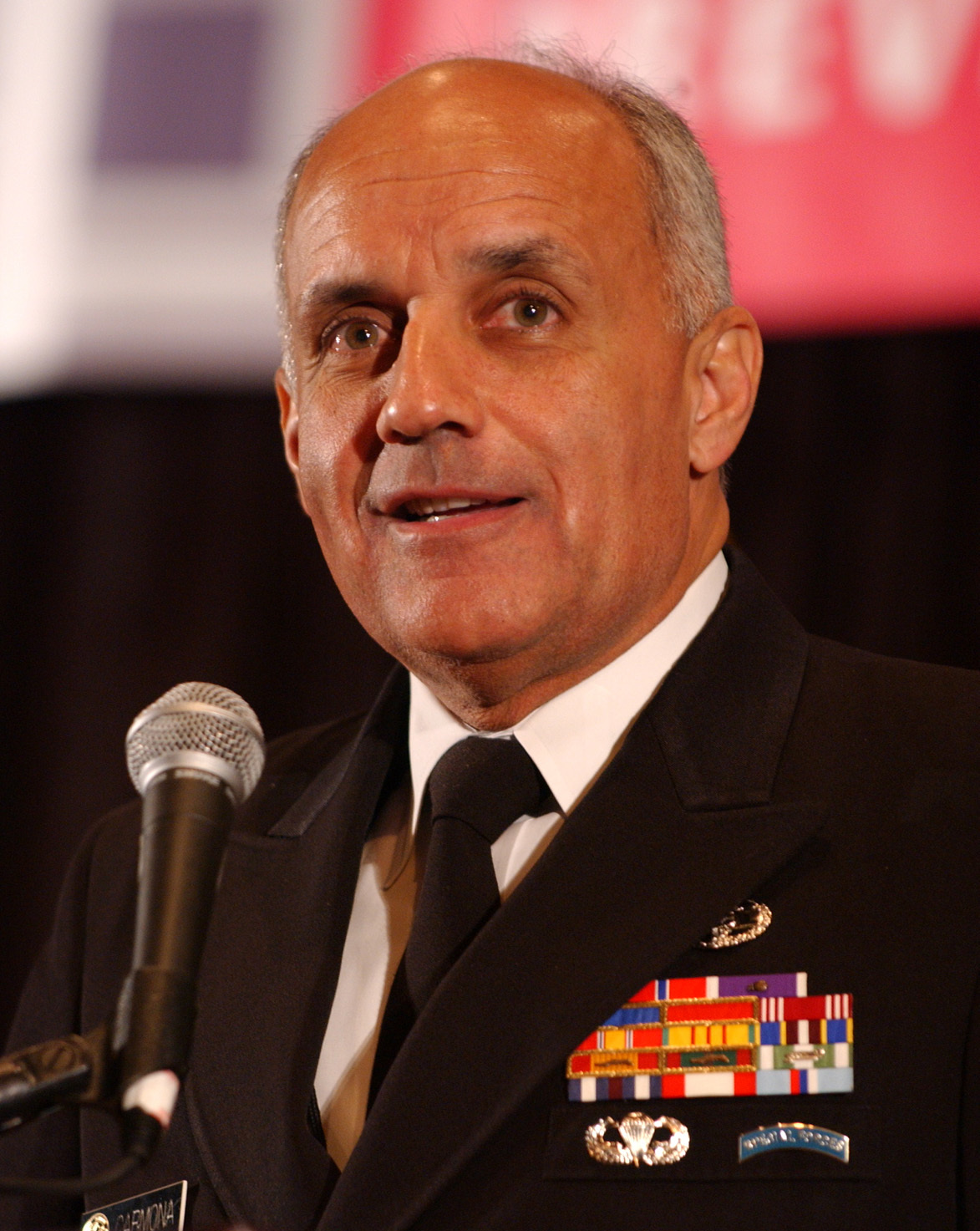
Nominee	Jeff Flake	Richard Carmona
Party	Republican	Democratic
Popular vote	1,104,457	1,036,542
Percentage	49.23%	46.20%
- Flake: 40–50% 50–60% 60–70% 70–80% 80–90% >90% Carmona: 40–50% 50–60% 60–70% 70–80% 80–90% >90% Tie: 40–50% 50% No votes
U.S. senator before election
Jon Kyl
Republican
Elected U.S. Senator
Jeff Flake
Republican

The 2012 United States Senate election in Arizona was held on November 6, 2012, alongside a presidential election, other elections to the United States Senate in other states, as well as elections to the United States House of Representatives and various state and local elections.

Incumbent Senator Jon Kyl, a Republican and the Senate minority whip, decided to retire instead of seeking a fourth term. U.S. Representative Jeff Flake won the open seat.

As of 2026, this was the last time that a Republican won Arizona's Class 1 Senate seat.

== Republican primary ==
The filing deadline for Republican candidates was June 1, 2012, and the primary election took place on August 28, 2012.

=== Candidates ===
==== Declared ====
- Wil Cardon, CEO of a real estate investment firm
- Jeff Flake, U.S. representative from the 6th district
- Bryan Hackbarth, former mayor of Youngtown
- Clair Van Steenwyk, conservative radio host

==== Withdrew ====
- Doug McKee, businessman

==== Declined ====
- Joe Arpaio, Maricopa County sheriff (running for re-election as sheriff)
- Jan Brewer, Arizona governor
- Trent Franks, U.S. representative
- J. D. Hayworth, former U.S. representative
- Jon Kyl, incumbent U.S. senator
- Sarah Palin, former governor of Alaska (2006–2009) and nominee for vice president of the United States in 2008
- Ben Quayle, U.S. representative
- David Schweikert, U.S. representative
- John Shadegg, former U.S. representative
- Fife Symington III, former Arizona governor

=== Endorsements ===
Jeff Flake
- Former Governor Sarah Palin (R-AK)
- Governor Bobby Jindal (R-LA)
- Senator Jim DeMint (R-SC) & Senate Conservatives Fund
- Senator Mike Lee (R-UT)
- Senator Rand Paul (R-KY)
- Senator Pat Toomey (R-PA)
- Senator John McCain (R-AZ)
- Senator Jon Kyl (R-AZ)
- Congressman Paul Ryan (R-WI)
- Congressman Ron Paul (R-TX)
- Arizona Association of Realtors
- Arizona Farm Bureau
- Arizona Home Builders
- Arizona Right to Life
- Arizona Sportsmen for Wildlife
- Citizens Against Government Waste
- Club for Growth
- FreedomWorks
- GING PAC
- GOProud
- NRA Political Victory Fund
- National Taxpayers Union
Wil Cardon
- Rick Santorum, former U.S. senator (R-PA)
- Congressman Trent Franks (R-AZ)
- State Senator Don Shooter (R-AZ)
- State Senator Steve Smith (R-AZ)
- State Senator Al Melvin (R-AZ)
- State Senator Judy Burges (R-AZ)
- State Representative Steve Montenegro (R-AZ)
- State Representative John Fillmore (R-AZ)
- Mayor Scott Smith of Mesa
- Mayor Elaine Scruggs of Glendale
- Americans for Legal Immigration

=== Polling ===
Poll source	Date(s) administered	Sample size	Margin of error	Wil Cardon	Jeff Flake	Bryan Hackbarth	Doug McKee	Clair Van Steenwyk	Other	Undecided
Public Policy Polling	May 17–20, 2012	421	± 4.8%	20%	42%	3%	1%	2%	—	33%
Public Policy Polling	February 17–19, 2012	412	± 4.8%	7%	56%	5%	1%	1%	—	31%
Public Policy Polling	November 17–20, 2011	400	± 4.9%	7%	53%	5%	1%	2%	—	33%
Magellan Strategies	November 14–15, 2011	722	± 3.6%	4%	52%	1%	1%	2%	8%	32%

=== Debate ===
2012 United States Senate election in Arizona Republican primary debate
No.	Date	Host	Moderator	Link	Republican	Republican	Republican	Republican
Key: P Participant A Absent N Not invited I Invited W Withdrawn								
Key: P Participant A Absent N Not invited I Invited W Withdrawn					Wil Cardon	Jeff Flake	Bryan Hackbarth	Clair Van Steenwyk
1	Aug. 16, 2012	Arizona PBS	Ted Simons	YouTube	P	P	P	P

=== Results ===
Results by county: Flake—70–80% Flake—60–70% Flake—50–60%

Republican primary results
Party	Candidate	Votes	%
Republican	Jeff Flake	357,360	69.3%
Republican	Wil Cardon	110,150	21.4%
Republican	Clair Van Steenwyk	29,159	5.6%
Republican	Bryan Hackbarth	19,174	3.7%
Republican	John Lyon (Write-in)	126	nil
Republican	Luis Acle (Write-in)	56	nil
Total votes		516,025	100%

== Democratic primary ==
Former Surgeon General Richard Carmona was the only candidate for the Democratic nomination, receiving all 289,881 votes cast in the primary election.

=== Candidates ===
==== Declared ====
- Richard Carmona, former surgeon general of the United States

==== Withdrew ====
- Don Bivens, former chairman of the Arizona Democratic Party
- David Ruben, physician

==== Declined ====
- Dennis Burke, United States attorney
- Gabby Giffords, former U.S. representative
- Phil Gordon, mayor of Phoenix
- Mark Kelly, astronaut and husband of Gabrielle Giffords (later elected to Arizona's Class 3 Senate seat in 2020).
- Janet Napolitano, U.S. secretary of Homeland Security and former Arizona governor
- Ed Pastor, U.S. representative
- Jim Pederson, former Arizona Democratic Party chairman and 2006 Democratic nominee for U.S. Senate
- Warren Stewart, civil rights leader

=== Polling ===
Hypothetical polling

Poll source	Date(s) administered	Sample size	Margin of error	Dennis Burke	Rodney Glassman	Terry Goddard	Phil Gordan	Harry Mitchell	Ed Pastor	Felecia Rotellini	Other/ Undecided
Public Policy Polling	April 28 – May 1, 2011	300	± 5.7%	2%	5%	50%	8%	11%	5%	6%	14%

=== Results ===
Democratic primary results
Party	Candidate	Votes	%
Democratic	Richard Carmona	289,881	100%
Total votes		289,881	100%

== General election ==
=== Candidates ===
- Richard Carmona (Democratic), former U.S. surgeon general
- Jeff Flake (Republican), U.S. representative
- Michael F. Meyer (independent)
- Marc J. Victor (Libertarian), attorney

=== Debates ===
There were three debates before the election. The first was in Phoenix on October 10, 2012, the second in Tucson on October 15 and the last was in Yuma on October 25.

External links

- Complete video of debate, October 10, 2012 – C-SPAN
- Complete video of debate, October 15, 2012 – C-SPAN
- Complete video of debate, October 25, 2012 – C-SPAN

=== Fundraising ===
Candidate (party)	Receipts	Disbursements	Cash on hand	Debt
Jeff Flake (R)	$9,026,951	$9,557,420	$97,360	$0
Richard Carmona (D)	$6,459,739	$6,373,544	$86,195	$0
Marc J. Victor (L)	$8,336	$8,334	$0	$0
Source: Federal Election Commission

==== Top contributors ====
Richard Carmona	Contribution	Jeff Flake	Contribution
University of Arizona	$54,100	Club for Growth	$1,000,112
League of Conservation Voters	$53,148	Senate Conservatives Fund	$176,484
Canyon Ranch	$31,400	US Airways	$54,300
Clorox Company	$25,000	Freeport-McMoRan	$53,750
Arizona State University	$22,600	Cancer Treatment Centers of America	$40,500
Banner Health	$18,500	Knight Transportation	$35,500
Lewis and Roca	$17,100	Pinnacle West Capital	$35,500
Taser International	$15,500	Marriott International	$29,750
Coca-Cola Co	$15,286	Shamrock Farms	$24,750
Pederson Group	$15,000	Services Group of America	$15,650
Source: OpenSecrets

==== Top industries ====
Richard Carmona	Contribution	Jeff Flake	Contribution	Ian Gilyeat	Contribution
Retired	$653,066	Republican/Conservative	$1,146,046	Retired	$250
Lawyers/law firms	$409,395	Retired	$643,260	Lawyers/law firms	$250
Health professionals	$313,135	Leadership PACs	$502,352		
Leadership PACs	$279,530	Real estate	$302,572		
Colleges/universities	$189,270	Financial institutions	$279,670		
Real estate	$145,000	Lawyers/law firms	$200,702		
Business services	$122,749	Misc. finance	$188,122		
Financial institutions	$118,500	Mining	$170,602		
Democratic/Liberal	$111,889	Health professionals	$164,607		
Lobbyists	$105,172	Oil & gas	$147,860		
Source: OpenSecrets

=== Predictions ===
Source	Ranking	As of
The Cook Political Report	Tossup	November 1, 2012
Sabato's Crystal Ball	Lean R	November 5, 2012
Rothenberg Political Report	Tilt R	November 2, 2012
Real Clear Politics	Lean R	November 5, 2012

=== Polling ===
Poll source	Date(s) administered	Sample size	Margin of error	Jeff Flake (R)	Richard Carmona (D)	Other	Undecided
Public Policy Polling	November 2–3, 2012	1,080	± 3%	51%	46%	—	3%
Rasmussen Reports	October 21, 2012	500	± 4.5%	50%	44%	3%	3%
Rocky Mountain Poll	October 4–10, 2012	523	± 4.4%	40%	44%	—	16%
Public Policy Polling	October 1–3, 2012	595	± 4%	43%	45%	—	12%
HighGround/Moore	September 25–26, 2012	500	± 4%	43%	40%	5%	11%
Rasmussen Reports	September 25, 2012	500	± 4.5%	47%	41%	3%	9%
LCV/Public Policy Polling	September 7–9, 2012	993	± n/a%	44%	43%	—	13%
LCV/Public Policy Polling	July 23–25, 2012	833	± 3.4%	38%	38%	—	25%
Rasmussen Reports	June 26, 2012	500	± 4.5%	47%	31%	5%	17%
Public Policy Polling	June 4–5, 2012	791	± 3.5%	43%	41%	—	16%
Public Policy Polling	May 17–20, 2012	500	± 4.4%	48%	35%	—	17%
Magellan Strategies	April 30 – May 2, 2012	909	± 3.3%	44%	40%	—	16%
Rasmussen Reports	March 13, 2012	500	± 4.5%	47%	34%	4%	16%
NBC News/Marist	February 19–20, 2012	2,487	± 2.0%	42%	29%	—	28%
Public Policy Polling	February 17–19, 2012	743	± 3.6%	46%	35%	—	19%
Public Policy Polling	November 17–20, 2011	500	± 4.4%	40%	36%	—	24%

Hypothetical polling

Poll source	Date(s) administered	Sample size	Margin of error	Wil Cardon (R)	Richard Carmona (D)	Other	Undecided
Public Policy Polling	November 17–20, 2011	500	± 4.4%	35%	33%	—	32%
Public Policy Polling	February 17–19, 2012	743	± 3.6%	37%	33%	—	30%
Rasmussen Reports	March 13, 2012	500	± 4.5%	39%	38%	3%	20%
Magellan Strategies	April 30 – May 2, 2012	909	± 3.3%	41%	40%	—	19%
Public Policy Polling	May 17–20, 2012	500	± 4.4%	40%	37%	—	23%

Republican primary

Poll source	Date(s) administered	Sample size	Margin of error	Jeff Flake	J.D. Hayworth	Sarah Palin	Gary Pierce	Marilyn Quayle	Fife Symington	Other/ Undecided
Public Policy Polling	April 28 – May 1, 2011	400	± 4.9%	33%	11%	35%	3%	2%	3%	13%

Democratic primary

Poll source	Date(s) administered	Sample size	Margin of error	Dennis Burke	Gabrielle Giffords	Rodney Glassman	Terry Goddard	Phil Gordan	Harry Mitchell	Ed Pastor	Felecia Rotellini	Other/ Undecided
Public Policy Polling	April 28 – May 1, 2011	300	± 5.7%	2%	46%	4%	28%	2%	5%	4%	2%	6%

with Don Bivens

Poll source	Date(s) administered	Sample size	Margin of error	Wil Cardon (R)	Don Bivens (D)	Other	Undecided
Public Policy Polling	November 17–20, 2011	500	± 4.4%	35%	27%	—	37%
Public Policy Polling	February 17–19, 2012	743	± 3.6%	38%	32%	—	31%
Rasmussen Reports	March 13, 2012	500	± 4.5%	42%	30%	4%	24%

Poll source	Date(s) administered	Sample size	Margin of error	Jeff Flake (R)	Don Bivens (D)	Other	Undecided
Public Policy Polling	November 17–20, 2011	500	± 4.4%	42%	32%	—	26%
Public Policy Polling	February 17–19, 2012	743	± 3.6%	46%	35%	—	19%
Rasmussen Reports	March 13, 2012	500	± 4.5%	47%	30%	3%	20%

with J.D. Hayworth

Poll source	Date(s) administered	Sample size	Margin of error	J.D. Hayworth (R)	Gabrielle Giffords (D)	Undecided
Public Policy Polling	April 28 – May 1, 2011	623	± 3.9%	31%	57%	12%

Poll source	Date(s) administered	Sample size	Margin of error	J.D. Hayworth (R)	Terry Goddard (D)	Undecided
Public Policy Polling	April 28 – May 1, 2011	623	± 3.9%	33%	51%	16%

Poll source	Date(s) administered	Sample size	Margin of error	J.D. Hayworth (R)	Phil Gordon (D)	Undecided
Public Policy Polling	April 28 – May 1, 2011	623	± 3.9%	36%	44%	20%

Poll source	Date(s) administered	Sample size	Margin of error	J.D. Hayworth (R)	Ed Pastor (D)	Undecided
Public Policy Polling	April 28 – May 1, 2011	623	± 3.9%	37%	42%	21%

with Jeff Flake

Poll source	Date(s) administered	Sample size	Margin of error	Jeff Flake (R)	Gabrielle Giffords (D)	Undecided
Public Policy Polling	April 28 – May 1, 2011	623	± 3.9%	41%	48%	11%

with Jon Kyl

Poll source	Date(s) administered	Sample size	Margin of error	Jon Kyl (R)	Terry Goddard (D)	Undecided
Public Policy Polling	January 28–30, 2011	599	± 4.0%	50%	40%	9%

Poll source	Date(s) administered	Sample size	Margin of error	Jon Kyl (R)	Phil Gordon (D)	Undecided
Public Policy Polling	January 28–30, 2011	599	± 4.0%	54%	33%	13%

Poll source	Date(s) administered	Sample size	Margin of error	Jon Kyl (R)	Ann Kirkpatrick (D)	Undecided
Public Policy Polling	January 28–30, 2011	599	± 4.0%	51%	35%	14%

Poll source	Date(s) administered	Sample size	Margin of error	Jon Kyl (R)	Janet Napolitano (D)	Undecided
Public Policy Polling	January 28–30, 2011	599	± 4.0%	53%	41%	6%

with Sarah Palin

Poll source	Date(s) administered	Sample size	Margin of error	Sarah Palin (R)	Gabrielle Giffords (D)	Undecided
Public Policy Polling	April 28 – May 1, 2011	623	± 3.9%	36%	54%	10%

Poll source	Date(s) administered	Sample size	Margin of error	Sarah Palin (R)	Terry Goddard (D)	Undecided
Public Policy Polling	April 28 – May 1, 2011	623	± 3.9%	40%	49%	11%

Poll source	Date(s) administered	Sample size	Margin of error	Sarah Palin (R)	Phil Gordon (D)	Undecided
Public Policy Polling	April 28 – May 1, 2011	623	± 3.9%	41%	45%	13%

Poll source	Date(s) administered	Sample size	Margin of error	Sarah Palin (R)	Ed Pastor (D)	Undecided
Public Policy Polling	April 28 – May 1, 2011	623	± 3.9%	43%	45%	12%

=== Results ===
United States Senate election in Arizona, 2012
Party	Candidate	Votes	%	±%
Republican	Jeff Flake	1,104,457	49.23%	−4.11%
Democratic	Richard Carmona	1,036,542	46.20%	+2.70%
Libertarian	Marc J. Victor	102,109	4.55%	+1.39%
Independent	Steven Watts (write-in)	290	0.01%	N/A
Independent	Don Manspeaker (write-in)	24	0.00%	N/A
Majority		67,915	3.03%	−6.81%
Total votes		2,243,422	100.00%	N/A
Republican hold				

By county

County	Richard Carmona Democratic		Jeff Flake Republican		Others	
County	#	%	#	%	#	%
Apache	16,455	65.1%	7,680	30.4%	1,128	4.4%
Cochise	19,736	40.9%	26,208	54.3%	2,344	4.9%
Coconino	28,723	56.6%	19,334	38.1%	2,650	5.2%
Gila	8,099	38.2%	11,954	56.4%	1,154	5.5%
Graham	3,771	32.2%	7,352	62.8%	585	5.0%
Greenlee	1,342	46.1%	1,365	46.9%	205	7.0%
La Paz	1,961	35.6%	3,120	56.6%	431	7.8%
Maricopa	602,809	44.9%	675,500	50.3%	64,109	4.8%
Mohave	20,865	30.6%	42,410	62.2%	4,924	7.2%
Navajo	16,881	45.9%	18,228	49.6%	1,670	4.5%
Pima	207,578	55.5%	153,846	41.1%	12,631	3.4%
Pinal	45,558	42.8%	55,008	51.6%	5,996	5.6%
Santa Cruz	9,454	69.9%	3,617	26.7%	452	3.3%
Yavapai	34,902	35.6%	57,838	59.0%	5,211	5.3%
Yuma	18,408	45.4%	20,997	51.8%	1,120	4.6%
Totals	1,036,542	46.2%	1,104,457	49.2%	104,610	4.6%

==== By congressional district ====
Despite losing, Carmona carried five of nine congressional districts.

District	Carmona	Flake	Representative
1st	49.11%	46.32%	Ann Kirkpatrick
2nd	51.52%	45.03%	Ron Barber
3rd	63.08%	32.79%	Raúl Grijalva
4th	33.36%	60.94%	Paul Gosar
5th	35.52%	60.06%	Matt Salmon
6th	40.32%	55.35%	David Schweikert
7th	71.87%	23.14%	Ed Pastor
8th	38.9%	56.29%	Trent Franks
9th	51.77%	43.39%	Kyrsten Sinema

== See also ==
- 2012 United States Senate elections
- 2012 United States House of Representatives elections in Arizona
