= Kenneth P. Moritsugu =

American physician and public health administrator (born 1945)

Kenneth Moritsugu
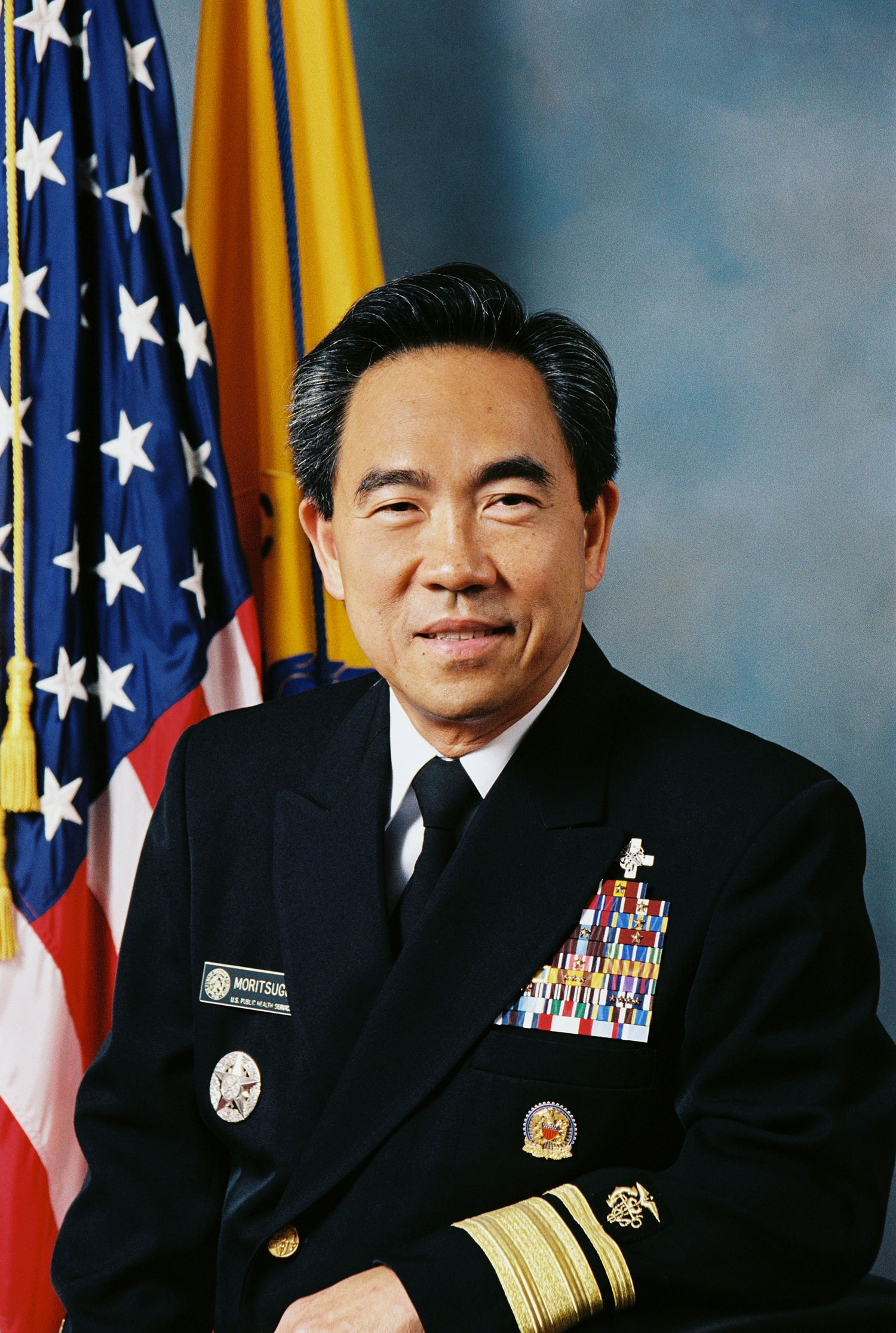

Surgeon General of the United States
- Acting
- In office August 1, 2006 – September 30, 2007
- President: George W. Bush
- Preceded by: Richard Carmona
- Succeeded by: Steven K. Galson (acting)
- In office February 13, 2002 – August 4, 2002
- President: George W. Bush
- Preceded by: David Satcher
- Succeeded by: Richard Carmona

Personal details
- Born: March 5, 1945 (age 81) Honolulu, Hawaii
- Education: University of Hawaiʻi at Mānoa (BS); George Washington University (MD); University of California, Berkeley (MPH)

Military service
- Allegiance: United States
- Service: U.S. Public Health Service
- Service years: 1971–2007
- Rank: Rear admiral

Kenneth P. Moritsugu (born March 5, 1945) is an American physician and public health administrator who was the first Asian American U.S. Surgeon General.

Mortisugu was a rear admiral in the USPHSCC, who retired in September 2007 as acting Surgeon General. A third-generation Japanese-American, he was appointed the Deputy Surgeon General on October 1, 1998 and named acting Surgeon General on July 31, 2006. In 2005, Moritsugu was elected as a fellow of the National Academy of Public Administration.

Moritsugu received his bachelor's degree in 1967 from University of Hawaiʻi at Mānoa, his Doctor of Medicine from George Washington University School of Medicine & Health Sciences in 1971, and a Master of Public Health (Health Administration and Planning) from the UC Berkeley School of Public Health in 1975.

He is Hospitaller Ambassador of the Order of Saint Lazarus.

== Personal ==
In the 2024 United States presidential election, Moritsugu endorsed Kamala Harris.

== Awards and decorations ==
Moritsugu has received awards and decorations from the USPHS, the Federal Bureau of Prisons, the United States Army, the Department of Defense and the United States Coast Guard. Among them are:

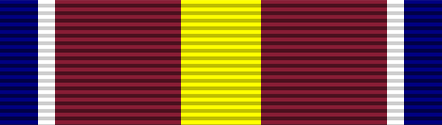
Public Health Service Distinguished Service Medal
Federal Bureau of Prisons Distinguished Service Medal (Gold Medal)
Public Health Service Meritorious Service Medal
Federal Bureau of Prisons Meritorious Service Medal (Silver Medal)
Surgeon General's Exemplary Service Medal
Public Health Service Outstanding Service Medal
Public Health Service Commendation Medal
Public Health Service Achievement Medal
Army Achievement Medal
Joint Meritorious Unit Award
Coast Guard Arctic Service Medal

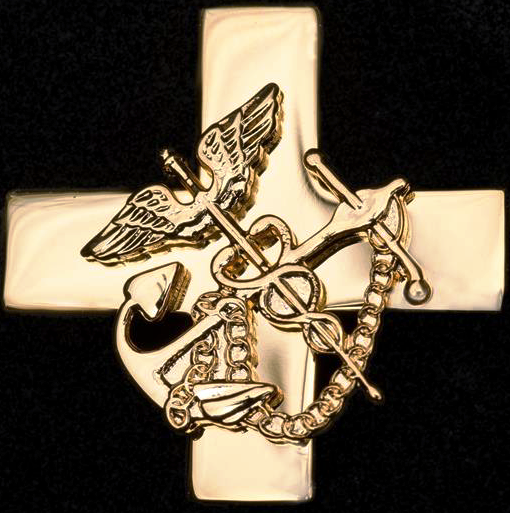
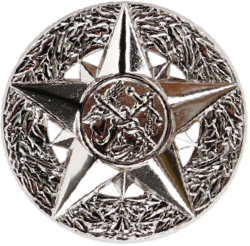
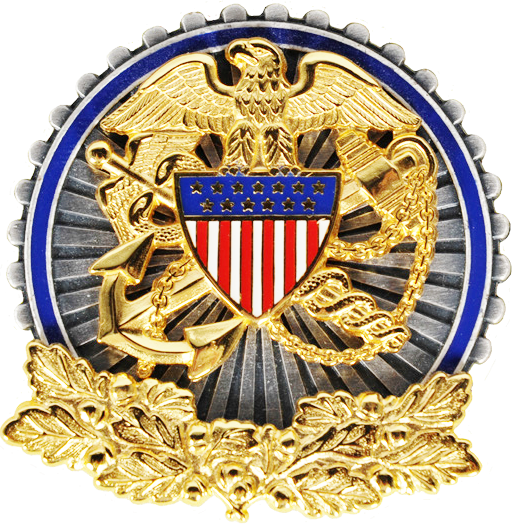
Field Medical Readiness Badge
Deputy Surgeon General Badge
Department of Health and Human Services Identification Badge
