= Richard Carmona =

American physician and politician (born 1949)

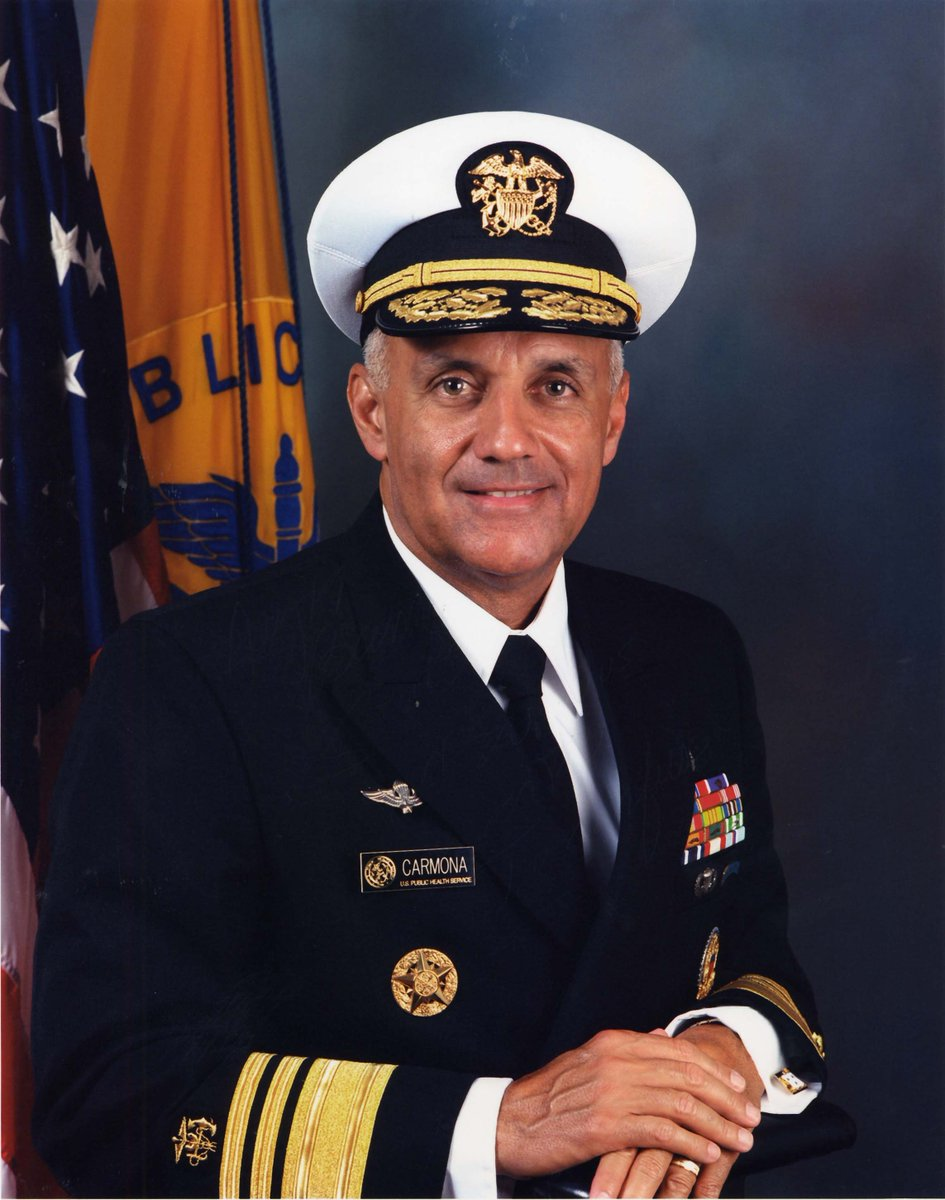

17th Surgeon General of the United States
- In office August 5, 2002 – July 31, 2006
- President: George W. Bush
- Preceded by: Kenneth P. Moritsugu (acting)
- Succeeded by: Kenneth P. Moritsugu (acting)

Personal details
- Born: Richard Henry Carmona; November 22, 1949 (age 76) New York City, New York, U.S.
- Party: Independent (before 2011); Democratic (2011–present)
- Spouse: Diana Sanchez
- Children: 4
- Education: Bronx Community College (AA); University of California, San Francisco (BS, MD); University of Arizona (MPH)

Military service
- Branch/service: United States Army; U.S. Public Health Service
- Rank: Vice Admiral
- Unit: Public Health Service Commissioned Corps; Army Special Forces
- Battles/wars: Vietnam War

Richard Henry Carmona (born November 22, 1949) is an American physician, nurse, police officer, public health administrator, and politician. He was a vice admiral in the Public Health Service Commissioned Corps and served as the seventeenth Surgeon General of the United States. Appointed by President George W. Bush in 2002, Carmona left office at the end of July 2006 upon the expiration of his term. After leaving office, Carmona was highly critical of the Bush administration for suppressing scientific findings which conflicted with the administration's ideological agenda.

In August 2006, Carmona returned home to Tucson, Arizona. In November 2011, he announced he would seek the Democratic Party's nomination for United States Senate in the hopes of succeeding outgoing Republican Senator Jon Kyl, despite being registered as a political independent. He narrowly lost to Republican challenger Congressman Jeff Flake.

== Early life, education, and early career ==
Carmona was born in New York City, of Puerto Rican descent, and raised in Harlem. After dropping out of DeWitt Clinton High School at age 16, he enlisted in the U.S. Army in 1967. While enlisted, he received his General Educational Development (GED), joined the United States Army Special Forces, became a combat-decorated Vietnam War veteran, and began his career in medicine as a Special Forces Medic. For injuries he sustained in Vietnam, Carmona received two Purple Hearts.

After leaving active duty, Carmona attended the Bronx Community College of the City University of New York, where he earned his associate of arts degree in nursing. In 1977, he graduated from the University of California, San Francisco (UCSF), with a Bachelor of Science degree in biology and chemistry; in 1979, he received his medical degree from UCSF, where he was awarded the gold-headed cane as the top graduate. In 1998, he earned a Master's degree in Public Health (M.P.H.) from the University of Arizona.

== Medical career ==
Carmona worked in various positions in the medical field including paramedic, registered nurse, and physician. He completed a surgical residency at UCSF and a National Institutes of Health-sponsored fellowship in trauma, burns, and critical care. Carmona is a Fellow of the American College of Surgeons and certified in correctional health care and in quality assurance. Carmona has been Chairman of the Arizona Southern Regional Emergency Medical System, Chief Medical Officer, hospital CEO, public health officer, and chief executive officer of the Pima County health care system. In 1997, the Pima County system, which was in financial trouble before he was appointed, continued to lose millions of dollars and he resigned. Carmona was not in control of the assets of the system but was held responsible for them. Carmona is also a professor of medicine at the University of Arizona.

== Law enforcement career ==
Carmona worked for the Pima County Sheriff's Department since 1986, eventually working his way up to deputy sheriff. He served as medical director of the county's police and fire departments. He was a peace officer leader of the SWAT division, with expertise in special operations and emergency preparedness, including weapons of mass destruction.

In 1999, Carmona was off duty when he killed a motorist in a shootout at a Tucson intersection. Accounts of the incident vary, but Carmona says he spotted a driver assaulting another driver after a car accident and pulled over to help. Bystanders warned Carmona that the motorist was armed, and in the confrontation that ensued, which started by the motorist starting to place his gun down but quickly after grabs and shoots, grazing Carmona in the head, Carmona fired his weapon seven times, hitting the man three times and killing him. In the police interview at the scene, Carmona told officials he did not try to administer first aid after shooting the victim. Instead, he returned to his car to reload his weapon.

== Surgeon General ==
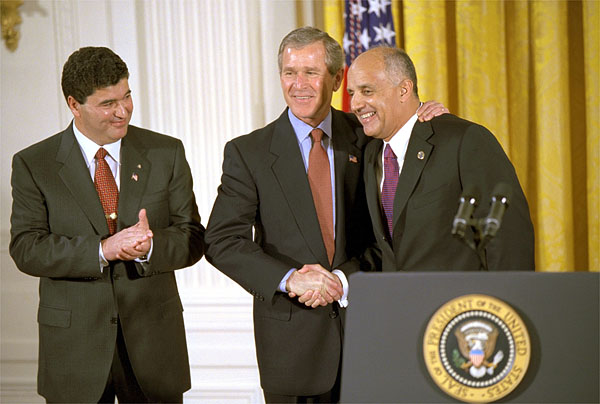
Carmona with President George W. Bush and Elias Zerhouni

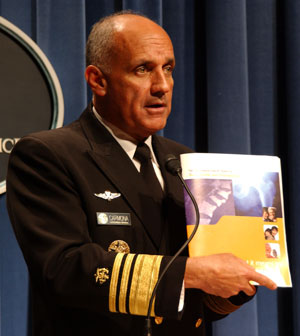
Carmona releases a report on osteoporosis.

=== Nomination ===
President Bush nominated Carmona to become the 17th Surgeon General of the United States in March 2002. During the nomination process, Carmona was questioned about his management style and the amount of time it took him to become board-certified in his field. Carmona described himself as an "agent of change" willing to question the status quo, but that he always treated "patients, staff, and co-workers with respect." Senators on both sides of the aisle praised Carmona's qualifications and supported his nomination; he was confirmed by the U.S. Senate on July 23, 2002, by a vote of 98–0.

=== Secondhand smoke ===
In 2006, Carmona released a landmark Surgeon General's report on the health effects of secondhand smoke. Carmona's report underlined the risks of secondhand smoke exposure, stating: "The debate is over. The science is clear: Secondhand smoke is not a mere annoyance, but a serious health hazard." The report encouraged the adoption of indoor smoking bans and noted that such bans did not appear to have a harmful economic effect on bars and restaurants. After leaving office, Carmona testified before Congress that the Bush administration had tried for years to "water down" his findings on the dangers of secondhand smoke, and had pressured him not to testify in the tobacco industry's racketeering trial.

In 2003 testimony before the U.S. Congress, Carmona had stated that he would not object to a ban on all tobacco products "if Congress chose to go that way." The Bush administration distanced itself from this statement.

== Post-Surgeon General career ==
In 2006, Republicans attempted to recruit Carmona to run for Congress in Arizona's 8th congressional district, but he declined.

On June 16, 2010, Ross University School of Medicine named Carmona to its board of trustees.

On October 25, 2013, Carmona joined the Herbalife Board of Directors. Dr. Carmona commented, "As a scientist and medical professional, I was first attracted by the depth and breadth of Herbalife's commitment to excellence in nutrition science. As a business person, my due diligence showed me a company of integrity with a good business plan. As the son of poor emigrant parents, I am elated to see the opportunities Herbalife offers to families in health-disparate and economically underserved communities."

As of 2020 Carmona was vice chairman of the Canyon Ranch resort and spa company, president of the non-profit Canyon Ranch Institute, and a professor at the Mel and Enid Zuckerman College of Public Health at the University of Arizona. He is in-charge of COVID-19 response at the University of Arizona.

On September 6, 2021, Carmona joined the McKesson Corporation's board of directors as a new independent director and the Board of Directors Compensation and Compliance Committees.

Dr. Carmona currently serves as an advisor and community ambassador for Rockin' 4 Heroes, a nonprofit organization that produces an annual free concert in Southern Arizona to thank and support First Responders, Active Duty Military, Veterans and Gold Star families through multiple scholarships and financial assistance.

=== Criticism of Bush administration ===
On July 10, 2007, Carmona, along with former Surgeons General C. Everett Koop and David Satcher, testified before the United States House Committee on Oversight and Government Reform about political and ideological interference with the Surgeon General's mission. Carmona accused the Bush administration of preventing him from speaking out on certain public health issues such as embryonic stem cell research, global climate change, emergency contraception, and abstinence-only sex education, where the administration's political stance conflicted with scientific and medical opinion.

Carmona also testified that the Bush administration had attempted for years to "water down" his report on the dangers of secondhand smoke and pressured him not to testify in the tobacco industry's racketeering trial: "Anything that doesn't fit into the political appointees' ideological, theological or political agenda is ignored, marginalized or simply buried." According to Carmona, he was even ordered not to attend the Special Olympics because the event was sponsored by the Kennedy family, and was told to mention President Bush three times on every page of his speeches. The Washington Post subsequently identified William R. Steiger as the Bush administration official who had blocked release of Carmona's report on global health because it conflicted with the administration's political priorities.

Carmona said that his predecessors as Surgeon General had told him, "We have never seen it as partisan, as malicious, as vindictive, as mean-spirited as it is today, and you clearly have worse than anyone's had." Koop's testimony indicated that he had been subject to less political pressure than his successors: President Reagan was pressed by his officials to fire him, but Reagan refused. Moreover, Koop indicated that each of his successors had had less access to the Secretary of Health and Human Services than he had: Satcher had been granted less access than him, and "Dr. Carmona was treated with even less respect than Dr. Satcher."

== 2012 U.S. Senate election ==
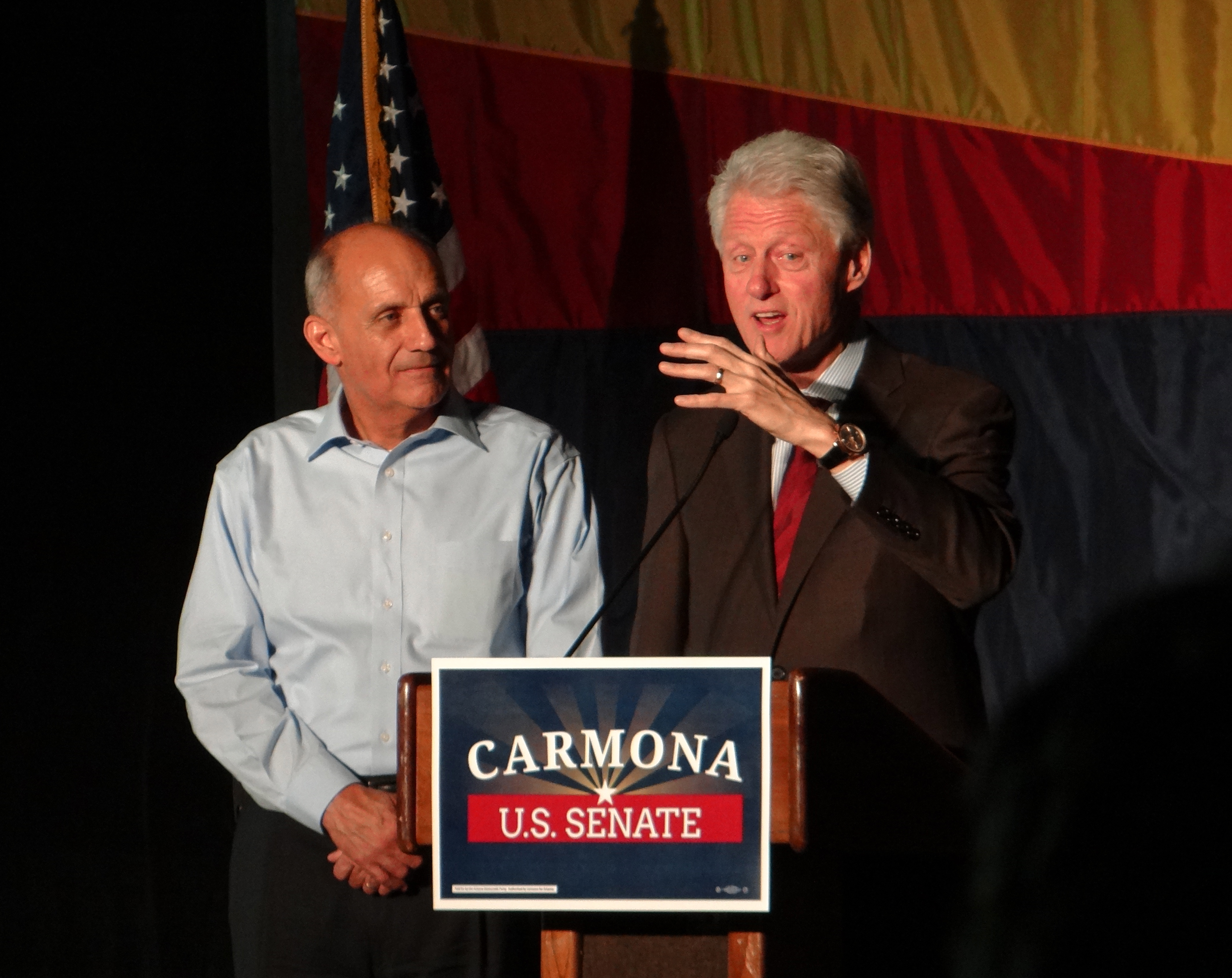
Carmona campaigning with former President Bill Clinton

Carmona was the Democratic nominee for U.S. Senate in Arizona in the race to replace retiring Republican Senator Jon Kyl. Carmona said that he would bring his experience in science and medicine to the Senate, which will inform his analytical approach to the issues. He has been critical of politicians like Todd Akin and said that health issues should not be politicized.

On November 6, 2012, he lost to Republican challenger Jeff Flake.

== Electoral history ==
United States Senate election in Arizona, 2012
Party	Candidate	Votes	%	±%
Republican	Jeff Flake	1,104,457	49.2%	−4.1%
Democratic	Richard Carmona	1,036,542	46.2%	+2.7%
Libertarian	Marc J. Victor	102,109	4.6%	+1.4%
N/A	write-in	2,501	0.1%	nil
Majority		67,915	3.0%	−6.8%
Turnout		2,245,609	100.0%	

== Personal life ==
Carmona is married to Diana Sanchez. They have two daughters, two sons, two granddaughters, and two grandsons. Carmona resides in Tucson, Arizona.

In the 2024 United States presidential election, Carmona endorsed Kamala Harris.

== Awards and decorations ==
Awards and decorations as depicted on Vice Admiral Carmona's United States Public Health Service Commissioned Corps' uniform during his tenure as Surgeon General of the United States.

Badge	Combat Medical Badge		
Badge	U.S. Army Parachutist Badge		
1st row	Bronze Star Medal		Purple Heart (with Oak Leaf Cluster)
2nd row	Surgeon General's Medallion	Presidential Unit Citation	Public Health Service Unit Commendation
3rd row	Public Health Service Unit Commendation	Army Meritorious Unit Commendation	Army Good Conduct Medal
4th row	National Defense Service Medal	Vietnam Service Medal	Public Health Service Regular Corps Ribbon
5th row	Republic of Vietnam Gallantry Cross Unit Citation	Republic of Vietnam Civil Actions Unit Citation	Republic of Vietnam Campaign Medal
6th row	Commissioned Officers Association ribbon	Association of Military Surgeons of the United States ribbon	Reserve Officers Association ribbon

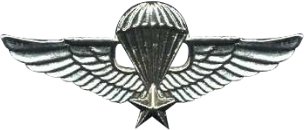
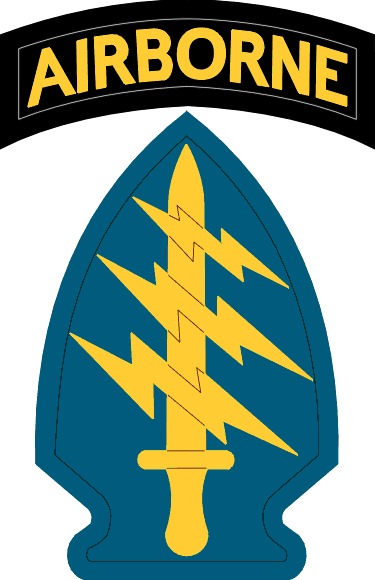

Badge	U.S. Army 1st Special Forces (Airborne) Distinctive Unit Insignia
Badge	Army of the Republic of Vietnam Parachutist Badge
Badge	5th Special Forces Group (Airborne) Shoulder sleeve insignia

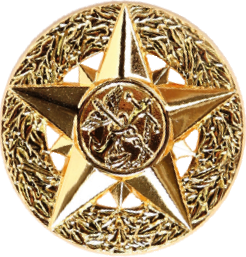
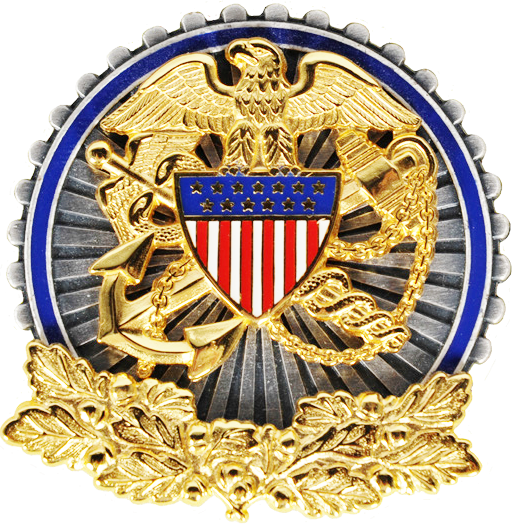

Badges	Special Forces Tab	Surgeon General (SG) Badge	U.S. Department of Health and Human Services Identification Badge

== See also ==
- List of Puerto Ricans
- List of Puerto Rican military personnel

Military offices
Preceded by Kenneth Moritsugu; Acting	Surgeon General of the United States; 2002–2006	Succeeded by Kenneth Moritsugu; Acting
Party political offices
Preceded by Jim Pederson	Democratic nominee for U.S. Senator from Arizona (Class 1); 2012	Succeeded by Kyrsten Sinema
