= Senate Conservatives Fund =

American political action committee

- Abbreviation: SCF
- Formation: 2008; 18 years ago
- Founder: Jim DeMint
- Founded at: South Carolina
- Type: political action committee

The Senate Conservatives Fund (SCF) is a United States political action committee (PAC) that supports conservative Republican Party candidates in primaries and general elections. The SCF primarily focuses on supporting United States Senate candidates. The PAC was founded by then-U.S. Senator Jim DeMint of South Carolina in 2008.

== History ==
U.S. Senator Jim DeMint founded Senate Conservatives Fund during summer 2008.

In 2010, SCF raised $9.3 million, supporting successful Senate candidates Mike Lee of Utah (who defeated incumbent Republican Sen. Bob Bennett in a Republican primary), Rand Paul of Kentucky, Marco Rubio of Florida, Pat Toomey of Pennsylvania, and Ron Johnson of Wisconsin. SCF also supported a number of unsuccessful 2010 candidates, including Sharron Angle in Nevada, Ken Buck in Colorado, Joe Miller in Alaska, John Raese in West Virginia, Dino Rossi in Washington, and Christine O'Donnell in Delaware.

DeMint left SCF in 2012. SCF, along with its affiliated super PAC, raised $16.5 million during the 2011-2012 election cycle. In 2012, SCF spent more than $8.7 million, endorsing nine Republican U.S. Senate candidates; three of those nine candidates—Ted Cruz, Jeff Flake, and Deb Fischer—were elected.

SCF has aligned itself with U.S. Senator Ted Cruz and has levied attacks on Senators Mitch McConnell and Lamar Alexander. In 2013, the fund orchestrated a robocall and direct mail campaign to generate signatures for an anti-Affordable Care Act petition. SCF also endorsed a strategy to defund Obamacare that culminated in the 2013 shutdown of the federal government. Republican Senate leaders have criticized SCF for targeting incumbent Senate Republicans.

In the 2013–2014 election cycle, SCF supported Matt Bevin and provided significant funding to Bevin's Republican primary challenge to then-Senate Minority Leader McConnell in the State of Kentucky. SCF also supported Chris McDaniel of Mississippi in a Republican primary challenge to longtime incumbent Sen. Thad Cochran and supported Milton R. Wolf of Kansas in a Republican primary challenge to longtime incumbent Sen. Pat Roberts. Bevin, McDaniel, and Wolf all lost their primary elections. Overall, SCF-endorsed candidates won two of the six Senate races in which SCF invested in 2014; Ben Sasse was elected to the Senate from Nebraska and Joni Ernst was elected to the Senate from Iowa.

Former Virginia Attorney General Ken Cuccinelli became president of SCF in 2014.

Following the 2021 storming of the U.S. Capitol, SCF began raising money for Senator Josh Hawley of Missouri, who had been widely ostracized by corporate donors after accusations that he incited the violence, with SCF raising $700,000 and spending nearly $400,000 to send texts and emails in support of him.

In 2021, it was reported that the SCF spent nearly $90,000 on bulk purchases on a book published by Tom Cotton, as well as nearly $65,000 to Regnery Publishing for bulk purchases of Josh Hawley's forthcoming book.

=== House Conservatives Project ===
In 2013, SCF expanded its focus to include supporting conservative candidates for the U.S. House of Representatives through its House Conservatives Project. SCF Executive Director Matt Hoskins stated that part of the impetus for the Project was to "build a farm team for the Senate."

== See also ==
- Republican In Name Only
