= Stopping Trained in America PhDs From Leaving the Economy Act =

Jeff Flake, the U.S. representative for Arizona's 6th congressional district, introduced in 2009 the Stopping Trained in America PhDs From Leaving the Economy (STAPLE) Act (H.R. 1791). If passed, this act may remove numerical limits of US permanent residency and H-1B visas for graduates of doctoral degrees in science, technology, engineering, and mathematics (STEM) fields from US universities, who have job offers in such fields from US employers. Thus, such highly skilled persons may be able to get US green card more easily compared to others, and contribute to the US economy, including creating jobs for US citizens and permanent residents. The bill (H.R. 399) was reintroduced in 2011 and is referred to the Committee on the Judiciary. This idea was mentioned or alluded to favorably during the 2012 Republican primary and by President Obama in the 2012 State of the Union address. The bill has support from both sides of the aisle.
