= Dorothy Hogg =

Dorothy Hogg may refer to:

- Dorothy A. Hogg, United States Air Force lieutenant general and nurse
- Dorothy Hogg (jeweller) (1945–2022), artist, craftswoman, and teacher
