= Pedro N. Rivera =

United States general

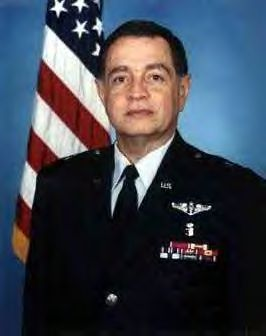
- Brigadier General Pedro N. Rivera; The first Hispanic to be named medical commander in the Air Force.
- Born: 1946; San German, Puerto Rico
- Died: May 23, 2023 (aged 76–77); Gloucester, Virginia, U.S.
- Military career
- Allegiance: United States of America
- Branch: United States Air Force
- Service years: 1974-1997
- Rank: Brigadier General
- Commands: Malcolm Grow Medical Clinic at Andrews Air Force Base; 81st Medical Support Squadron at Keesler Air Force Base
- Awards: Legion of Merit; Meritorious Service Medal with four oak leaf clusters

Pedro Nestor Rivera Lugo (September 1946 – 23 May 2023) was a United States Air Force officer who in 1994 became the first Hispanic to be named medical commander in the Air Force. He was responsible for the provision of health care to more than 50,000 patients.

== Early years ==
Rivera was born in San German, Puerto Rico, a city located on the western part of the island. He received his primary and secondary education at a Catholic private school, Colegio San Jose in his hometown. After graduation from high school, he became a student at the University of Puerto Rico at Mayagüez. There he joined the Beta chapter of Phi Sigma Alpha fraternity in 1964. In 1967, Rivera earned his Bachelor in Sciences degree with a concentration in Biology and Chemistry. He continued his academic education at the University of Puerto Rico School of Medicine where in 1971 he earned his Medical degree. He completed training as a Pediatrician at the University Hospital in Rio Piedras, Puerto Rico in 1974. During his residency he was appointed and served as Chief Resident in Pediatrics.

== Military career ==
In August 1974, Rivera joined the United States Air Force at the rank of captain and was assigned as staff pediatrician at Barksdale Air Force Base in Louisiana until May 1976, during which time he was promoted to major. He was then reassigned as staff pediatrician at Malcolm Grow Medical Clinic, Andrews Air Force Base in Maryland.

In September 1977, he was named chief of pediatric services of Malcolm Grow Medical Center and in March 1980, was named chairman of the Department of Pediatrics. On June 15 of that same year, he was promoted to lieutenant colonel. He served at Malcolm Grow until July 1983, when he was transferred to the U.S. Air Force Regional Hospital, MacDill Air Force Base, Florida as chief of hospital services. On September 20, 1984, Rivera was promoted to colonel, and in November 1984 he was named commander of the 56th Medical Group.

In May 1986, Rivera was reassigned to Headquarters Tactical Air Command at Langley Air Force Base in Virginia as deputy command surgeon and director of professional services. He served at Langley until May 1990, when he was sent to Bolling Air Force Base in Washington D.C. for one year, where he assumed the responsibilities of deputy director of medical plans and resources for the Office of the Surgeon General.

From September 1991 to June 1993, Rivera served as command surgeon at Headquarters Pacific Air Forces in Hickam Air Force Base in Hawaii; then from June 1993 to August 1994, as commander of the Malcolm Grow Medical Clinic at Andrews Air Force Base.

On August 1, 1994, Rivera was promoted to the rank of brigadier general and named commander of the 81st Medical Group at Keesler Air Force Base, Mississippi. As commander, he was responsible for the provision of health care to more than 50,000 patients in the Keesler area and for providing referral and consultative services for an additional 605,000 beneficiaries in a five state region (Department of Defense Region IV). His responsibilities included ensuring the availability of major war-and peacetime medical readiness response forces and also the direction of all managed health care activities in DoD Region IV.

Rivera was the director of five graduate medical education programs and extensive clinical research program by one of three Air Force clinical research laboratories. He led more than 2,000 health care professionals and managed a local budget of $179 million and a regional managed care contract of $3.8 billion. Rivera retired from the United States Air Force on October 1, 1997.

== Later years ==
Rivera was a licensed physician in the states of Louisiana, Mississippi and in the Commonwealth of Puerto Rico. After his retirement from the USAF he became the President for Government Services of PKC Corporation, a medical software corporation in Arlington Virginia. His final position prior to retirement was as medical director for Health Net Corporation where he was responsible for healthcare for military personnel and their immediate family members in a 23 states region in the Northeast of the United States. He was retired in Gloucester, Virginia. Pedro N. Rivera, MD, passed away peacefully on May 23, 2023.

== Military decorations and awards ==
Among Brigadier General Rivera's military decorations are the following:

Legion of Merit
Meritorious Service Medal with four oak leaf clusters
Distinguished Flying Cross
Combat Readiness Medal
National Defense Service Medal with one service star
Air Force Overseas Long Tour Service Ribbon
Air Force Longevity Service Award
Air Force Training Ribbon

Badges:

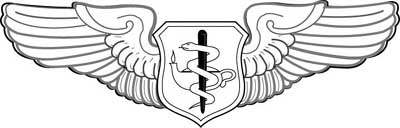
- Flight Surgeon Badge

== See also ==
- List of Puerto Ricans
- List of Puerto Rican military personnel
- University of Puerto Rico at Mayaguez people
