= United States Air Force Medical Service =

Combined medical corps of the USAF

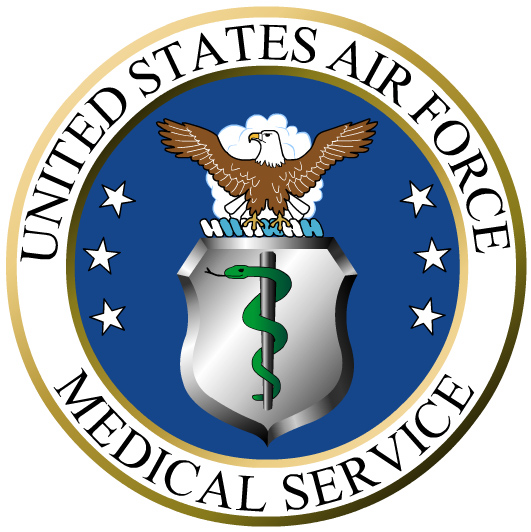
Seal of the Air Force Medical Service

The United States Air Force Medical Service (AFMS) consists of the five distinct medical corps of the Air Force and enlisted medical technicians. The AFMS was created in 1949 after the newly independent Air Force's first surgeon general, Maj. General Malcolm C. Grow (1887–1960), convinced the United States Army and President Harry S. Truman that the Air Force needed its own medical service.

In the summer of 1949, Air Force General Order No. 35 established a medical service with the following officer personnel components: Medical Corps, Dental Corps, Veterinary Corps, Medical Service Corps, Air Force Nurse Corps, and Women's Medical Specialist Corps.

The AFMS is led by The Surgeon General of the Air Force, who holds the rank of lieutenant general. The AFMS is found in all three components of the Air Force, including the Active Air Force, the U.S. Air Force Reserve, and the Air National Guard. Headquartered at the Air Staff, Defense Health Headquarters, Falls Church, Virginia, AFMS senior leaders can be found in all of the Major Commands and in the Pentagon.

The current surgeon general of the United States Air Force is Lieutenant General John DeGoes.

== Medical branches ==
=== Biomedical Sciences Corps ===
Established in 1965 from the defunct Women's Medical Specialist Corps and components of the Medical Service Corps, the Biomedical Sciences Corps (BSC) consists entirely of commissioned officers. This is the most diversified of the Medical Corps, consisting of members in Physical Therapy, Optometry, Podiatry, Physician Assistant, Audiology/Speech pathology, Psychology, Social Worker, Occupational Therapy, Aerospace physiology, Biomedical Scientists, Clinical Dietitian, Bioenvironmental Engineering, Public Health Officers, Entomology, Pharmacy, Medical lab Officers, and Health Physicists. The Chief of the Biomedical Sciences Corps is a brigadier general.

=== Dental Corps ===
Dental laboratory technicians receive an extensive specialized extended training at the US Air Force School Of Health Care Science. Graduates continue upgraded technical training throughout their career. Advanced courses include the production and technical understanding of complex dental and maxillofacial prosthetics. The Dental Corps consists of commissioned officers holding the Doctor of Dental Surgery degree or Doctor of Dental Medicine degree or a further, post-graduate degree. The current chief of the Dental Corps is brigadier general Sharon R. Bannister. The enlisted members of the USAF are assistants, technicians and prophylaxis technicians that train under licensed hygienists. The enlisted members are to support commissioned officers in different areas of the dental clinic. The enlisted members usually receive special training at certain bases that may have periodontist, oral surgeon, endodontist, orthodontist. After the first few years rotating in the clinic as an enlisted member, they can either become a prophylaxis technician which is a hygienist in the Air Force. Enlisted members also have the choices to work in other areas, such as DIPC, where instruments are cleaned, or front desk.

=== Medical Corps ===
The Medical Corps consists entirely of commissioned Air Force physicians, including holders of the Doctor of Medicine (MD) degree and the Doctor of Osteopathic Medicine (DO) degree. A member of the Medical Corps can also become a Flight Surgeon. The Chief of the Medical Corps is a brigadier general.

Physicians can enter service into the Air Force through several different paths. Cadets at the US Air Force Academy can compete for selection to medical school at the Uniformed Services University of the Health Sciences (USUHS) or at any CONUS medical school through HPSP. An academy graduate who attends USUHS will incur a twelve-year (seven for USUHS and five for the Academy) service commitment not counting any training such as residency and fellowship; an academy graduate who attends a civilian medical school will incur a nine-year service commitment not counting any training such as residency and fellowship. Civilian undergraduates can also apply to USUHS, they incur a seven-year service commitment. USUHS students are commissioned officers at the rank of Second Lieutenant (O-1) and are paid as full-time active duty members. All of their school and expenses are paid by the US Air Force. USUHS graduates must complete residency training in a military residency program. Civilian medical school students can apply for the Health Professions Scholarship Program (HPSP). HPSP medical students have their medical school tuition paid by the US Air Force and receive a monthly stipend for living expenses, but they are not on active duty. These graduates can usually attend a civilian or military residency training program and incur a three or four-year service commitment (one year commitment per year of scholarship assistance). Civilian resident physicians can enter Air Force service through the Financial Assistance Program (FAP). FAP physicians receive payment while in residency, but do not receive funds to pay for medical school. Unlike all other programs in the Air Force, they incur a service commitment of based on their length in the program, plus one year (e.g. two years in the program incurs a three-year service commitment). All graduates of residency training enter active duty at the rank of Captain (O-3). Most of the US Air Force Academy graduates pursue a career as an Air Force physician, while the vast majority of HPSP graduates leave the service as soon as their commitment is completed.

The Air Force also recruits fully trained and practicing physicians to enter active duty. Their rank at entry is based on their experience.

=== Medical Service Corps ===
The Medical Service Corps (MSC) consists entirely of commissioned officers. Members are required to hold a bachelor's or master's degree in Healthcare, Management, Economics, Finance, Operations Research, Business Administration or similar degree before receiving a commission, and must complete Basic Officer Training at Maxwell AFB, AL, and then a five-week military Health Services Administration (HSA) course at Fort Sam Houston, San Antonio, TX. MSCs serve as hospital administrators, resource management officers, directors of information systems/technology, managed care and patient administrators, group practice managers, medical logisticians, and medical readiness officers. MSC officers are also expected to become Board certified by one of several national healthcare administration organizations. This is usually done while the officer is in the rank of Captain or Major. The Chief of the Medical Service Corps is Brigadier General Alfred K. Flowers, Jr..

=== Nurse Corps ===
The Nurse Corps consists entirely of commissioned officers. New members of the Air Force Nurse Corps are required to hold at minimum a Bachelor of Science in Nursing degree prior to receiving a commission. Members of the Air Force Nurse Corps work in all aspects of Air Force Medicine and can serve as Flight Nurse in aeromedical evacuation missions, nurse practitioner, and nurse anesthetist. The first Chief of the Air Force Nurse Corps was Colonel Verena Marie Zeller (1949–56). The first two-star general Chief of the Air Force Nurse Corps was Major General Barbara Brannon; she was replaced in 2005 by Maj Gen Melissa Rank. In 2008, it was announced that Colonel Kimberly Siniscalchi would be promoted to the rank of major general and serve as the Chief of the AF Nurse Corps, thereby bypassing the rank of brigadier general (one-star).

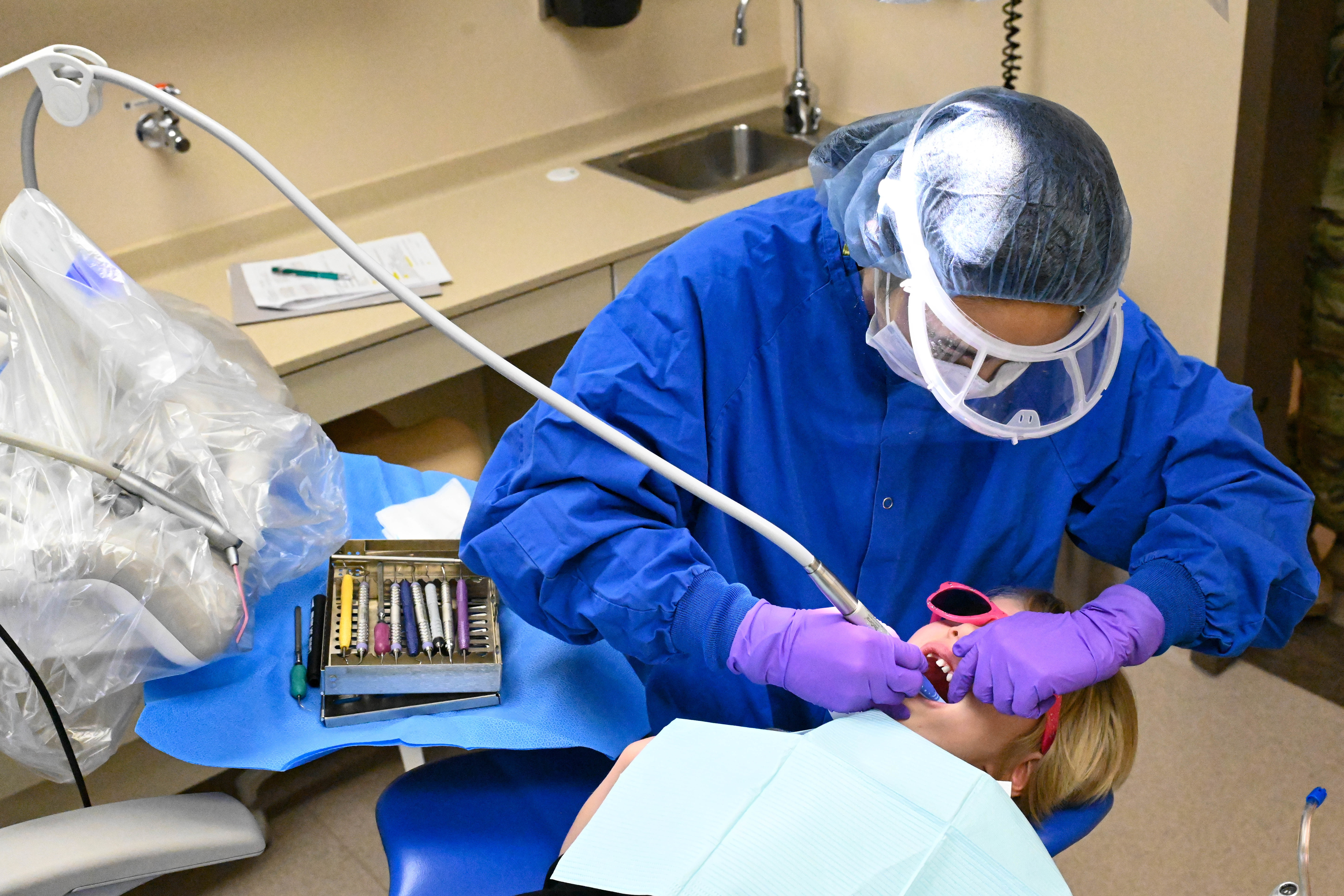
A U.S. Air Force dental technician from the 28th Medical Group cleans a child's teeth at Ellsworth Air Force Base, South Dakota, March 2023.

=== Enlisted Medics ===
Air Force Enlisted Medical personnel perform in over twenty different medical fields including medical administration, mental health, dental care, optometry, physical therapy, aeromedical evacuation, medical logistics, laboratory sciences, surgical care, emergency care, radiology, pharmacy, etc. but the generic medic in the Air Force, equivalent to a Combat Medic Specialist in the Army or a Hospital Corpsman in the Navy, is known as an Aerospace Medical Service Technician or med tech for short. Enlisted medics are led by a Chief Master Sergeant.

== Badges ==
Medical Corps Badge

Enlisted Medical Badge

Biomedical Science Corps Badge

Nurse Corps Badge

Dental Corps Badge

Medical Service Corps Badge

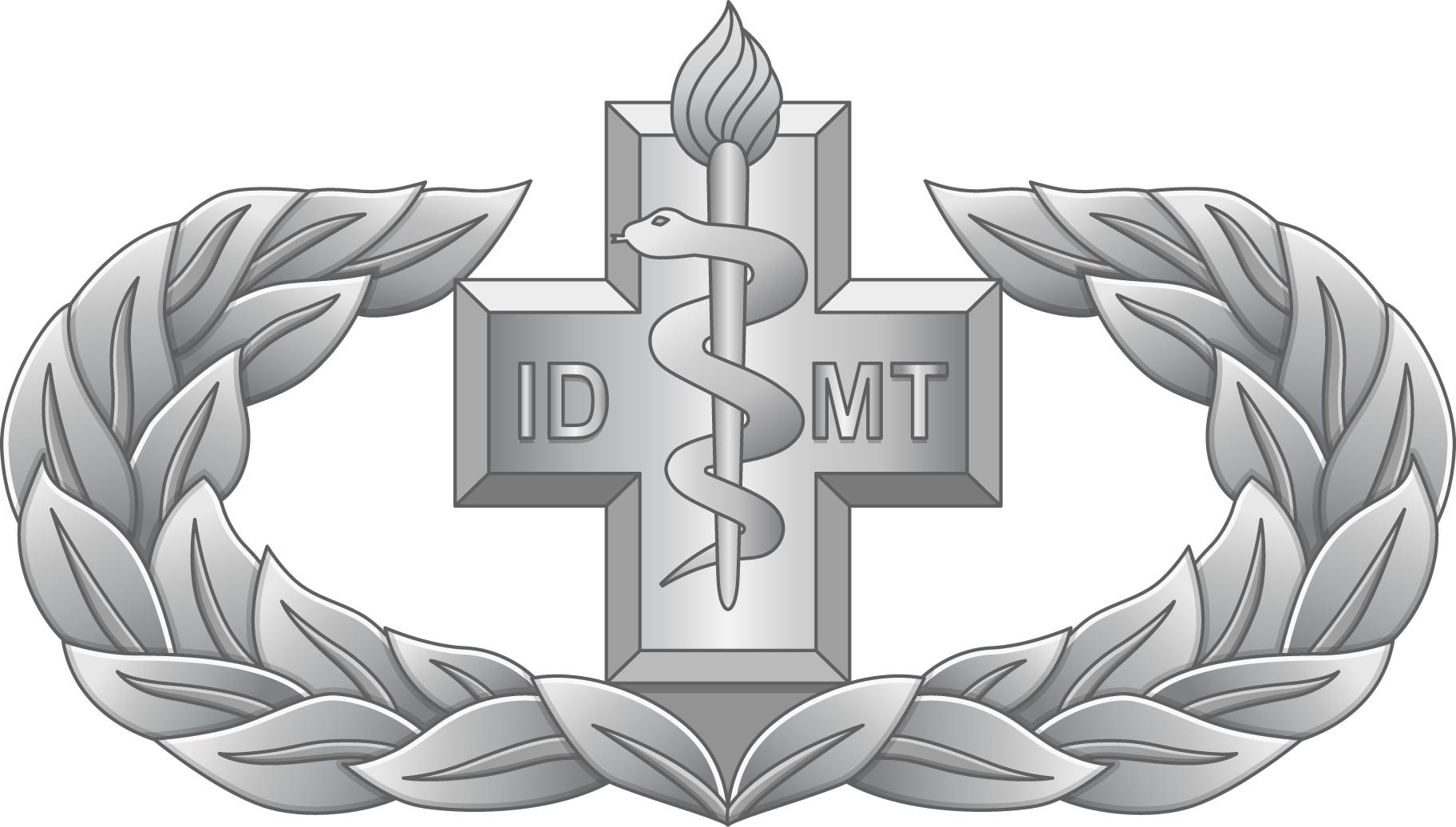
Independent Duty Medical Technician Badge

Flight Surgeon Badge

Flight Nurse Badge

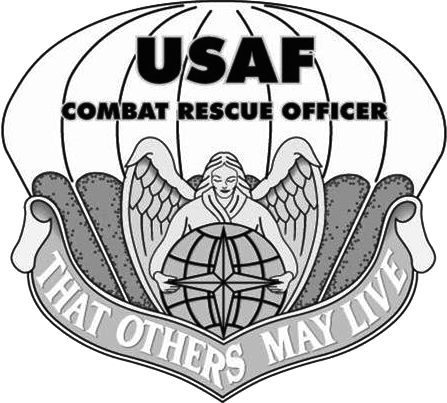
Combat Rescue Officer Crest

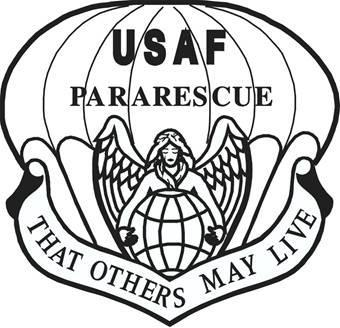
Pararescueman Crest

== Units ==
- AFMS Eurasia
  - 423rd Medical Squadron, RAF Alconbury
  - 31st Medical Group, Aviano Air Base
  - 422nd Medical Squadron, RAF Croughton
  - 39th Medical Group, Incirlik Air Base
  - 48th Medical Group, RAF Lakenheath
  - 86th Medical Group, Ramstein Air Base
  - 52nd Medical Group, Spangdahlem Air Base
- AFMS North
  - 11th Medical Group, Joint Base Andrews
  - 11th Medical Squadron, Joint Base Anacostia-Bolling
  - 436th Medical Group, Dover Air Force Base
  - 66th Medical Squadron, Hanscom Air Force Base
  - 633rd Medical Group, Joint Base Langley-Eustis
  - 87th Medical Group, Joint Base McGuire-Dix-Lakehurst
  - 43rd Medical Squadron, Pope Field
  - 375th Medical Group, Scott Air Force Base
  - 4th Medical Group, Seymour Johnson Air Force Base
  - 88th Medical Group, Wright-Patterson Air Force Base
- AFMS Pacific
  - 36th Medical Group, Anderson Air Force Base
  - 18th Medical Group, Kadena Air Base
  - 8th Medical Group, Kunsan Air Base
  - 15th Medical Group, Joint Base Pearl Harbor Hickam
  - 35th Medical Group, Misawa Air Base
  - 51st Medical Group, Osan Air Base
  - 374th Medical Group, Yokota Air Base
- AFMS South
  - 97th Medical Group, Altus Air Force Base
  - 2nd Medical Group, Barksdale Air Force Base
  - 628th Medical Group, Joint Base Charleston
  - 14th Medical Group, Columbus Air Force Base
  - 7th Medical Group, Dyess Air Force Base
  - 96th Medical Group, Eglin Air Force Base
  - 17th Medical Group, Goodfellow Air Force Base
  - 1st Medical Group, Hurlburt Field
  - 81st Medical Group, Keesler Air Force Base
  - 59th Medical Wing, Joint Base San Antonio-Lackland
  - 47th Medical Group, Laughlin Air Force Base
  - 19th Medical Group, Little Rock Air Force Base
  - 6th Medical Group, MacDill Air Force Base
  - 42nd Medical Group, Maxwell Air Force Base
  - 23rd Medical Group, Moody Air Force Base
  - 45th Medical Group, Patrick Air Force Base
  - 59th Medical Group, Randolph Air Force Base
  - 78th Medical Group, Robins Air Force Base
  - 20th Medical Group, Shaw Air Force Base
  - 82nd Medical Group, Sheppard Air Force Base
  - 72nd Medical Group, Tinker Air Force Base
  - 325th Medical Group, Tyndall Air Force BASE
  - 71st Medical Group, Vance Air Force Base
- AFMS West
  - 9th Medical Group, Beale Air Force Base
  - 460th Medical Group, Buckley Space Force Base
  - 27th Special Operations Medical Group, Cannon Air Force Base
  - 355th Medical Group, Davis-Monthan Air Force Base
  - 412th Medical Group, Edwards Air Force Base
  - 354 Medical Group, Eielson Air Force Base
  - 673rd Medical Group, Joint Base Elmendorf-Richardson
  - 28th Medical Group, Ellsworth Air Force Base
  - 92nd Medical Group, Fairchild Air Force Base
  - 90th Medical Group, Francis E. Warren Air Force Base
  - 319th Medical Group, Grand Forks Air Force Base
  - 15th Medical Group, Joint Base Peral Harbor-Hickam
  - 75th Medical Group, Hill Air Force Base
  - 49th Medical Group, Holloman Air Force Base
  - 377th Medical Group, Kirtland Air Force Base
  - 62nd Medical Squadron, Joint Base Lewis-McChord
  - 61st Medical Squadron, Los Angeles Air Force Base
  - 56th Medical Group, Luke Air Force Base
  - 61st Medical Squadron, Fort MacArthur
  - 341st Medical Group, Malmstrom Air Force Base
  - 22nd Medical Group, McConnell Air Force Base
  - 5th Medical Group, Minot Air Force Base
  - 366th Medical Group, Mountain Home Air Force Base
  - 99th Medical Group, Nellis Air Force Base
  - 55th Medical Group, Offutt Air Force Base
  - 21st Medical Group, Peterson Air Force Base
  - 21st Medical Squadron, Schriever Air Force Base
  - 60th Medical Group, Travis Air Force Base
  - 10th Medical Group, USAF Academy
  - 30th Medical Group, Vandenberg Air Force Base
  - 509th Medical Group, Whiteman Air Force Base

== See also ==
In general

- Exceptional Family Member Program
- Edward H. White II Museum of Aerospace Medicine
- Military medicine
- Battlefield medicine

Dental corps

- Army Dental Corps
- Navy Dental Corps

Medical corps

- U.S. Army Medical Corps
- U.S. Navy Medical Corps

Medical service corps

- Medical Service Corps (U.S. Army)
- Medical Specialist Corps (U.S. Army)
- Medical Service Corps (U.S. Navy)

Nurse corps

- U.S. Army Nurse Corps
- U.S. Navy Nurse Corps
- Angels of Bataan

Enlisted medics

- 68W (medic; U.S. Army)
- Hospital Corpsman (U.S. Navy)
- Hospital Corpsman Prayer
- Combat medic
- Flight medic
- Medic
- Medical assistant
- Ambulance#Military use

Other Medical

- US Navy Bureau of Medicine and Surgery
- United States Army Medical Command
