= Sharon Bannister =

U.S. Air Force general

Sharon R. Bannister
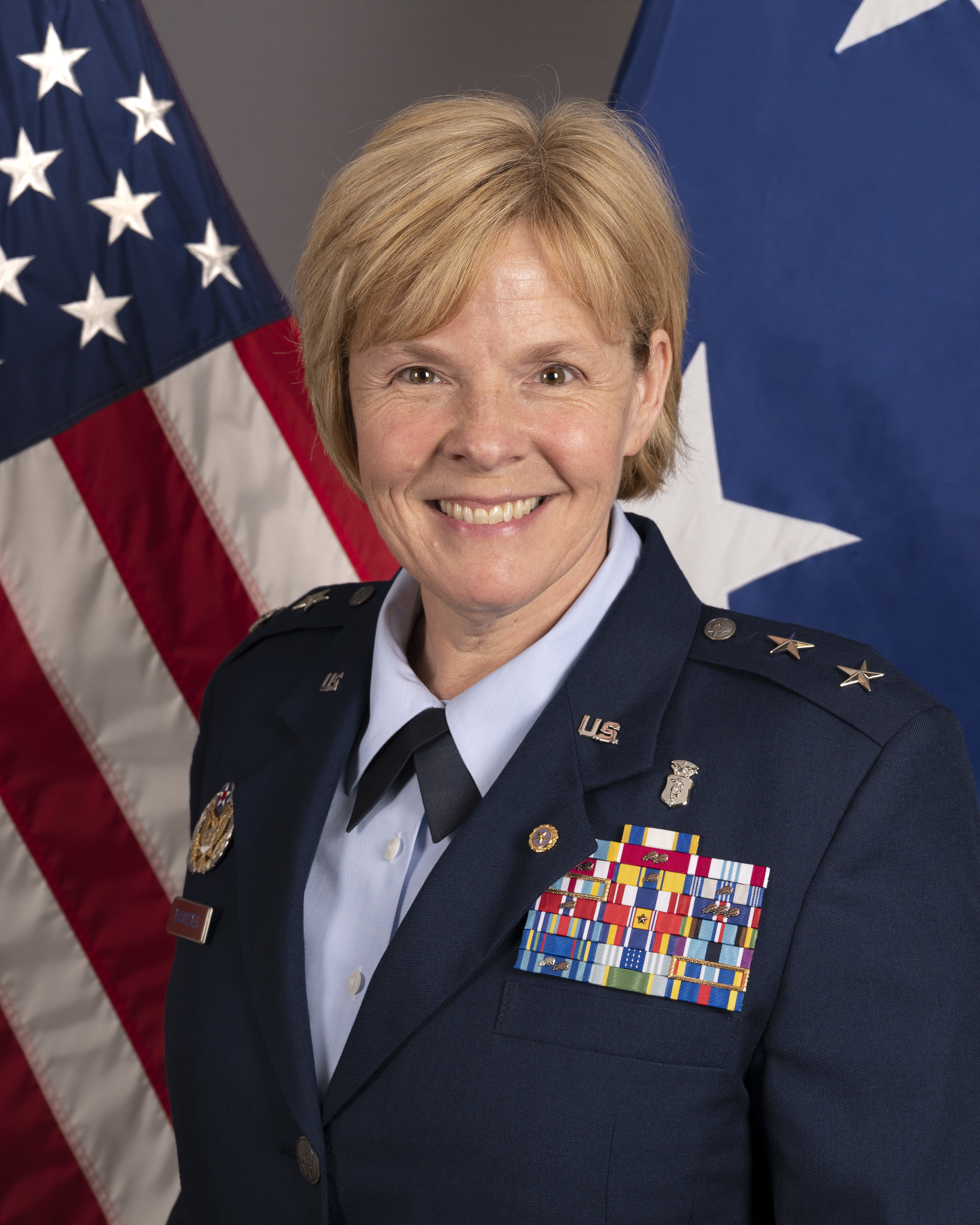
- Military career
- Allegiance: United States
- Branch: United States Air Force
- Service years: 1992–2023
- Rank: Major general
- Commands: 79th Medical Wing; 436th Medical Group; 6th Dental Squadron
- Awards: Air Force Distinguished Service Medal (2); Defense Superior Service Medal; Legion of Merit (3)
- Other work: President of the American Academy of Periodontology Foundation

Sharon Bannister is a retired United States Air Force major general and dentist who last served as director of medical operations of the Office of the Surgeon General of the United States Air Force. She previously served as command surgeon of Air Combat Command.

Military offices
Preceded by James H. Dienst	Deputy Assistant Director for Education and Training of the Defense Health Agency; 2018–2019	Succeeded by Anita L. Fligge
Preceded by Paul A. Friedrichs	Command Surgeon of the Air Combat Command; 2019–2021	Succeeded by Robert K. Bogart
Preceded by Robert I. Miller	Director of Medical Operations of the United States Air Force; 2021–2023	Vacant
