= James G. Roudebush =

American military general

LtGen (Dr.) James G. Roudebush
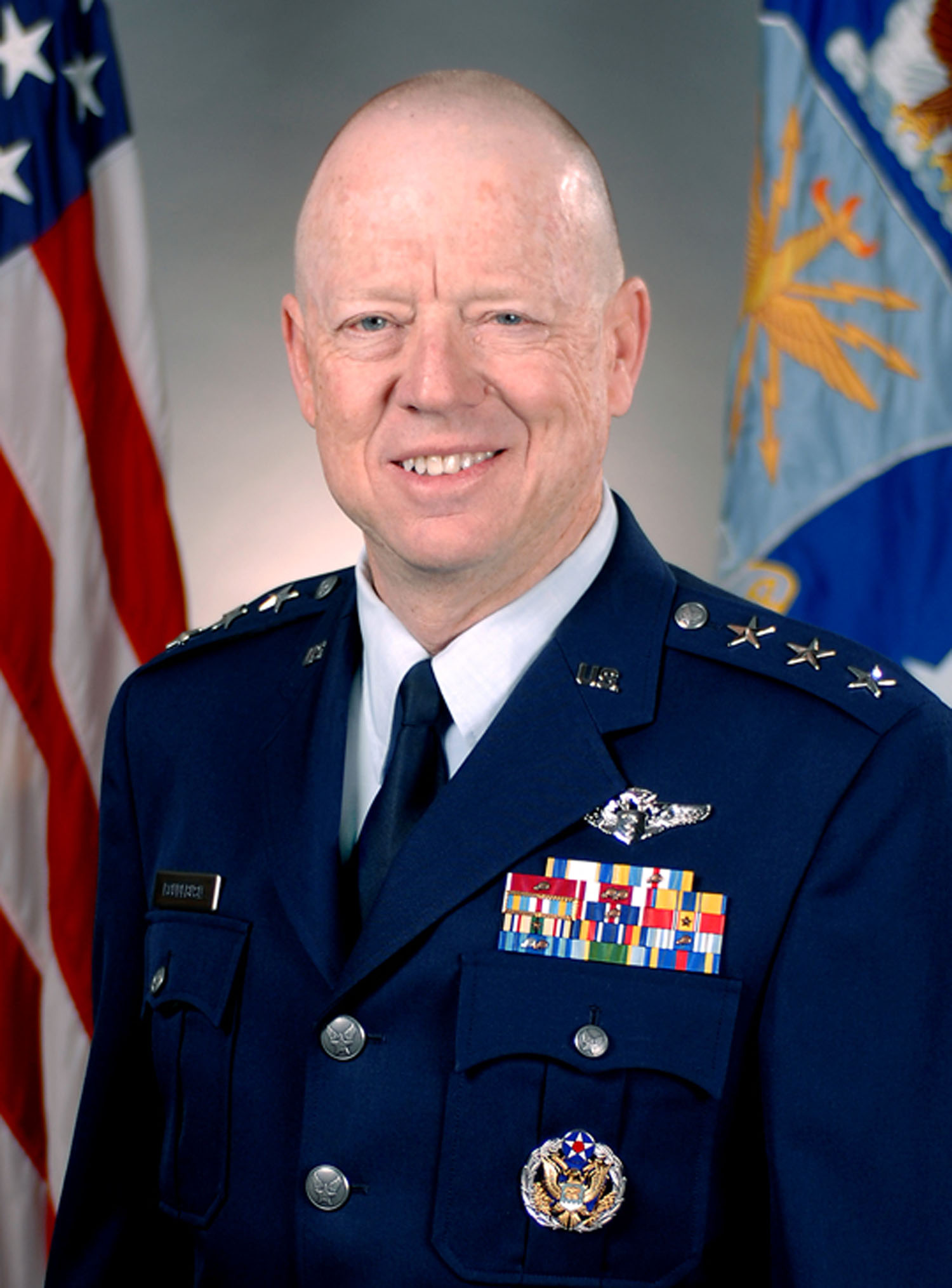
- 19th Surgeon General of the USAF
- Born: February 24, 1948 (age 78)
- Military career
- Allegiance: United States
- Branch: United States Air Force
- Service years: 1972–2009
- Rank: Lieutenant General
- Awards: Defense Superior Service Medal (2); Legion of Merit (2); Meritorious Service Medal (3); Air Force Commendation Medal; National Defense Service Medal; Southwest Asia Service Medal

Lieutenant General James Gordon Roudebush, USAF, (born February 24, 1948) was the 19th Surgeon General of the United States Air Force, Headquarters U.S. Air Force, Washington, D.C. General Roudebush served as functional manager of the U.S. Air Force Medical Service. In this capacity, he advised the Secretary of the Air Force and Air Force Chief of Staff, as well as the Assistant Secretary of Defense for Health Affairs on matters pertaining to the medical aspects of the air expeditionary force and the health of Air Force people. General Roudebush had authority to commit resources worldwide for the Air Force Medical Service, to make decisions affecting the delivery of medical services, and to develop plans, programs and procedures to support worldwide medical service missions. He exercised direction, guidance and technical management of more than 42,400 people assigned to 74 medical facilities worldwide.

A native of Gering, Nebraska, Roudebush entered the Air Force in 1975 after receiving a Bachelor of Medicine degree from the University of Nebraska–Lincoln, and a Doctor of Medicine degree from the University of Nebraska College of Medicine. He completed residency training in family practice at the Wright-Patterson Air Force Medical Center, Ohio, in 1978, and aerospace medicine at Brooks Air Force Base, Texas, in 1984. He commanded a wing clinic and wing hospital before becoming Deputy Commander of the Air Force Materiel Command Human Systems Center. He has served as Command Surgeon for U.S. Central Command, Pacific Air Forces, U.S. Transportation Command and Headquarters Air Mobility Command. Prior to his selection as the 19th Surgeon General, he served as the Deputy Surgeon General of the U.S. Air Force. He retired from the U.S. Air Force on October 1, 2009.

== Education ==
1971 Bachelor of Medicine degree, University of Nebraska–Lincoln
1975 Doctor of Medicine degree, University of Nebraska College of Medicine
1978 Residency training in family practice, Wright-Patterson USAF Medical Center, Wright-Patterson AFB, Ohio
1980 Aerospace Medicine Primary Course, Brooks AFB, Texas
1981 Tri-Service Combat Casualty Care Course, Fort Sam Houston, Texas
1983 Master's of Public Health, University of Texas School of Public Health, San Antonio
1984 Residency in aerospace medicine, Brooks AFB, Texas
1988 Air War College, by seminar
1989 Institute for Federal Health Care Executives, George Washington University, Washington, D.C.
1992 National War College, Fort Lesley J. McNair, Washington, D.C.
1993 Executive Management Course, Defense Systems Management College, Fort Belvoir, Virginia

== Assignments ==
1. July 1975 – July 1978, resident in family practice, Wright-Patterson USAF Medical Center, Wright-Patterson AFB, Ohio
2. July 1978 – September 1982, physician in family practice and flight surgeon, USAF Hospital, Francis E. Warren AFB, Wyoming
3. October 1982 – July 1984, resident in aerospace medicine, USAF School of Aerospace Medicine, Brooks AFB, Texas
4. August 1984 – September 1986, Chief of Aerospace Medicine, 81st Tactical Fighter Wing, Royal Air Force Bentwaters, England
5. September 1986 – July 1988, Commander, USAF Clinic, 81st Tactical Fighter Wing, Royal Air Force Bentwaters, England
6. August 1988 – June 1991, Commander, 36th Tactical Fighter Wing Hospital, Bitburg Air Base, Germany
7. August 1991 – July 1992, student, National War College, Fort Lesley J. McNair, Washington, D.C.
8. August 1992 – March 1994, Vice Commander, Human Systems Center, Brooks AFB, Texas
9. March 1994 – January 1997, Command Surgeon, U.S. Central Command, MacDill AFB, Florida
10. February 1997 – June 1998, Command Surgeon, Pacific Air Forces, Hickam AFB, Hawaii
11. July 1998 – July 2000, Commander, 89th Medical Group, Andrews AFB, Maryland
12. July 2000 – June 2001, Command Surgeon, U.S. Transportation Command and Headquarters Air Mobility Command, Scott AFB, Illinois
13. July 2001 – July 2006, Deputy Surgeon General, Headquarters U.S. Air Force, Bolling AFB, Washington, D.C.
14. August 2006 – August 2009, Surgeon General, Headquarters U.S. Air Force, Washington, D.C.

== Flight information ==
Rating: Chief flight surgeon
Flight hours: More than 1,100
Aircraft flown: C-5, C-9, C-21, C-130, EC-135, F-15, F-16, H-53, KC-135, KC-10, T-37, T-38, UH-1 and UH-60

== Awards and decorations ==
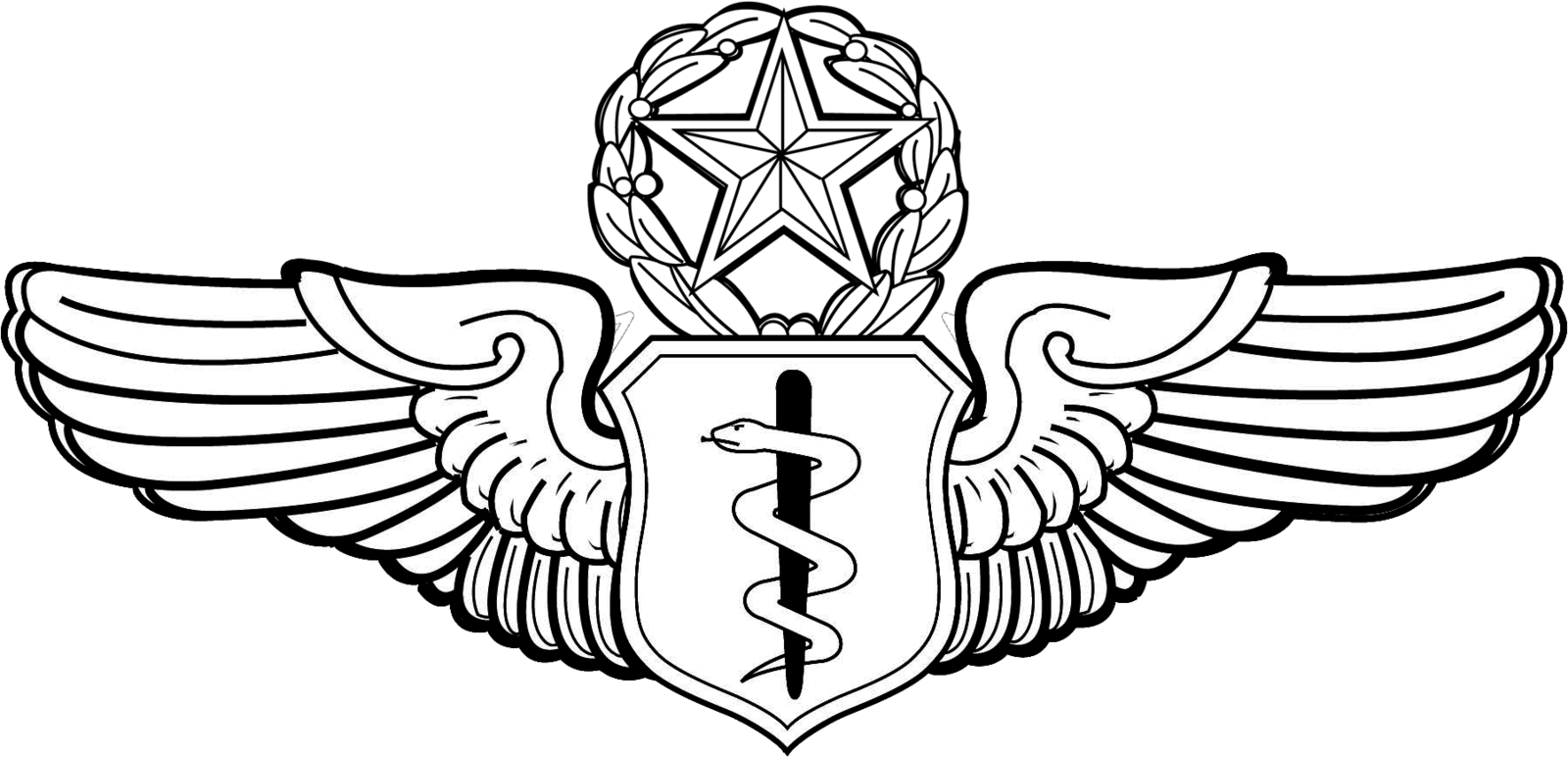
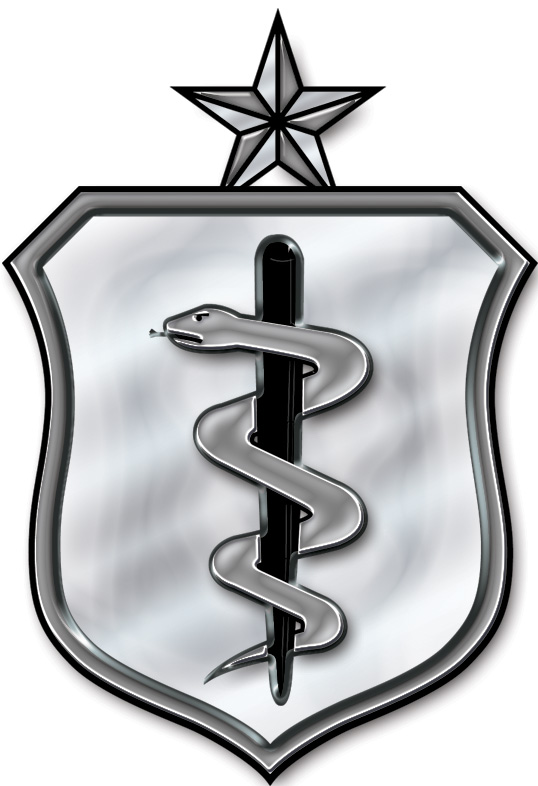
| Air Force Chief Flight Surgeon Badge |
| Air Force Chief Physician Badge |
| Headquarters Air Force Badge |

| Air Force Distinguished Service Medal with one bronze oak leaf cluster |
| Defense Superior Service Medal with oak leaf cluster |
| Legion of Merit with oak leaf cluster |
| Meritorious Service Medal with two oak leaf clusters |
| Air Force Commendation Medal |
| Joint Meritorious Unit Award |
| Air Force Outstanding Unit Award with oak leaf cluster |
| National Defense Service Medal with two bronze service stars |
| Southwest Asia Service Medal with bronze service star |
| Global War on Terrorism Service Medal |
| Air Force Overseas Long Tour Service Ribbon with oak leaf cluster |
| Air Force Longevity Service Award with silver and three bronze oak leaf clusters |
| Small Arms Expert Marksmanship Ribbon |
| Air Force Training Ribbon |

== Effective dates of promotion ==
Promotions
| Insignia | Rank | Date |
|---|---|---|
| | Lieutenant General | August 4, 2006 |
| | Major General | May 24, 2001 |
| | Brigadier General | July 1, 1998 |
| | Colonel | January 31, 1991 |
| | Lieutenant Colonel | December 8, 1985 |
| | Major | December 8, 1979 |
| | Captain | May 15, 1975 |
| | First Lieutenant | May 15, 1974 |
| | Second Lieutenant | May 15, 1972 |

== Professional memberships and associations ==
Society of USAF Flight Surgeons
Aerospace Medical Association
International Association of Military Flight Surgeon Pilots
Association of Military Surgeons of the United States
Air Force Association
American College of Preventive Medicine
American College of Physician Executives
American Medical Association

| Preceded by George P. Taylor | Surgeon General of the United States Air Force; 2006–2009 | Succeeded by Charles B. Green |
