= Paul A. Friedrichs =

U.S. Air Force general

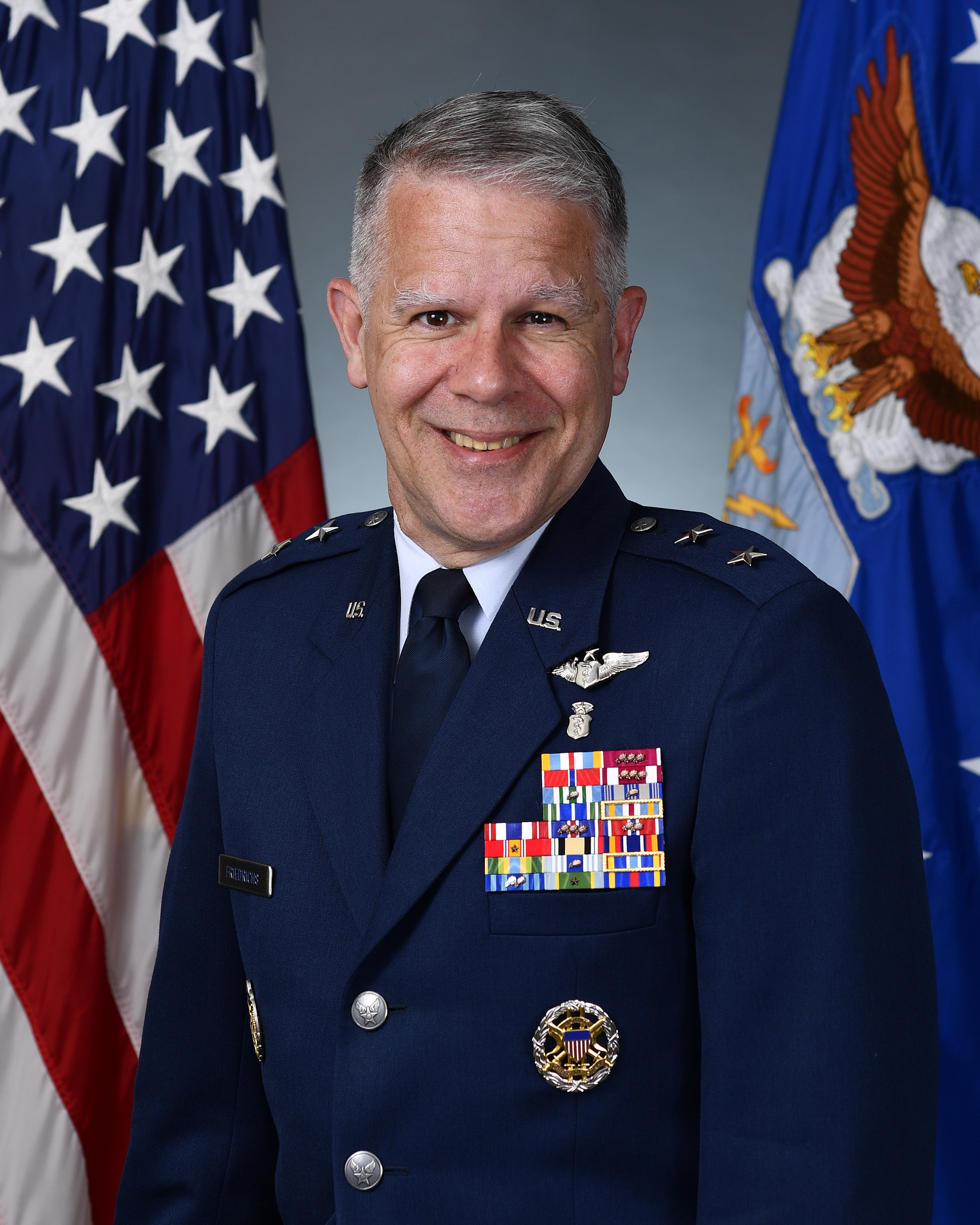
- Military career
- Allegiance: United States
- Branch: United States Air Force
- Service years: 1986–2023
- Rank: Major General
- Commands: 673rd Medical Group; 3rd Medical Group; 56th Medical Operations Squadron
- Conflicts: Iraq War
- Awards: Defense Superior Service Medal; Legion of Merit (4); Bronze Star Medal

Paul A. Friedrichs is a retired United States Air Force major general who last served as the command surgeon of the Joint Staff. He previously served as command surgeon of Air Combat Command.

Friedrichs retired from active duty in June 2023. He now serves as the senior director for global health security and biodefense on the National Security Council, and will be appointed as the inaugural head of a new government agency, the Office of Pandemic Preparedness and Response Policy effective August 7, 2023.

== Assignments ==
1. June 1990 – June 1991, Surgical Intern, Wilford Hall Medical Center, Lackland AFB, Texas
2. July 1991 – June 1992, General Medical Officer, Wilford Hall Medical Center, Lackland AFB, Texas
3. June 1992 – June 1997, Urological Surgery Resident, Wilford Hall Medical Center, Lackland AFB, Texas
4. July 1997 – October 1997, Assistant Chief, Urology, 89th MDG, Andrews AFB, Md.
5. November 1997 – September 1999, Chief, Urology, 89th MDG, Andrews AFB, Md.
6. October 1999 – September 2000, Chief, Population Health Management, 89th MDG, Andrews AFB, Md.
7. October 2000 – July 2001, Analyst, Health Benefits and Policy Division, Office of the Surgeon General, Headquarters Air Force, Bolling AFB, Washington, D.C.
8. August 2001 – June 2002, Chief, Operations Branch, Office of the Surgeon General, Headquarters Air Force, Bolling AFB, Washington, D.C.
9. July 2002 – May 2003, Chief, Optimization and Integration Division, Air Force Medical Operations Agency (AFMOA), Bolling AFB, Washington, D.C.
10. May 2003 – May 2005, Commander, 56th Medical Operations Squadron, Luke AFB, Ariz. (September 2004 – January 2005, Commander, 332nd Expeditionary Aeromedical Operations Squadron, Balad Air Base, Iraq)
11. June 2005 – April 2006, Chief, Aeromedical and Clinical Services Branches, Headquarters Air Force Space Command, Peterson AFB, Colo.
12. May 2006 – July 2007, Chief, Medical Operations Division, Headquarters Air Force Space Command, Peterson AFB, Colo.
13. August 2007 – June 2008, Student, National War College, Fort McNair, Washington, D.C.
14. August 2008 – July 2010, Commander, 3rd Medical Group, 3rd Wing, Elmendorf AFB, Alaska
15. July 2010 – July 2011, Commander, 673d Medical Group, 673rd Air Base Wing, JB Elmendorf-Richardson, Alaska
16. July 2011 – July 2014, Command Surgeon, HQ Pacific Air Forces, JB Pearl Harbor- Hickam, Hawaii
17. July 2014 – June 2016, Vice Commander, AFMOA, JB San Antonio, Lackland, Texas
18. January 2015 – June 2015, Chair, Joint Task Force on High Reliability Organizations, Office of the Assistance Secretary of Defense for Health Affairs, Washington, D.C.
19. June 2016 – July 2018, Command Surgeon, US Transportation Command, Scott AFB, Ill.
20. July 2018– July 2019, Air Combat Command (ACC), Command Surgeon, JB Langley-Eustis, Va.
21. July 2019–present, Joint Staff Surgeon, the Pentagon, Arlington, Va.

== Effective dates of promotion ==
Insignia	Rank	Date
	Major general	May 12, 2021
	Brigadier general	June 2, 2018
	Colonel	May 29, 2007
	Lieutenant colonel	May 19, 2002
	Major	May 19, 1996
	Captain	May 19, 1990
	First lieutenant	Never held
	Second lieutenant	May 17, 1986

Military offices
Preceded by ???	Command Surgeon of the United States Transportation Command; 2016–2018	Succeeded by John R. Andrus
Preceded by Sean L. Murphy	Command Surgeon of the Air Combat Command; 2018–2019	Succeeded by Sharon Bannister
Preceded by Joseph Caravalho	Joint Staff Surgeon; 2019–2023	Succeeded by John R. Andrus
