= Robert I. Miller =

U.S. Air Force Lieutenant general

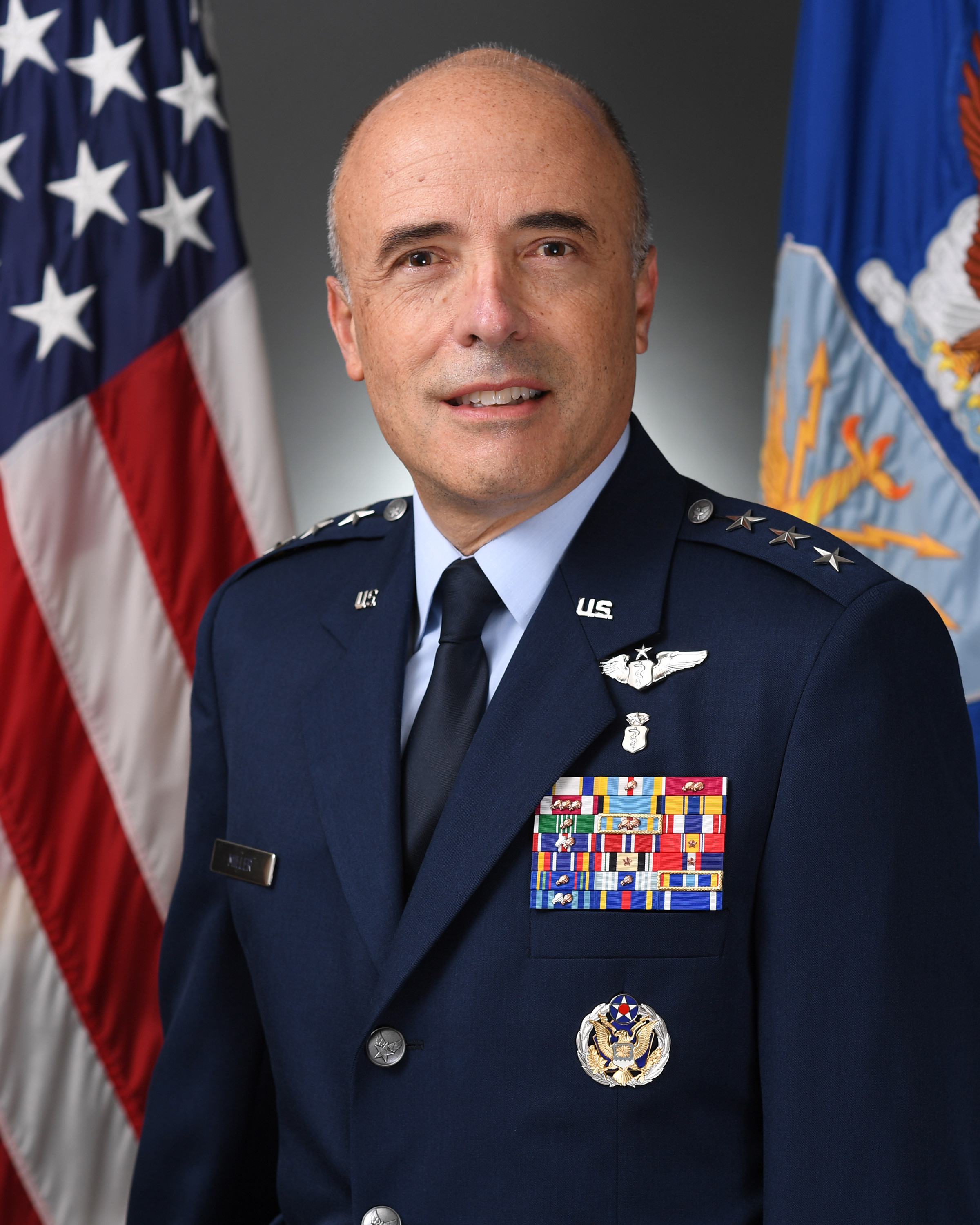
- Military career
- Allegiance: United States
- Branch: United States Air Force
- Service years: 1989–2024
- Rank: Lieutenant General
- Commands: Surgeon General of the United States Air Force; Air Force Medical Operations Agency; 779th Medical Group; 48th Medical Group
- Conflicts: Iraq War
- Awards: Air Force Distinguished Service Medal; Defense Superior Service Medal (2); Legion of Merit (3)
- Robert I. Miller's voice Miller's opening statement at a Senate Appropriations Defense Subcommittee hearing on military health programs Recorded March 7, 2023

Robert Irving Miller is a medical surgeon and retired United States Air Force lieutenant general who last served as the 24th Surgeon General of the United States Air Force and United States Space Force.

He currently serves as Executive Director of Military Health Institute and Clinical Professor in the Department of Pediatrics at University of Texas Health Science Center at San Antonio.

He previously served as the Director of Medical Operations of the United States Air Force and prior to that, as Commander of the Air Force Medical Operations Agency. On April 13, 2021, Miller was nominated to be the next Surgeon General of the United States Air Force and the United States Space Force. The nomination was confirmed by voice vote of the United States Senate on May 26, 2021, and he assumed the assignment on June 4, 2021.

== Early life and education ==
He earned Bachelor of Arts in Biology and Chemistry from Washington & Jefferson College in 1985 and then earned Doctor of Medicine from Uniformed Services University of the Health Sciences in 1989.

He then earned Master of Strategic Studies from USAF Air War College in 2005 and then a Master of Business Administration from Isenberg School of Management at University of Massachusetts Amherst in 2006.

== Effective dates of promotions ==
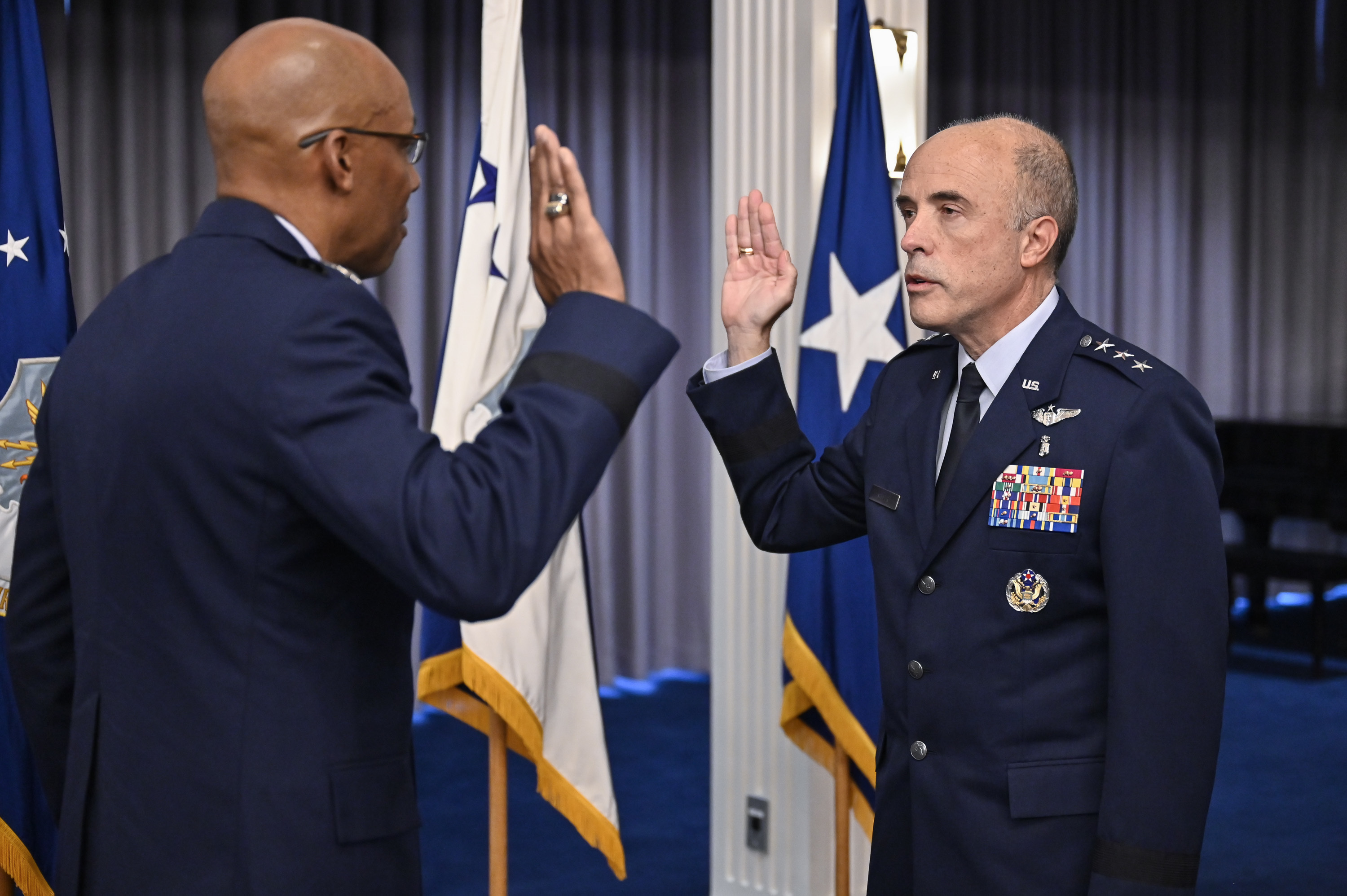
Miller is administered his oath of office as the surgeon general of the Air Force by General Charles Q. Brown Jr., chief of staff of the Air Force, during his promotion ceremony on June 4, 2021.

Rank	Date
Captain	May 20, 1989
Major	May 20, 1995
Lieutenant Colonel	May 31, 2000
Colonel	May 29, 2004
Brigadier General	November 2, 2015
Major General	July 3, 2018
Lieutenant General	June 4, 2021

== Awards and decorations ==
- Air Force Distinguished Service Medal with oak leaf cluster
- Defense Superior Service Medal with oak leaf cluster
- Legion of Merit with two oak leaf clusters
- Meritorious Service Medal with three oak leaf clusters
- Aerial Achievement Medal
- Air Force Commendation Medal
- Army Commendation Medal with oak leaf cluster

Military offices
Preceded by William M. Roberts	Commandant of the Medical Education and Training Campus; 2014–2016	Succeeded by James Dienst; Acting
Preceded by Lee E. Payne	Commander of the Air Force Medical Operations Agency; 2016–2020	Succeeded by James Dienst
Preceded by Roosevelt Allen	Director of Medical Operations of the United States Air Force; 2020–2021	Succeeded by Sharon Bannister
Preceded by Dorothy A. Hogg	Surgeon General of the United States Air Force and United States Space Force; 2021–2024	Succeeded by John DeGoes
