= Mark A. Ediger =

Twenty-second Surgeon General of the United States Air Force

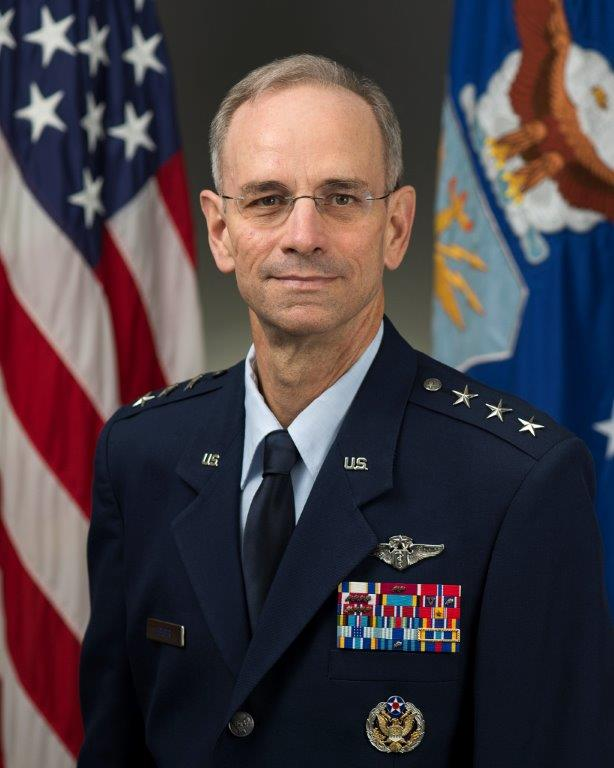
- Lieutenant General Mark A. Ediger; 22nd USAF Surgeon General (2015–2018)
- Born: Springfield, Missouri
- Military career
- Allegiance: United States
- Branch: United States Air Force
- Service years: 1985–2018
- Rank: Lieutenant general
- Commands: U.S. Air Force Surgeon General

Mark A. Ediger is a retired lieutenant general in the United States Air Force who was the twenty-second Surgeon General of the United States Air Force. Prior to that he served as the Deputy Surgeon General.

== Education ==
- 1977 Bachelor's degree in chemistry, University of Missouri, Kansas City
- 1978 Doctor of Medicine degree, University of Missouri, Kansas City
- 1981 Residency in family practice, Wake Forest University, Winston-Salem, N.C.
- 1991 Master of Public Health degree, UTHealth School of Public Health, San Antonio

== Assignments ==
1. June 1986 – August 1988, Chief, Family Practice, Air Transportable Hospital Commander, 1st Medical Group, Langley AFB, Va.

2. August 1988 – July 1990, Flight Surgeon and Chief, Flight Medicine, 94th Fighter Squadron, Langley AFB, Va.

3. July 1990 – July 1992, Resident in Aerospace Medicine, USAF School of Aerospace Medicine, Brooks AFB, Texas

4. July 1992 – July 1994, Chief, Aeromedical Services, 325th Medical Group, Tyndall AFB, Fla.

5. July 1994 – July 1996, Chief, Aerospace Medicine Branch, and Chief, Professional Services Division, Headquarters Air Education and Training Command, Randolph AFB, Texas

6. July 1996 – July 1998, Chief, Aerospace Medicine Division, Air Force Medical Operations Agency, Bolling AFB, D.C.

7. July 1998 – July 2000, Command Surgeon, Air Force Special Operations Command, Hurlburt Field, Fla.

8. July 2000 – June 2002, Commander, 16th Medical Group, Hurlburt Field, Fla.

9. June 2002 – July 2003, Commander, 363rd Expeditionary Medical Group, Southwest Asia

10. July 2003 – July 2007, Command Surgeon, Headquarters U.S. Air Forces in Europe, Ramstein Air Base, Germany

11. July 2007 – September 2008, Command Surgeon, Headquarters Air Education and Training Command, Randolph AFB, Texas

12. September 2008 – July 2012, Commander, Air Force Medical Operations Agency, Lackland AFB, Texas

13. July 2012 – June 2015, Deputy Surgeon General, Headquarters U.S. Air Force, Washington, D.C.

14. June 2015 – June 2018, Surgeon General, Headquarters U.S. Air Force, Washington, D.C.

== Awards and decorations ==
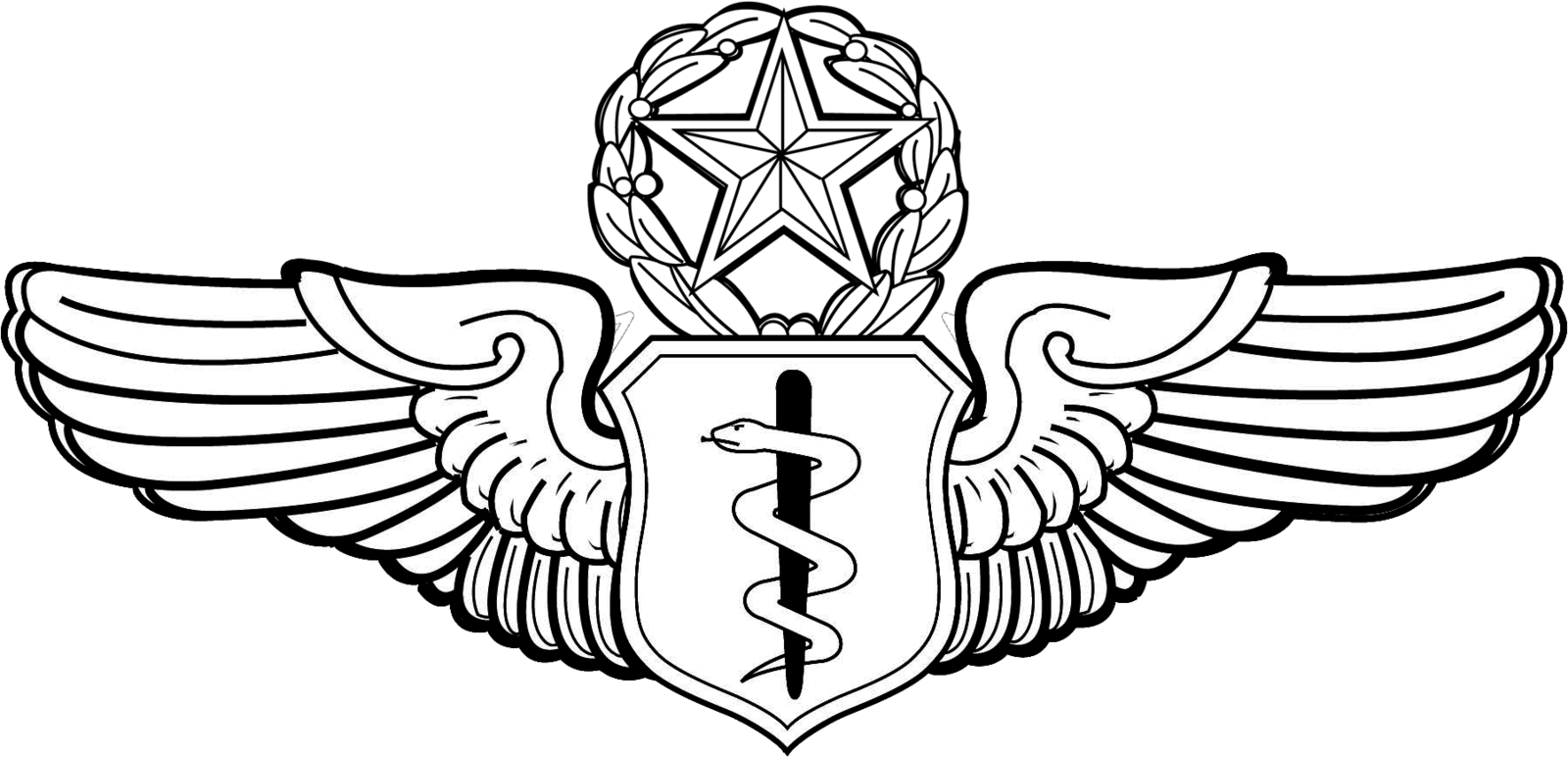
U.S. Air Force Chief Flight Surgeon Badge
Headquarters Air Force Badge

Air Force Distinguished Service Medal with one bronze oak leaf cluster
Legion of Merit with two oak leaf clusters
Bronze Star Medal
Meritorious Service Medal with four oak leaf clusters
Aerial Achievement Medal
Air Force Outstanding Unit Award with Valor device and silver oak leaf cluster
Air Force Organizational Excellence Award with silver and three bronze oak leaf clusters
Air Force Organizational Excellence Award (second ribbon to denote tenth award)
National Defense Service Medal with one bronze service star
Armed Forces Expeditionary Medal
Global War on Terrorism Expeditionary Medal
Global War on Terrorism Service Medal
Air Force Overseas Short Tour Service Ribbon
Air Force Overseas Long Tour Service Ribbon
Air Force Expeditionary Service Ribbon with gold frame
Air Force Expeditionary Service Ribbon
Air Force Longevity Service Award with silver and two bronze oak leaf clusters
Air Force Training Ribbon

Preceded by Thomas W. Travis	Surgeon General of the United States Air Force; 2015–2018	Succeeded by Dorothy A. Hogg
