= Thomas W. Travis =

Twenty-first Surgeon General of the United States Air Force

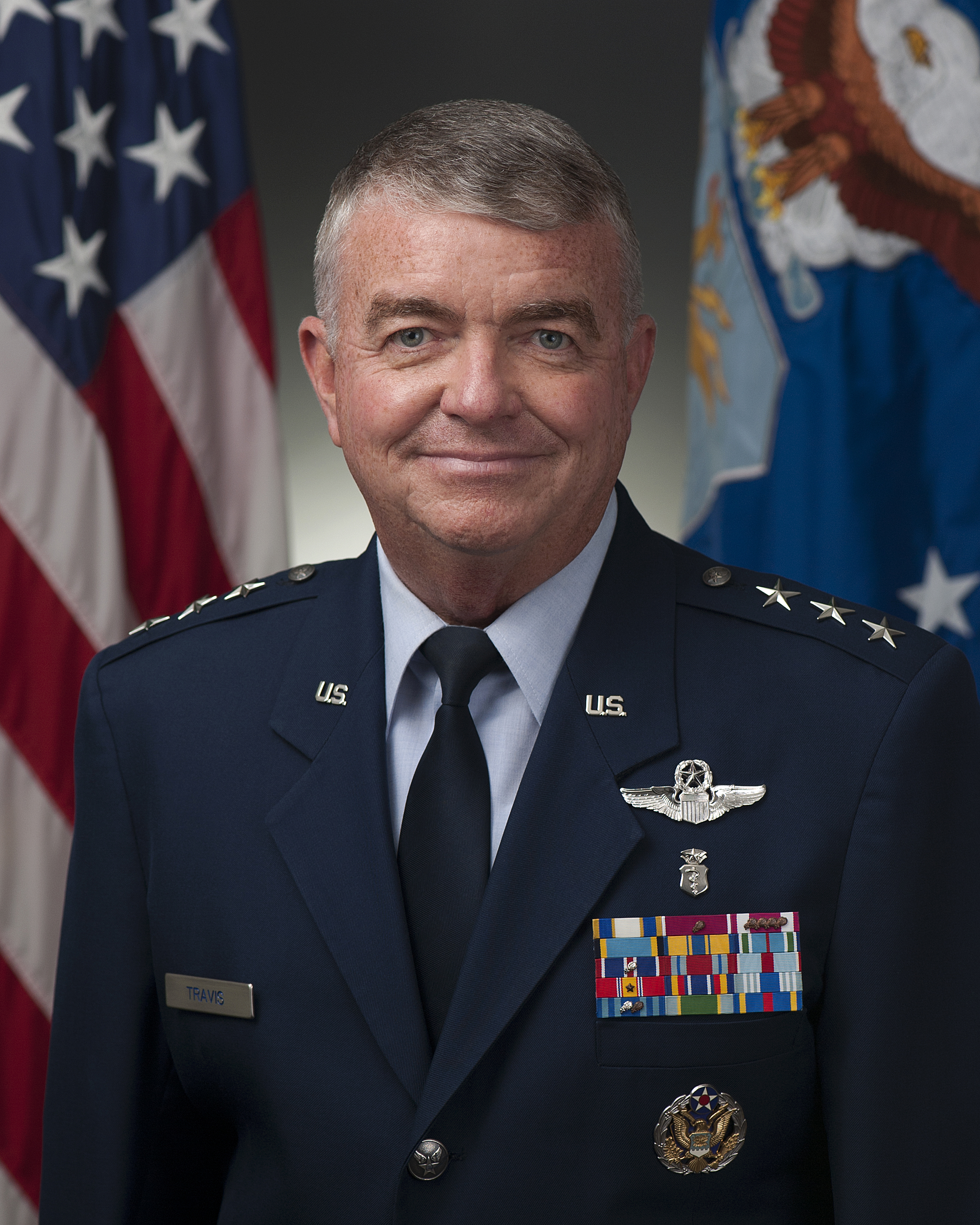
- Lieutenant General Thomas W. Travis in 2012
- Born: December 21, 1953 (age 72)
- Military career
- Allegiance: United States
- Branch: United States Air Force
- Service years: 1976–2015
- Rank: Lieutenant general
- Commands: Surgeon General of the United States Air Force; 59th Medical Wing; 89th Medical Group; 311th Human Systems Wing; United States Air Force School of Aerospace Medicine
- Awards: Air Force Distinguished Service Medal (2); Legion of Merit (2)
- Other work: Senior Vice President of the Uniformed Services University of the Health Sciences

Thomas W. Travis (born December 21, 1953) is a retired lieutenant general of the United States Air Force who served as the twenty-first Surgeon General of the United States Air Force. Holding dual ratings as a Command Pilot and Flight Surgeon, Travis achieved the highest rank of any pilot-physician in the history of the program. After completing at total of over 39 years of active service in the Air Force, Travis retired in August 2015 to become the Senior Vice President of the Uniformed Services University of the Health Sciences.

Military offices
Preceded by Charles B. Green	Surgeon General of the United States Air Force; 2012–2015	Succeeded by Mark A. Ediger
