= Malcolm Grow Medical Clinic =

Military hospital at Joint Base Andrews, MD, US

Coordinates: 38°48′24″N 76°53′48″W

Geography
- Location: Joint Base Andrews, Maryland, United States

History
- Opened: 1958

Links
- Lists: Hospitals in Maryland

Malcolm Grow Medical Clinics and Surgery Center is a United States Air Force medical treatment facility located on Joint Base Andrews Maryland and operated by the 11th Medical Group. The original facility designated U.S.A.F. Hospital Andrews opened in 1958 and was redesignated Malcolm Grow U.S.A.F. Medical Center in 1962. It is named after Major General (Dr.) Malcolm C. Grow, the first Surgeon General of the United States Air Force.
