= Dan C. Ogle =

Surgeon General of the United States Air Force (1901-1990)

Dan Clark Ogle
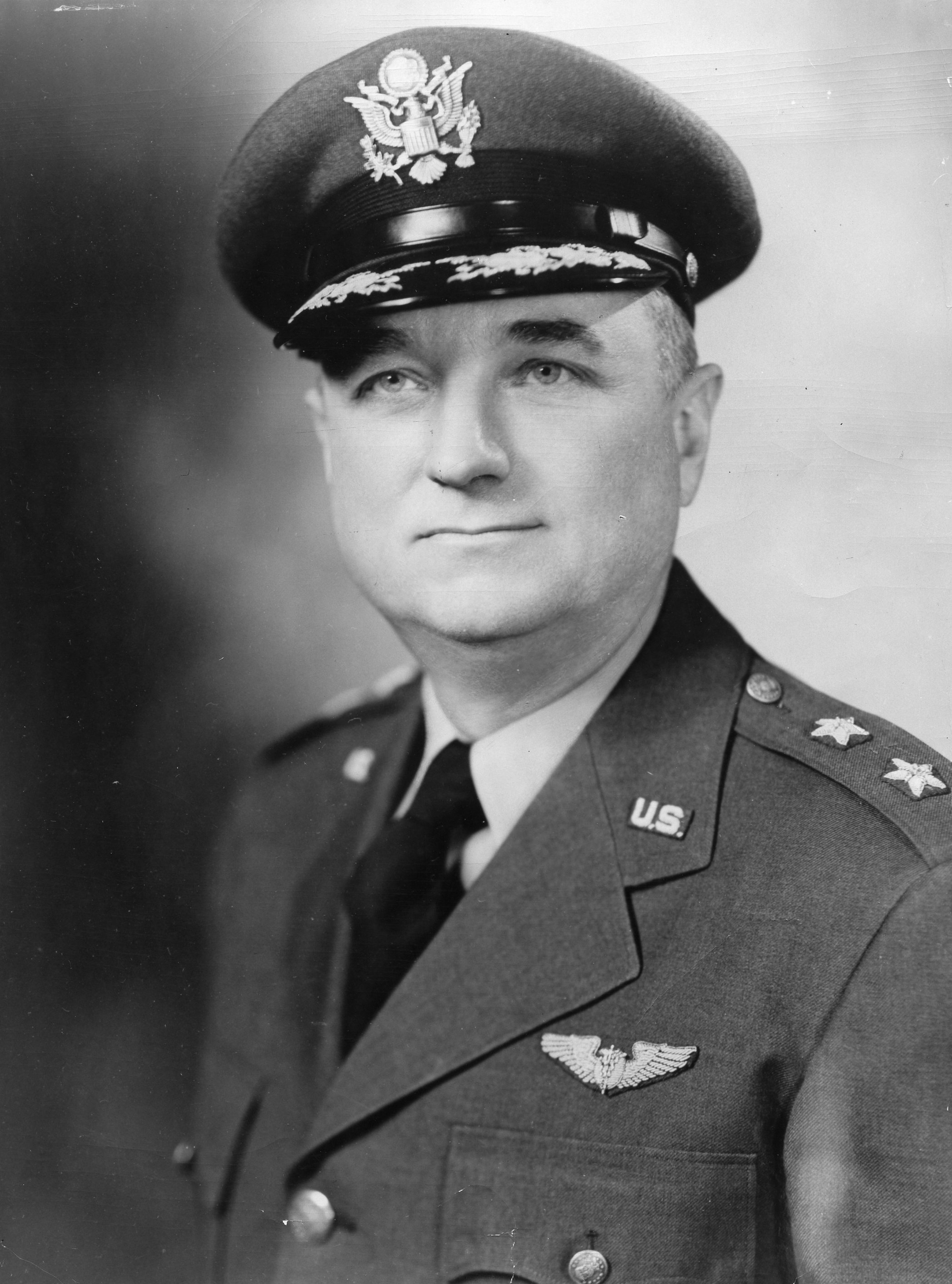
- Born: October 9, 1901; Keithsburg, Illinois
- Died: August 30, 1990 (aged 88)
- Education: Eureka College (BA); University of Illinois College of Medicine (MD)
- Military career
- Allegiance: United States of America
- Branch: United States Air Force
- Service years: 1929–1958
- Rank: Major General
- Commands: U.S. Air Force Surgeon General
- Awards: Bronze Star

Major General Dan Clark Ogle (October 9, 1901 – August 30, 1990) was the third Surgeon General of the United States Air Force.

== Biography ==
Ogle was born at Keithsburg, Illinois, in 1901. He graduated from Eureka College, Illinois, in 1924, where he was initiated a member of Tau Kappa Epsilon fraternity (Ronald Reagan was initiated at the same chapter five years later). He received his doctor of medicine degree from the University of Illinois College of Medicine in 1929.

Appointed a first lieutenant in the Medical Corps Reserve that June, General Ogle was assigned to medical duty at William Beaumont General Hospital at El Paso, Texas, and received his Regular commission as a first lieutenant in the Medical Corps July 1, 1930. Entering the School of Aviation Medicine at Brooks Field, Texas, in April 1931, he graduated that July; entered the Army Medical School at Washington, D.C., three months later and graduated in January 1932; and four months later graduated from the Medical Field Service School at Carlisle Barracks, Pennsylvania.

Assigned to Chanute Field, Illinois, as flight surgeon and war officer at the station hospital, he was named post surgeon in May 1936. The following November he went to Luke Field, Hawaii, where he served as post surgeon. In March 1939 he was appointed war officer at the Army and Navy General Hospital, Hot Springs, Arkansas, and in June 1941 resumed his position as post surgeon at Chanute.

Moving to Miami Beach, Florida, in April 1942, General Ogle was named post surgeon of the Technical Training Center, and the following March assumed command of the Army Air Force Regional Station Hospital at Coral Gables, Florida. Going overseas in December 1944, he was appointed staff surgeon of the 15th Air Force in Italy. Returning to the United States the following September, he was named chief of the Plans and Services Division in the Office of the Air Surgeon, Washington, D.C.

Transferred to Maxwell Field, Alabama, in November 1945, General Ogle was named post surgeon, and a month later was appointed command surgeon of the Air University there, in addition. In December 1946 he relinquished his duties as post surgeon, retaining his position as command surgeon. Entering the Air War College there in August 1948, he graduated in June 1949.

The following December General Ogle was named deputy surgeon general of the Air Force, and in July 1949 was transferred from the Army to the Air Force. Going to Wiesbaden, Germany, in March 1953, General Ogle was named surgeon for the U.S. Air Forces in Europe.

On July 15, 1954, General Ogle was designated surgeon general of the U.S. Air Force, with headquarters at Washington, D.C.

General Ogle can be seen at the beginning of the 1956 movie "On the Threshold of Space" introducing the aeromedical theme of the movie.

== Awards and decorations ==
He was awarded the Bronze Star and is rated a flight surgeon and aircraft observer (Medical). General Ogle was a member of the American Medical Association, Association of Military Surgeons, and the Aero-Medical Association. He died April 30, 1990.

Preceded by Harry G. Armstrong	Surgeon General of the United States Air Force; 1954–1958	Succeeded by Oliver K. Niess
