= Sean L. Murphy =

U.S. Air Force general

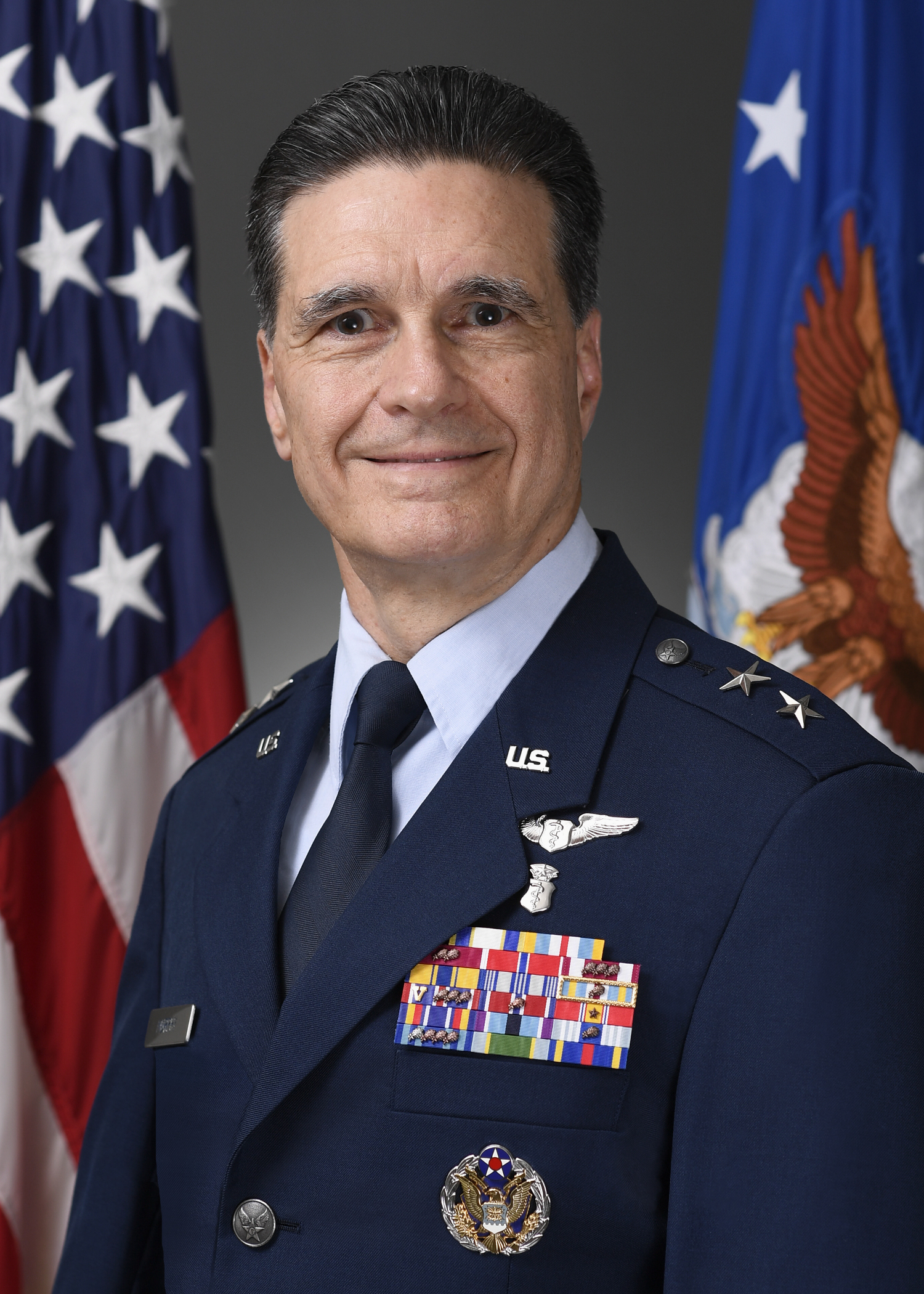
- Military career
- Allegiance: United States
- Branch: United States Air Force
- Service years: 1981–2021
- Rank: Major General
- Commands: Air Force Medical Operations Agency; 386th Expeditionary Medical Group; 325th Medical Group; 92nd Medical Operations Squadron
- Awards: Air Force Distinguished Service Medal; Defense Superior Service Medal; Legion of Merit (3)

Sean Lee Murphy is a retired United States Air Force major general who last served as the Deputy Surgeon General of the United States Air Force. Previously, he was the Command Surgeon of the Air Combat Command. Raised in Oxon Hill, Maryland, Murphy graduated from the United States Air Force Academy in 1981 with a B.S. degree in biology. He then went on to earn his M.D. degree from the Uniformed Services University of the Health Sciences in 1985 and to complete his residency in pediatrics at the Air Force Medical Center at Keesler Air Force Base in 1988.

Military offices
Preceded by Dorothy A. Hogg	Command Surgeon of the Air Combat Command; 2016–2018	Succeeded by Paul A. Friedrichs
Preceded by Dorothy A. Hogg	Deputy Surgeon General of the United States Air Force; 2018–2021	Succeeded by John DeGoes
