= George P. Taylor =

18th Surgeon General of the U.S. Air Force

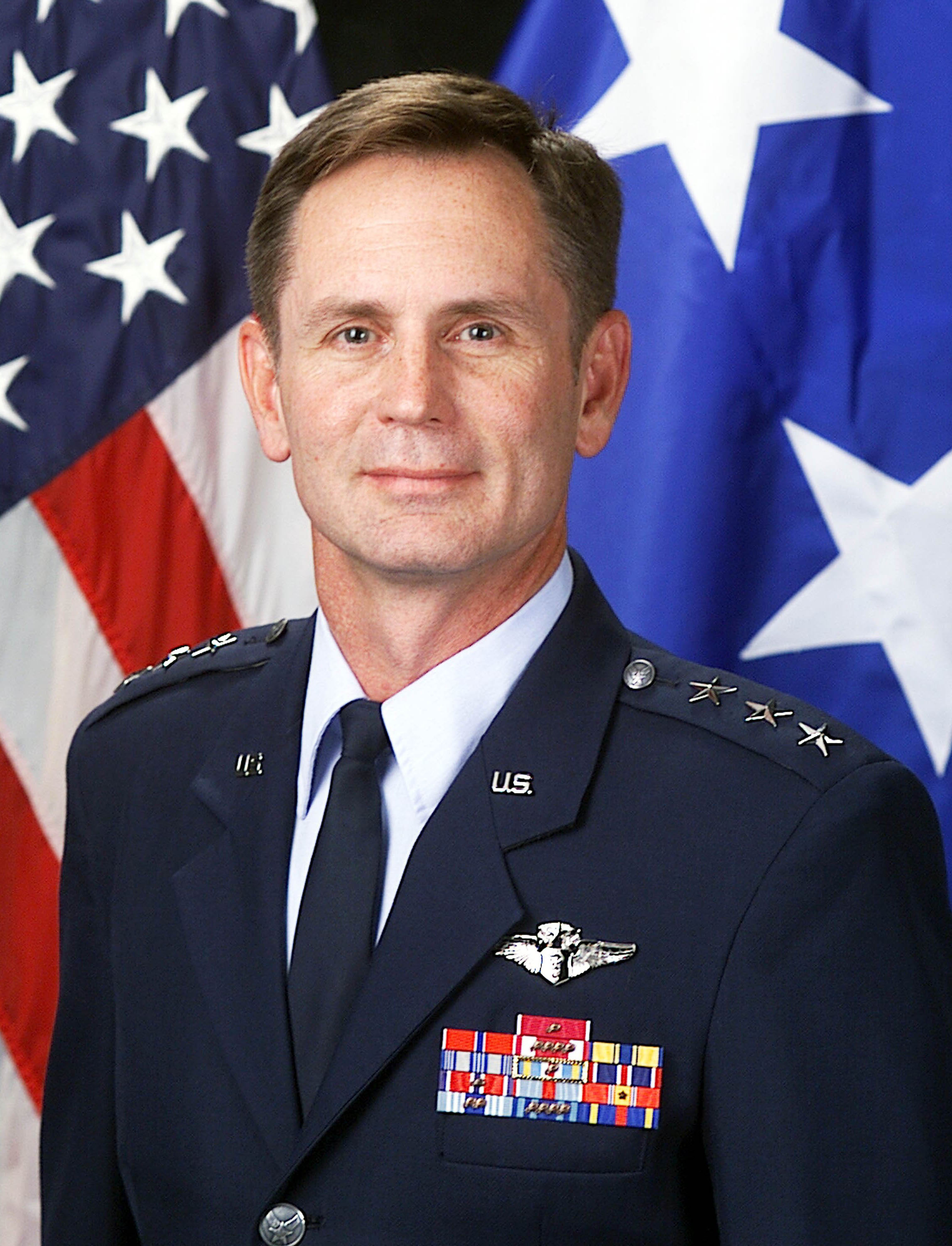
- Lieutenant General (Dr.) George Peach Taylor Jr.
- Born: 1953 (age 72–73); Birmingham, Alabama
- Military career
- Allegiance: United States of America
- Branch: United States Air Force
- Service years: 1979–2006
- Rank: Lieutenant General
- Commands: Surgeon General of the Air Force
- Awards: Air Force Distinguished Service Medal (2); Legion of Merit (2); Bronze Star

Lieutenant General George Peach Taylor Jr. USAF (Ret.) (born 1953) was the 18th Surgeon General of the United States Air Force, Headquarters U.S. Air Force, Washington, D.C.

== Life and career ==
General Taylor was born in Birmingham, Alabama and graduated from Rice University with degrees in physics and Russian language. He was commissioned a second lieutenant in the Air Force Reserve through the Health Professions Scholarship Program. Following his graduation from Baylor College of Medicine in Houston, Texas, and subsequent internship in Greenville, South Carolina, General Taylor entered active duty in 1979.

General Taylor was a chief flight surgeon and board certified in aerospace medicine by the American Board of Preventive Medicine. He served as a flight surgeon in a series of flight test and fighter assignments and was the commander of the Air Force hospital at Hill Air Force Base, Utah. General Taylor was the Command Surgeon with U.S. Air Forces in Europe at Ramstein Air Base, Germany, where he served as the TRICARE Regional Director for Europe for one year. In addition, he was the Air Force Surgeon during operations Allied Force and Shining Hope in the Balkans. He served as the Command Surgeon for Air Combat Command where he molded the Air Force medical support for the response to the attacks of September 11, 2001, and for Operation Noble Eagle and Operation Enduring Freedom. General Taylor chaired the medical portion of the 2005 Base Realignment and Closure process, which resulted in the creation of a new Walter Reed National Military Medical Center, a new San Antonio military medical system, a joint medical education and training complex, and joint biomedical research centers.

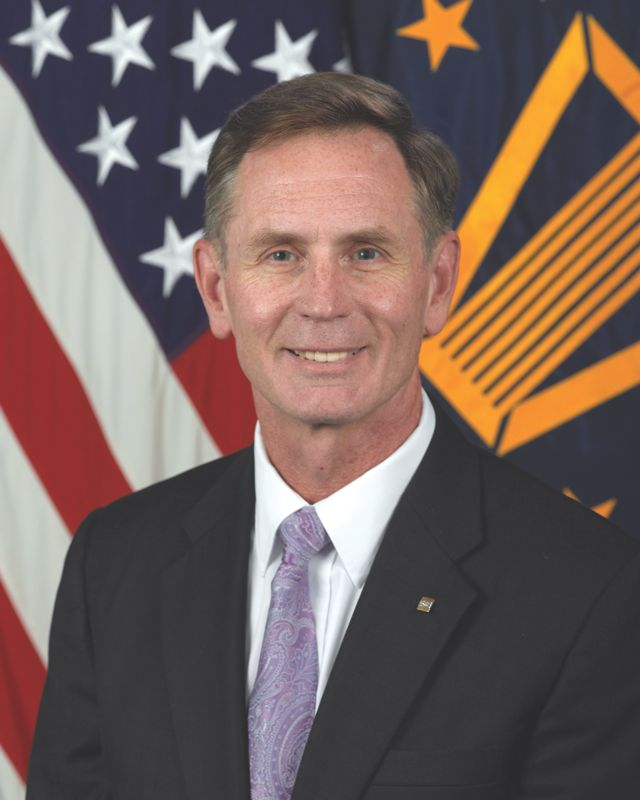
Taylor in 2010

From September 7, 2010 – December 22, 2010 he served as the acting Assistant Secretary of Defense for Health Affairs under Obama.

== Education ==
- 1975 Bachelor of Arts degree in physics and Russian language, Rice University, Houston, Texas
- 1978 Doctor of medicine, Baylor College of Medicine, Houston, Texas
- 1984 Master's degree in public health, Harvard School of Public Health, Boston, Massachusetts
- 1985 Residency in aerospace medicine, U.S. Air Force School of Aerospace Medicine, Brooks AFB, Texas
- 1993 National War College, Fort Lesley J. McNair, Washington, D.C.

== Assignments ==
- October 1979 – March 1981, Chief of Flight Medicine, U.S. Air Force Clinic, and Squadron Flight Surgeon, 67th Tactical Fighter Squadron, Kadena AB, Japan
- April 1981 – August 1983, Chief of Aerospace Medicine, Detachment 3, Air Force Flight Test Center, Henderson, Nevada
- September 1983 – June 1984, student, Harvard School of Public Health, Boston, Massachusetts
- July 1984 – June 1985, resident, U.S. Air Force School of Aerospace Medicine, Brooks AFB, Texas
- July 1985 – June 1988, Chief of Aerospace Medicine and Commander of the Air Transportable Hospital, U.S. Air Force Hospital, Torrejon AB, Spain
- July 1988 – June 1990, medical inspector of active-duty forces, Air Force Inspection and Safety Center, Norton AFB, California
- June 1990 – July 1992, Chief of Aerospace Medicine, U.S. Air Force Hospital, Air Force Flight Test Center, Edwards Air Force Base, California
- August 1992 – June 1993, student, National War College, Fort Lesley J. McNair, Washington, D.C.
- July 1993 – April 1995, Commander and Director of Base Medical Services, 75th Medical Group, Ogden Air Logistics Center, Hill AFB, Utah
- May 1995 – June 1996, Chief, Aerospace Medicine Division, later, Deputy Director, Air Force Medical Operations Agency, Bolling AFB, Washington, D.C.
- June 1996 – June 1997, Associate Director, later, Director of Medical Programs and Resources, Office of the Surgeon General, Bolling AFB, Washington, D.C.
- June 1997 – July 2000, Command Surgeon, U.S. Air Forces in Europe, Ramstein AB, Germany
- July 2000 – January 2002, Command Surgeon, Headquarters Air Combat Command, Langley AFB, Va.
- January 2002 – June 2002, Assistant Surgeon General for Expeditionary Operations, Science and Technology, Office of the Surgeon General, Bolling AFB, Washington, D.C.
- July 2002 – September 2002, Special Assistant to the Surgeon General of the Air Force, Office of the Surgeon General, Bolling AFB, Washington, D.C.
- October 2002 – October 2006, Surgeon General of the Air Force, Headquarters U.S. Air Force, Washington, D.C.

== Flight information ==
- Rating: Chief flight surgeon
- Flight hours: More than 1,600
- Aircraft: F-15D, F-16B/D, C-5, C-12, C-21, C-130, C-141, KC-135, T-37, T-38 and T-39

== Major awards and decorations ==
- Air Force Distinguished Service Medal with oak leaf cluster
- Defense Superior Service Medal
- Legion of Merit with oak leaf cluster
- Meritorious Service Medal with four oak leaf clusters
- Air Force Commendation Medal
- Air Force Achievement Medal
- Air Force Recognition Ribbon
- Gold Cross of Honor of the Bundeswehr (Germany)

== Other achievements ==
- Malcolm C. Grow Award for Air Force's Flight Surgeon of the Year
- Fellow, American College of Preventive Medicine
- Medical license: Texas
- Fellow and former council member, Aerospace Medical Association
- Former President, American Society of Aerospace Medicine Specialists
- Former President, Society of U.S. Air Force Flight Surgeons
- Air Force delegate, American Medical Association
- Lifetime member and Founders Medal Recipient, Association of Military Surgeons of the United States
- Chairman, Joint Medical Cross Service Group – Base Realignment and Closure (2002–2005)
- Distinguished Professor of Military/Emergency Medicine, Uniformed Services University of the Health Sciences
- Distinguished Alumni Award, Rice University, 2007

== Effective dates of promotion ==
- Second Lieutenant 1975
- First Lieutenant 1977
- Captain July 2, 1979
- Major June 5, 1984
- Lieutenant Colonel September 30, 1989
- Colonel May 31, 1994
- Brigadier General April 1, 2000
- Major General July 1, 2002
- Lieutenant General December 1, 2002

Preceded by Paul K. Carlton, Jr.	Surgeon General of the United States Air Force; 2002–2006	Succeeded by James G. Roudebush
