= 89th Medical Group =

US Air Force medical group

- Active: 1958 - 2007
- Country: United States
- Branch: United States Air Force
- Type: Medical care
- Garrison/HQ: Malcom Grow Medical Center at Andrews Air Force Base
- Motto: To conserve fighting strength

The 89th Medical Group was a United States Air Force medical group. It was based in Andrews Air Force Base before it inactivated. It was commanded by Brigadier General Thomas W. Travis. It was based at a 70-bed tertiary care center located in the Andrews Air Force Base. It included physiological training including altitude chamber training.
