= Charles B. Green =

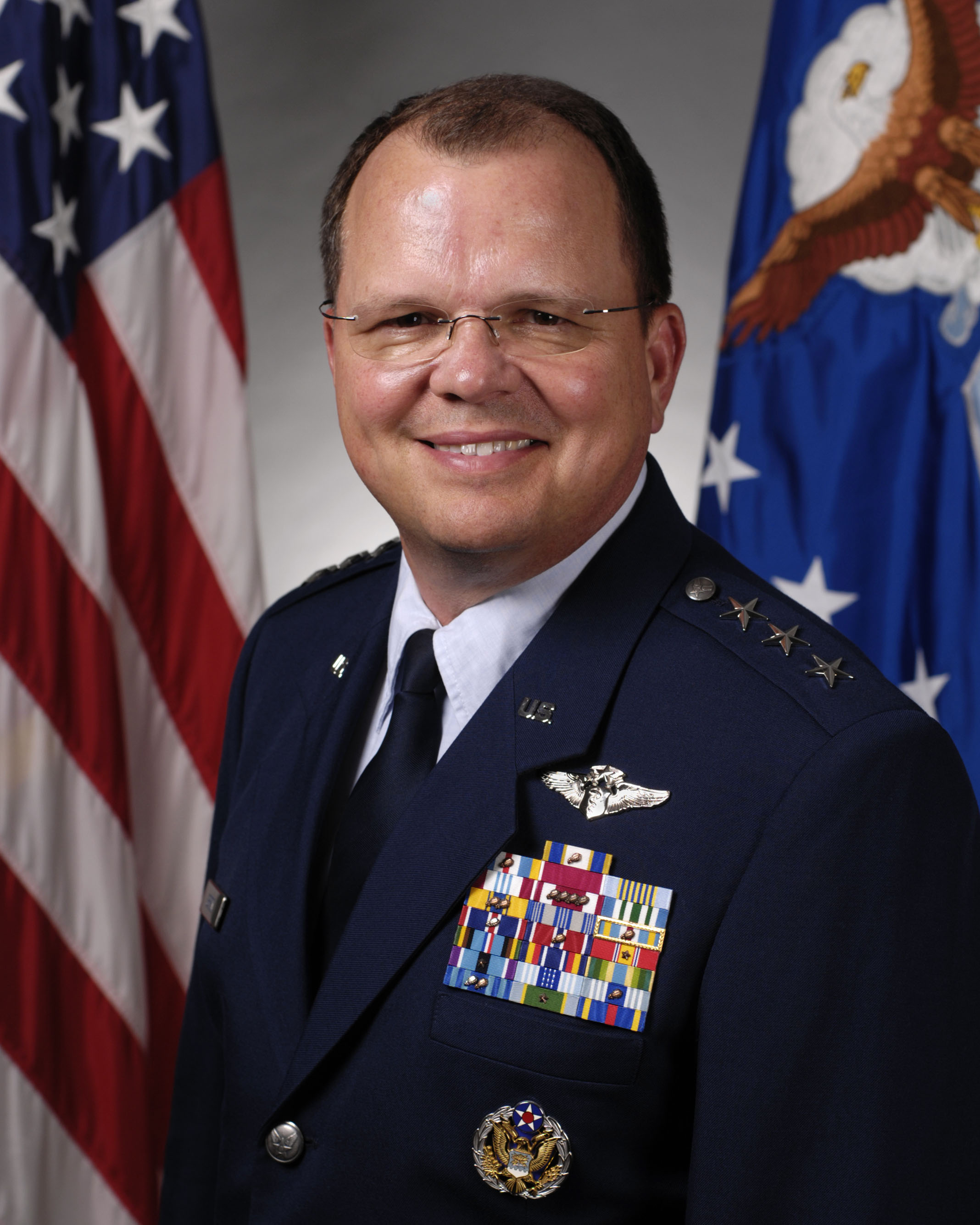
- Lieutenant General Charles B. Green; 20th USAF Surgeon General (2009–2012)
- Born: June 1, 1955 (age 71); Topeka, Kansas, U.S.
- Military career
- Allegiance: United States of America
- Branch: United States Air Force
- Rank: Lieutenant General
- Commands: U.S. Air Force Surgeon General

Charles Bruce Green (born June 1, 1955) is a retired lieutenant general in the United States Air Force and was the twentieth Surgeon General of the United States Air Force.

== Career ==
Green joined the Air Force in 1978. He was first assigned to Eglin Air Force Base. Later, he was assigned to Mather Air Force Base, Wheeler Air Force Base, Hickam Air Force Base, Brooks City-Base, and Clark Air Base. In 1990, Green assisted in humanitarian efforts in the Philippines after a major earthquake struck Baguio and also during Operation Fiery Vigil. He was named Command Surgeon of the United States Central Command in 1997, North American Aerospace Defense Command in 1999, and the United States Transportation Command and Air Mobility Command in 2001. Later, he was given command of the 59th Medical Wing. He was named Assistant Surgeon General for Health Care Operations in 2005 before becoming Deputy Surgeon General in 2006. Green was named Surgeon General in 2009.

Awards he has received include the Air Force Distinguished Service Medal with oak leaf cluster, the Defense Superior Service Medal with oak leaf cluster, the Legion of Merit, the Defense Meritorious Service Medal, the Airman's Medal, the Meritorious Service Medal with four oak leaf clusters, the Joint Service Commendation Medal, the Air Force Commendation Medal with two oak leaf clusters, the Air Force Achievement Medal, the National Defense Service Medal with service star, the Armed Forces Expeditionary Medal, and the Humanitarian Service Medal with service star.

== Education ==
- B.S., Chemistry – University of Wisconsin-Parkside
- M.D. – Medical College of Wisconsin
- Graduate – Air Command and Staff College
- M.P.H. – Harvard University
- Graduate – Air War College

Preceded by James G. Roudebush	Surgeon General of the United States Air Force; 2009–2012	Succeeded by Thomas W. Travis
