= Harry George Armstrong =

US Air Force surgeon general

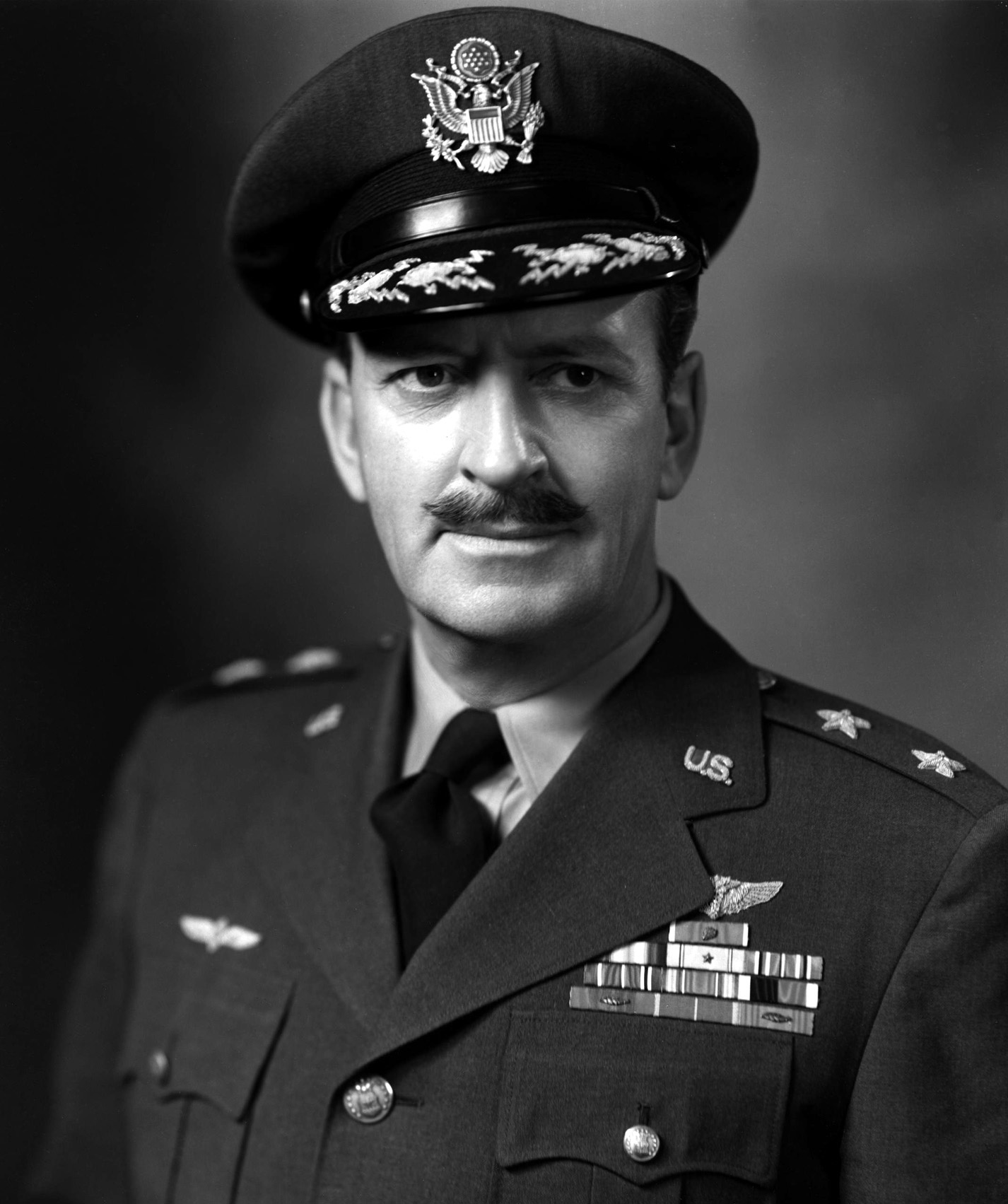
- Major General Harry George Armstrong
- Born: February 17, 1899; De Smet, South Dakota
- Died: February 5, 1983 (aged 83)
- Military career
- Allegiance: United States of America
- Branch: United States Air Force
- Service years: 1918–1919 (Marine Corps); 1925–1957 (Army/Air Force)
- Rank: Major general
- Commands: Surgeon General of the Air Force
- Awards: Distinguished Service Medal; Legion of Merit (2); Order of the British Empire; Croix de Guerre; Collier Award

Harry George Armstrong (February 17, 1899 – February 5, 1983) was a major general in the United States Air Force, a physician, and an airman. He is widely recognized as a pioneer in the field of aviation medicine. The Armstrong limit, the altitude above which water boils at the temperature of the human body, is named after him.

Armstrong served in the Marines during World War I and the Army and Air Force from 1930 to 1957. As director of the United States Aeromedical Research Laboratory, he applied his medical and aviation knowledge to the improvement of aircrew protection from temperature extremes and the lack of oxygen at high altitude.

== Early life, education, and military career ==
Armstrong was born in De Smet, South Dakota, in 1899. He attended the University of Minnesota, but left after one year to enlist in the US Marine Corps, serving with them as a private from October 1918 to March 1919. He then entered the University of South Dakota, graduating in 1921. In 1925 he received his Doctor of Medicine Degree from the University of Louisville. He entered the Medical Corps Reserve in April 1925. Armstrong entered the School of Aviation Medicine at Brooks Field, Texas, that September. Upon graduation in 1930, he was commissioned a first lieutenant in the Regular Army Medical Corps.

== Military career ==
In 1931, he was attached to the Air Corps and assigned as assistant surgeon. He was promoted to captain in 1932, to major in 1938, lieutenant colonel (temporary) in February 1942, and to colonel (temporary) in August 1942. Serving alternately in England and the United States, in 1945 he became surgeon for the Air Division in the office of Military Government for Germany (U.S.), with headquarters in Berlin. In 1946, he was promoted to lieutenant colonel (permanent), returned to the School of Aviation Medicine at Randolph Field upon appointment as assistant commandant, and that July was named commandant. In 1948, he was promoted brigadier general (temporary), then to major general (temporary).

== Surgeon General of the Air Force ==
In June 1949, he was assigned to air force headquarters at Washington, D.C., as Deputy Surgeon General of the U.S. Air Force, promoted to colonel (permanent) in October, and the following December was designated surgeon general. Armstrong was promoted to brigadier general (permanent) October 9, 1951. In 1954, General Armstrong went to Wiesbaden, Germany, as Surgeon of the United States Air Forces in Europe.

== Later life ==
Armstrong retired from the air force in 1957. He died in 1983 from heart disease.

In 1977, the Air Force Aerospace Medical Research Laboratory created the Harry G. Armstrong Award for Scientific Excellence.

== Awards and decorations ==
=== Ribbon bar ===
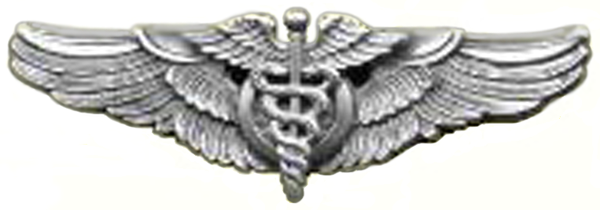

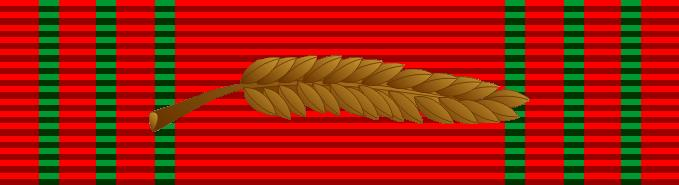

USAAF Flight Surgeon wings
| 1st row | Air Force Distinguished Service Medal | Legion of Merit with Oak Leaf Cluster | World War I Victory Medal | American Defense Service Medal with Foreign Service Clasp |
| 2nd row | American Campaign Medal | European-African-Middle Eastern Campaign Medal | World War II Victory Medal | Army of Occupation Medal |
| 3rd row | National Defense Service Medal | French Croix de Guerre 1939–1945 with Palm | Order of the British Empire | Belgian Croix de Guerre 1940–1945 with Palm |

=== Other awards ===
- Wellcome Award (1937)
- Collier Award (1939)
- John Jeffries Award (1941)
- Honorary Fellow of American College of Healthcare Executives (HFACHE) (1953)
- Edward Warner Award (1981)
- National Aviation Hall of Fame (1998)

== Effective dates of promotion ==
| Insignia | Rank | Date |
|---|---|---|
| | Major general | July 29, 1949 |
| | Brigadier general | April 27, 1948 |
| | Colonel | August 28, 1942 |
| | Lieutenant colonel | February 1, 1942 |
| | Major | July 15, 1938 |
| | Captain | December 15, 1932 |
| | First lieutenant | April 26, 1929 |
| | Second lieutenant | Skipped this grade |

== Published works ==
Armstrong published 105 scientific papers in the field of aviation medicine and aerospace medicine.

- Principles and Practice of Aviation Medicine, Williams & Wilkins (1939)
- Aerospace medicine, Williams & Wilkins Co (1961) ISBN 0-683-07109-2

== Notes ==
| Preceded by Malcolm C. Grow | Surgeon General of the United States Air Force; 1949–1954 | Succeeded by Dan C. Ogle |
