= Malcolm C. Grow =

United States Air Force general

Malcolm Cummings Grow
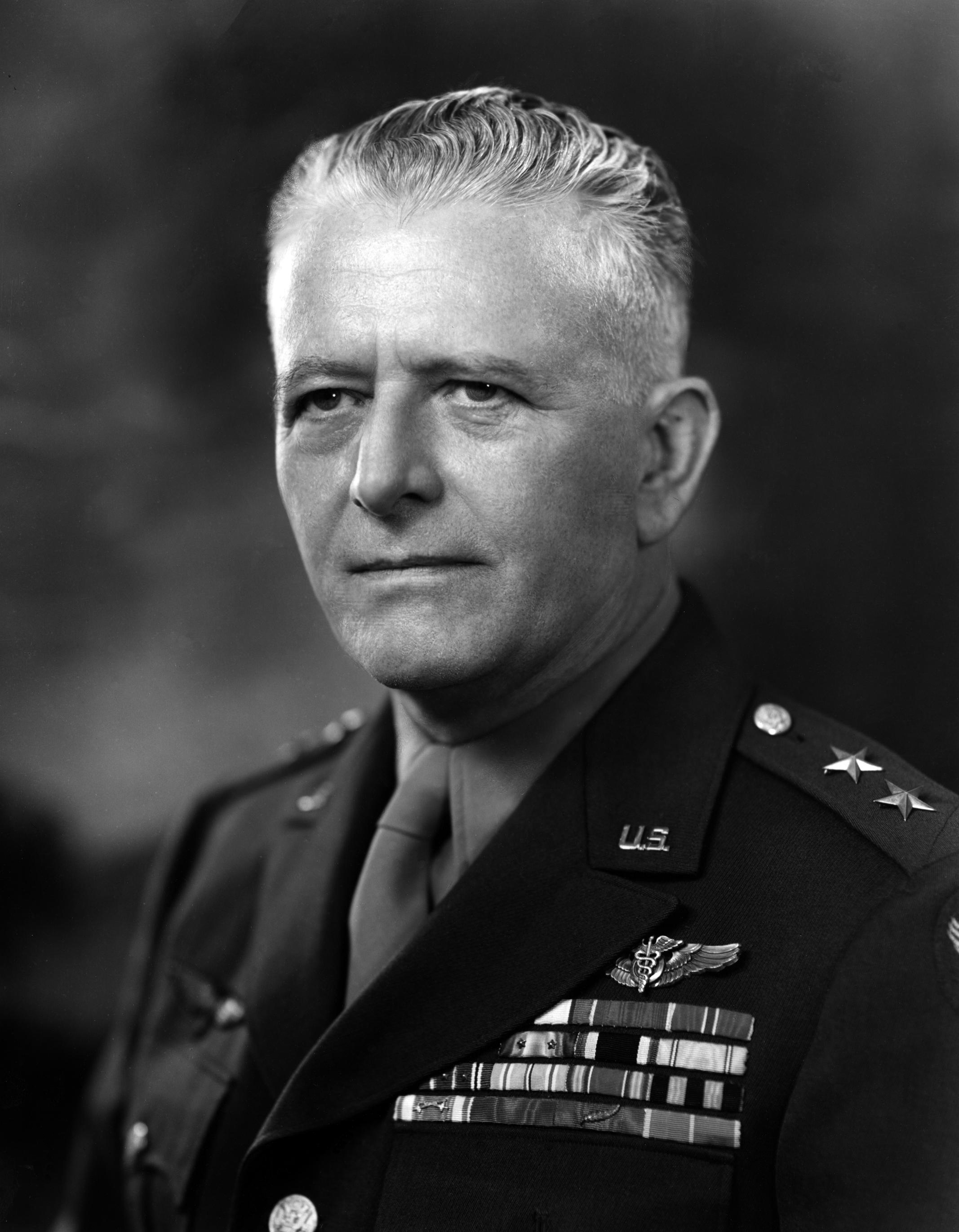
- Born: November 19, 1887
- Died: October 20, 1960 (aged 72)
- Burial place: Arlington National Cemetery
- Military career
- Allegiance: United States
- Branch: United States Air Force
- Service years: 1917–1949
- Rank: Major General
- Commands: U.S. Air Force Medical Service
- Conflicts: World War I World War II
- Awards: Distinguished Service Medal; Legion of Merit; Bronze Star Medal; Order of Saint Stanislaus, 3rd class (Russia); Order of St. George, 4th class (Russia); Gorgas Medal

Major General Malcolm Cummings Grow (November 19, 1887 – October 20, 1960) was the first Surgeon General of the United States Air Force from July 1, 1949 to November 30, 1949.

== Biography ==
Grow received his medical degree from Jefferson Medical College in 1909. In August, 1915 Dr. Grow met Dr. Edward Egbert, Chief Surgeon of the American Red Cross Hospital in Kiev, in Washington, D.C. Dr. Egbert convinced Grow to travel with him to Saint Petersburg, Russia, to assist in the Russian war effort. Dr. Grow was commissioned Lt.Colonel in the Imperial Russian Medical Corps and served as regimental surgeon in the First Division of the First Siberian Army Corps in Galicia. Surgeon Grow twice distinguished himself and received the Order of Saint Stanislaus, 3rd class with swords, and was awarded the Order of St. George, 4th class for gallantry in action. Dr. Grow left Russia after the February Revolution of 1917, and entered the U.S. Army Medical Service later the same year.

While chief flight surgeon of the Army Air Corps from 1934 to 1939 he (in conjunction with Major General Harry G. Armstrong) founded the Aero Medical Laboratory at Wright-Patterson Air Force Base, Ohio.

In July 1943, General Grow received the Legion of Merit for developing body armor to protect combat crews. A study of wounds incurred by members of combat crews showed that nearly 70 percent were caused by missiles of relatively low velocity. He led the way in developing a light body armor and steel helmet that saved many lives and materially improved combat crew morale.

In May 1944, General Grow was awarded the Distinguished Service Medal for developing a device to protect gunners from windblast; electrically heated clothing, gloves, boots, handwarmers and casualty bags for wounded; wind and fire resistant face and neck protectors; and a special combat ration for use on long bombing missions. Frostbite cases decreased and flight efficiency increased. After a study of psychiatric failures in combat, he helped institute rest homes, a new special pass system, and special training for medical officers in tactical units. As a result, every casualty of this type was returned to duty.

Such efforts, especially in research, won for him the John Jeffries Award in 1947, the Gorgas Medal in 1950 and many others, including many from other nations. Just prior to his retirement, he received an oak leaf cluster to his Distinguished Service Medal for his efforts in promoting the study of aeromedicine, airborne medical equipment, and organizational planning.

Grow was appointed acting air surgeon for the Army Air Forces in 1945 and Air Surgeon in 1946. He served as the first Surgeon General of the United States Air Force from July 1, 1949 to November 30, 1949.

=== Retirement and death ===
He retired from the Air Force on December 1, 1949, and died October 20, 1960.

== Legacy ==
- The Malcolm Grow Medical Center at Andrews Air Force Base is named in his honor.

== Books ==
Grow, Malcolm C. Surgeon Grow. An American in the Russian Fighting. New York, NY: Frederick A. Stokes Company. 1918

Grow, Malcolm C. and Harry G. Armstrong. Fit to Fly; a medical handbook for fliers. New York: D. Appleton-Century company, 1941

Preceded by none	Surgeon General of the United States Air Force; 1949	Succeeded by Harry G. Armstrong
