= Dorothy Hogg (jeweller) =

Dorothy Hogg MBE
- Born: 1945; Troon, Scotland
- Died: 2022 (aged 76–77); Edinburgh
- Education: Glasgow School of Art, Royal College of Art
- Occupations: jeweller, craftsperson, teacher
- Employer: University of Edinburgh
- Known for: Jewellery design

Dorothy Hogg MBE (1945-2022) was an artist, craftswoman, and teacher who served as the Head of Silversmithing and Jewellery at Edinburgh College of Art (ECA), University of Edinburgh.

== Life ==
Hogg was born in Troon. She attended Glasgow School of Art and the Royal College of Art, London.

== Career ==
Hogg was Head of the Department of Jewellery and Silversmithing at ECA from 1985 to 2007.

She was a trustee of the Crafts Council and influenced a great many jewellers during her career.

In 2008, Hogg was the first craft resident in the new Sackler Centre at the Victoria & Albert Museum, London.

In 2021, The Goldsmiths’ Company announced the acquisition of works by Hogg and their archives hold a number of her designs and drawings.

Her work is held in the collections of the V&A, National Museums of Scotland, the Museum of Art and Design, New York; V&A, London; The Alice and Louis Koch Collection, Swiss National Museum, Zurich; and the Montreal Museum of Fine Arts, Canada.

== Awards and honours ==
In 2001, Hogg received an MBE in recognition of her services to silversmithing and jewellery.

In 2019, was awarded a Lifetime Achievement Medal at the Goldsmiths’ Craft and Design Awards.
