= Dorothy A. Hogg =

Twenty-third Surgeon General of the United States Air Force

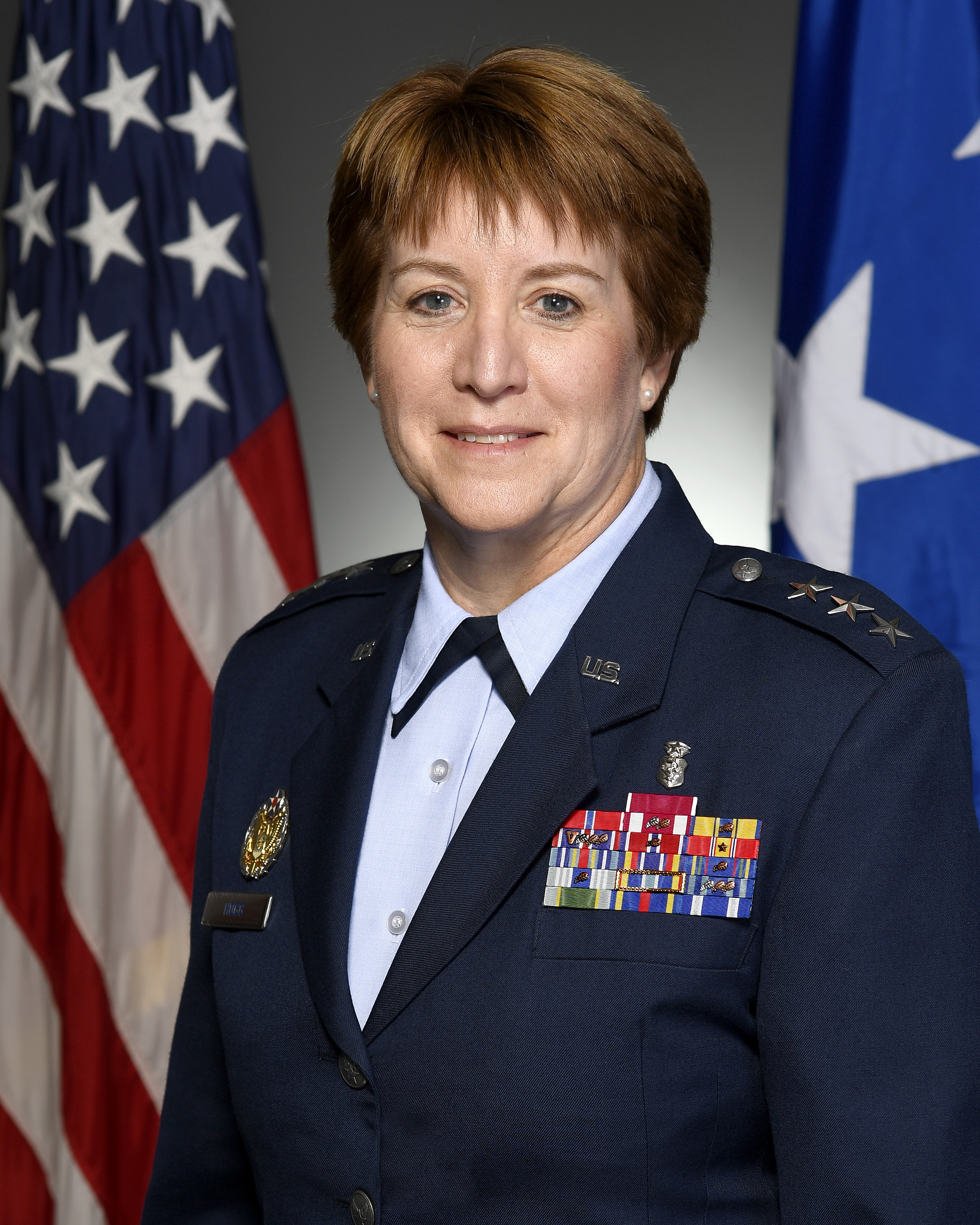
- Lieutenant General Dorothy A. Hogg; 23rd USAF Surgeon General (2018–2021)
- Military career
- Allegiance: United States
- Branch: United States Air Force
- Service years: 1983–2021
- Rank: Lieutenant general
- Commands: U.S. Air Force Surgeon General

Dorothy A. Hogg is a nurse and a actively lieutenant general of the United States Air Force who is currently serving as the 23rd Surgeon General of the United States Air Force and United States Space Force. Hogg serves as functional manager of the U.S. Air Force Medical Service. In this capacity, she advises the Secretary of the Air Force and Air Force Chief of Staff, as well as the Assistant Secretary of Defense for Health Affairs on matters pertaining to the medical aspects of the air expeditionary force and the health of Airmen.

Hogg entered the Air Force in 1983 and has commanded at the squadron and group level, and served as the deputy command surgeon for two major commands. She has deployed in support of operations Enduring Freedom and Iraqi Freedom.

== Education ==
- 1981 Bachelor of Science degree in Nursing, University of Southern Maine, Portland, Maine
- 1987 Women's Health Nurse Practitioner, School of Healthcare Sciences, Sheppard Air Force Base, Texas
- 1992 Master of Public Administration, Troy State University, Troy, Alabama
- 1997 Master of Science in Nursing, Medical University of South Carolina

== Awards and decorations ==
Chief Air Force Nurse Corps Badge
Headquarters Air Force Badge

Legion of Merit
Bronze Star Medal
Meritorious Service Medal with one silver and one bronze oak leaf clusters
Air Force Commendation Medal with oak leaf cluster
Air Force Outstanding Unit Award with Valor device, one silver and two bronze oak leaf clusters
Organizational Excellence Award with oak leaf cluster
National Defense Service Medal with one bronze service star
Global War on Terrorism Expeditionary Medal
Global War on Terrorism Service Medal
Nuclear Deterrence Operations Service Medal with oak leaf cluster
Air Force Overseas Long Tour Service Ribbon with oak leaf cluster
Air Force Expeditionary Service Ribbon with gold frame
Air Force Longevity Service Award with silver and three bronze oak leaf clusters
Small Arms Expert Marksmanship Ribbon
Air Force Training Ribbon
NATO Medal for service with ISAF

Military offices
Preceded by Mark A. Ediger	Deputy Surgeon General of the United States Air Force; 2015–2018	Succeeded by Sean L. Murphy
Preceded by Mark A. Ediger	Surgeon General of the United States Air Force; 2018–2021	Succeeded by Robert I. Miller
New office	Surgeon General of the United States Space Force; 2019–2021	Succeeded by Robert I. Miller
