= John DeGoes =

U.S. Air Force general

John J. DeGoes
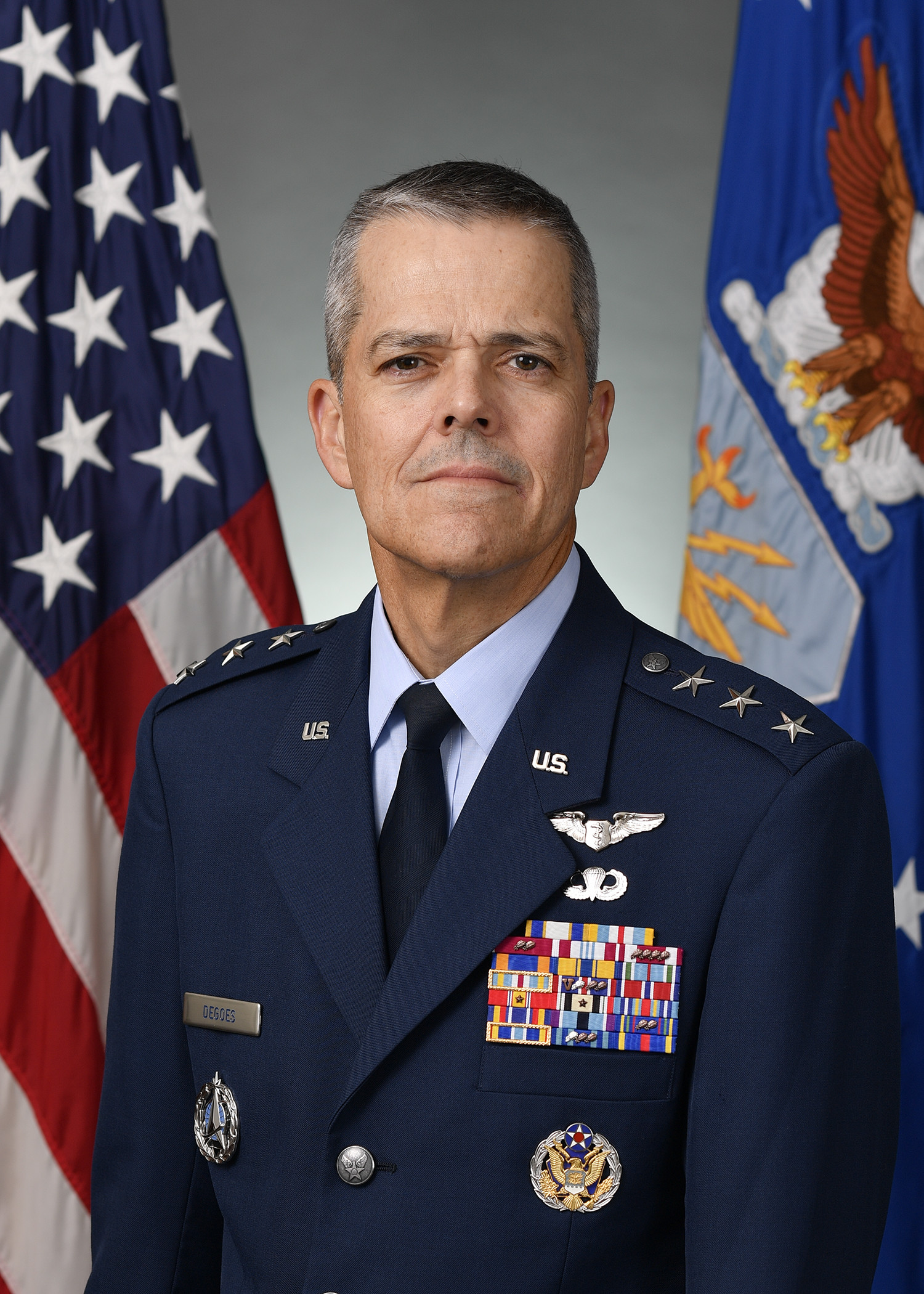
- Military career
- Allegiance: United States
- Branch: United States Air Force
- Service years: 1989–present
- Rank: Lieutenant General
- Commands: Surgeon General of the United States Air Force; Air Force Medical Command; 59th Medical Wing; 99th Medical Group; 1st Medical Group; 31st Medical Operations Squadron
- Conflicts: Iraq War
- Awards: Air Force Distinguished Service Medal; Defense Superior Service Medal; Legion of Merit (3)

John J. DeGoes is a United States Air Force lieutenant general has served as the twenty-fifth surgeon general of the United States Air Force and Space Force since 31 July 2024, and as the commander of Air Force Medical Command since 1 July 2025. He most recently served as the deputy surgeon general of the United States Air Force. Prior to that, DeGoes served as the commander of the 59th Medical Wing.

In May 2024, DeGoes was nominated for promotion to lieutenant general and assignment as surgeon general of the United States Air Force. In June 2025, he was nominated for additional assignment as the commander of Air Force Medical Command.

Military offices
Preceded by ???	Vice Commander of the 59th Medical Wing; 2016–2018	Succeeded by Stephen K. Donaldson
Preceded by Bart Iddins	Commander of the 59th Medical Wing; 2018–2021	Succeeded by Jeannine M. Ryder
Preceded by Sean L. Murphy	Deputy Surgeon General of the United States Air Force; 2021–2024	Succeeded by Stephen M. Mounts
Preceded by Robert I. Miller	Surgeon General of the United States Air Force and United States Space Force; 2024–present	Incumbent
Preceded by Sean T. Collins	Commander of the Air Force Medical Command; 2025–present	Incumbent
