= Surgeon General of the United States Air Force and United States Space Force =

Senior-most Medical Service officer in the United States Department of the Air Force

Surgeon General of the Air Force and Space Force
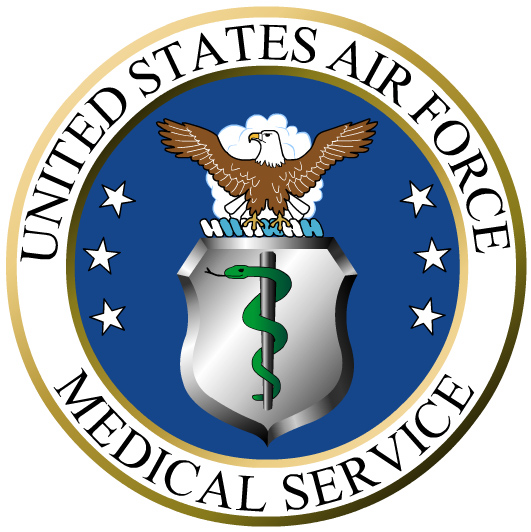
- Seal of the US Air Force Medical Service

- Flag of an Air Force lieutenant general

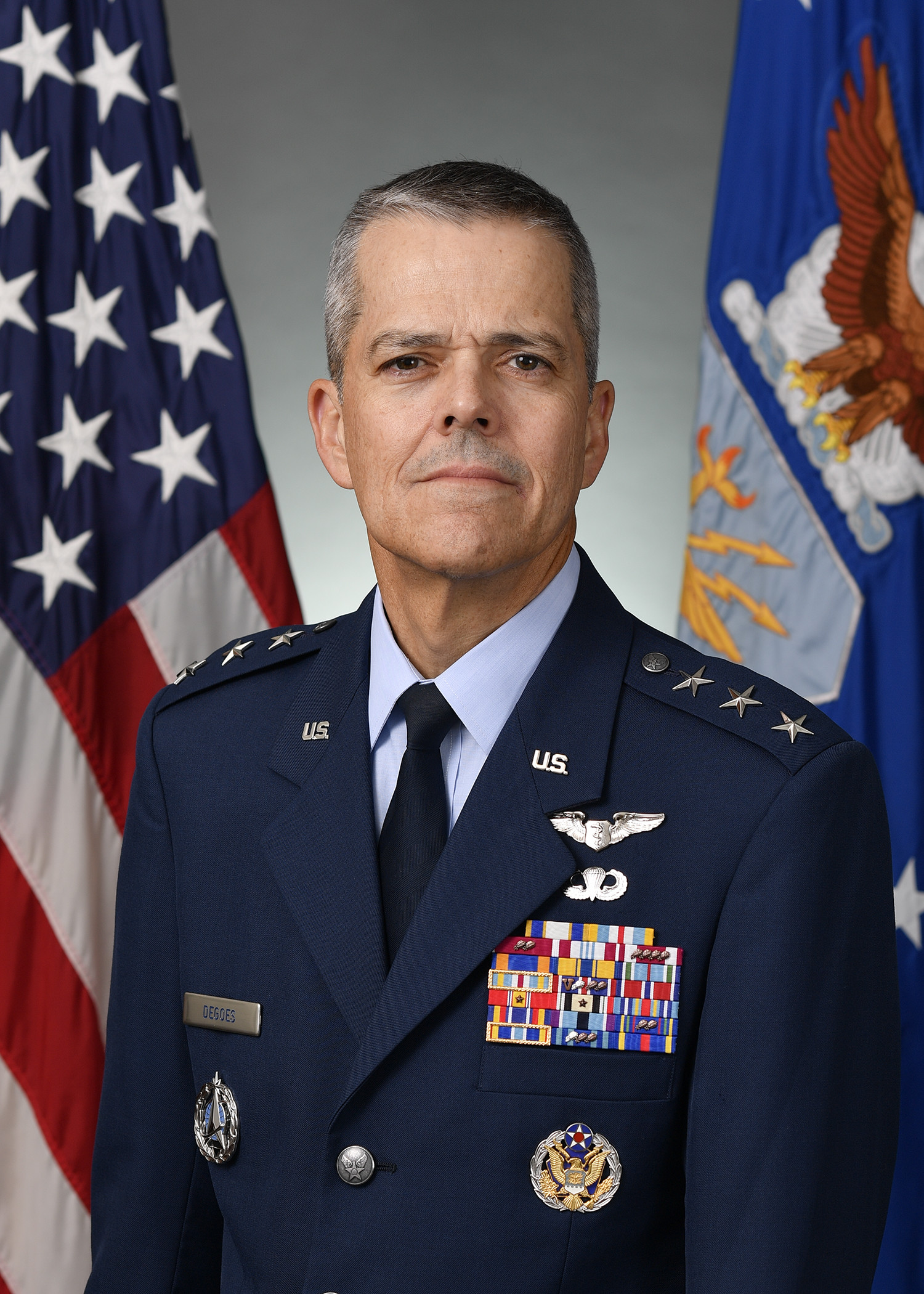
- Incumbent; Lieutenant General John DeGoes since July 31, 2024
- Air Staff; Air Force Medical Service
- Reports to: Chief of Staff of the Air Force
- Appointer: The president; with Senate advice and consent
- Constituting instrument: 10 U.S.C. § 8036
- Formation: 1948
- First holder: Malcolm C. Grow
- Website: Official website

The surgeon general of the Air Force and Space Force is the senior-most medical service officer in the United States Department of the Air Force and is the principal medical advisor for both the United States Air Force and United States Space Force. The surgeon general of the Air Force and Space Force is a lieutenant general who serves as head of the United States Air Force Medical Service (AFMS). The surgeon general is usually the senior Medical Corps officer, but acting surgeons general have been from other branches of the medical service. Prior to 2020, the position was known as just the surgeon general of the Air Force, but was renamed with the establishment of the Space Force.

== History ==
In September 1947 the combat elements of the Army Air Forces separated from the U.S. Army, forming the United States Air Force. But a few Air Force support functions, such as medical care, remained U.S. Army responsibilities for the next two years. Starting in 1948, the Air Force and the Air Surgeon, Maj. Gen. Malcolm C. Grow (1887-1960), began to convince the U.S. Army and the administration of President Harry S. Truman that the Air Force needed its own medical service. In the summer of 1949, Air Force General Order No. 35 established a medical service with the following officer personnel components: Medical Corps, Dental Corps, Veterinary Corps, Medical Service Corps, Air Force Nurse Corps, and Women's Medical Specialist Corps.

== List of surgeons general ==
No.	Surgeon General of the Air Force		Term		
No.	Portrait	Name	Took office	Left office	Term length
1	Malcolm C. Grow	Major General; Malcolm C. Grow	July 1, 1949	November 30, 1949	152 days
2	Harry G. Armstrong	Major General; Harry G. Armstrong	December 1, 1949	June 30, 1954	4 years, 211 days
3	Dan C. Ogle	Major General; Dan C. Ogle	July 1, 1954	November 30, 1958	4 years, 152 days
4	Oliver K. Niess	Major General; Oliver K. Niess	December 1, 1958	December 1, 1963	5 years
5	Richard L. Bohannon	Lieutenant General; Richard L. Bohannon	December 2, 1963	November 30, 1967	3 years, 363 days
6	Kenneth E. Pletcher	Lieutenant General; Kenneth E. Pletcher	December 1, 1967	April 30, 1970	2 years, 150 days
7	Alonzo A. Towner	Lieutenant General; Alonzo A. Towner	May 1, 1970	July 31, 1972	2 years, 91 days
8	Robert A. Patterson	Lieutenant General; Robert A. Patterson	August 1, 1972	July 31, 1975	2 years, 364 days
9	George E. Schafer	Lieutenant General; George E. Schafer	August 1, 1975	July 31, 1978	2 years, 364 days
10	Paul W. Myers	Lieutenant General; Paul W. Myers	August 1, 1978	July 31, 1982	3 years, 364 days
11	Max B. Bralliar	Lieutenant General; Max B. Bralliar	August 1, 1982	July 31, 1985	2 years, 364 days
12	Murphy A. Chesney	Lieutenant General; Murphy A. Chesney	August 1, 1985	July 31, 1988	2 years, 365 days
13	Monte B. Miller	Lieutenant General; Monte B. Miller	August 1, 1988	July 31, 1991	2 years, 364 days
14	Alexander M. Sloan	Lieutenant General; Alexander M. Sloan	August 1, 1991	July 11, 1994	2 years, 344 days
-	Robert A. Buethe	Major General; Robert A. Buethe; Acting	July 12, 1994	September 25, 1994	75 days
15	Edgar R. Anderson Jr.	Lieutenant General; Edgar R. Anderson Jr.	September 26, 1994	November 14, 1996	2 years, 49 days
16	Charles H. Roadman II	Lieutenant General; Charles H. Roadman II	November 15, 1996	October 10, 1999	2 years, 329 days
-	Michael K. Wyrick	Major General; Michael K. Wyrick; Acting	October 11, 1999	October 31, 1999	20 days
17	Paul K. Carlton Jr.	Lieutenant General; Paul K. Carlton Jr.	November 1, 1999	October 14, 2002	2 years, 347 days
18	George P. Taylor	Lieutenant General; George P. Taylor	October 15, 2002	July 31, 2006	3 years, 289 days
19	James G. Roudebush	Lieutenant General; James G. Roudebush	August 1, 2006	August 11, 2009	3 years, 10 days
20	Charles B. Green	Lieutenant General; Charles B. Green	August 12, 2009	July 19, 2012	2 years, 342 days
21	Thomas W. Travis	Lieutenant General; Thomas W. Travis	July 20, 2012	June 5, 2015	2 years, 320 days
22	Mark A. Ediger	Lieutenant General; Mark A. Ediger	June 6, 2015	June 4, 2018	2 years, 363 days
23	Dorothy A. Hogg	Lieutenant General; Dorothy A. Hogg	June 5, 2018	December 20, 2019	1 year, 198 days

No.	Surgeon General of the Air Force and Space Force		Term		
No.	Portrait	Name	Took office	Left office	Term length
23	Dorothy A. Hogg	Lieutenant General; Dorothy A. Hogg	December 20, 2019	June 4, 2021	1 year, 166 days
24	Robert I. Miller	Lieutenant General; Robert I. Miller	June 4, 2021	June 14, 2024	3 years, 10 days
-	John DeGoes	Major General; John DeGoes; Acting	June 14, 2024	July 31, 2024	47 days
25	John DeGoes	Lieutenant General; John DeGoes	July 31, 2024	Incumbent	2 years, 80 days

== List of deputy surgeons general ==
- Brig Gen Olin F. McIlnay, 1945?
- Brig Gen Harry G. Armstrong, June 1949 – December 1949
- Brig Gen Dan C. Ogle, December 1949 – July 1954
- Maj Gen John K. Cullen, August 1959 – June 1961
- Maj Gen Richard L. Bohannon, June 1961 – December 1963
- Maj Gen Alonzo A. Towner, July 1966 – May 1970
- Maj Gen Maxwell Wensel Steel Jr., September 1, 1972 – August 1975
- Maj Gen Benjamin R. Baker, August 1975 – December 1976
- Maj Gen Garth B. Dettinger, December 1976 – May 1980
- Maj Gen James G. Sanders, October 1988 – October 1991
- Maj Gen Leonard M. Randolph Jr., November 1999 – July 2001
- Maj Gen James G. Roudebush, July 2001 – July 2006
- Maj Gen Charles B. Green, August 2006 – August 2009
- Maj Gen Byron C. Hepburn, August 2009 – November 2010
- Maj Gen Thomas W. Travis, November 2010 – July 2012
- Maj Gen Mark A. Ediger, July 2012 – June 2015
- Maj Gen Dorothy A. Hogg, June 2015 – June 2018
- Maj Gen Sean L. Murphy, June 2018 – June 2021
- Maj Gen John DeGoes, June 2021 – July 2024

== See also ==
- Surgeon General of the United States
- Surgeon General of the United States Army
- Surgeon General of the United States Navy
