= William Kilpatrick Stewart =

Scottish researcher in aerospace physiology

- Born: 28 June 1913; Hamilton, Lanarkshire, Scotland
- Died: 2 May 1967 (aged 53); RAF Hospital Uxbridge, England
- Military career
- Allegiance: United Kingdom
- Branch: Royal Air Force
- Service years: 1939–1967
- Rank: Air vice-marshal
- Commands: RAF Institute of Aviation Medicine
- Conflicts: Second World War
- Awards: Companion of the Order of the Bath; Commander of the Order of the British Empire; Air Force Cross
- Website: https://www.williamkilpatrickstewart.com/

Air Vice Marshal William Kilpatrick Stewart, CB, CBE, AFC, QHP (28 June 1913 – 2 May 1967) was a Scottish researcher in aerospace physiology, senior consultant in physiology to the Royal Air Force, and commanding officer of the RAF Institute of Aviation Medicine.

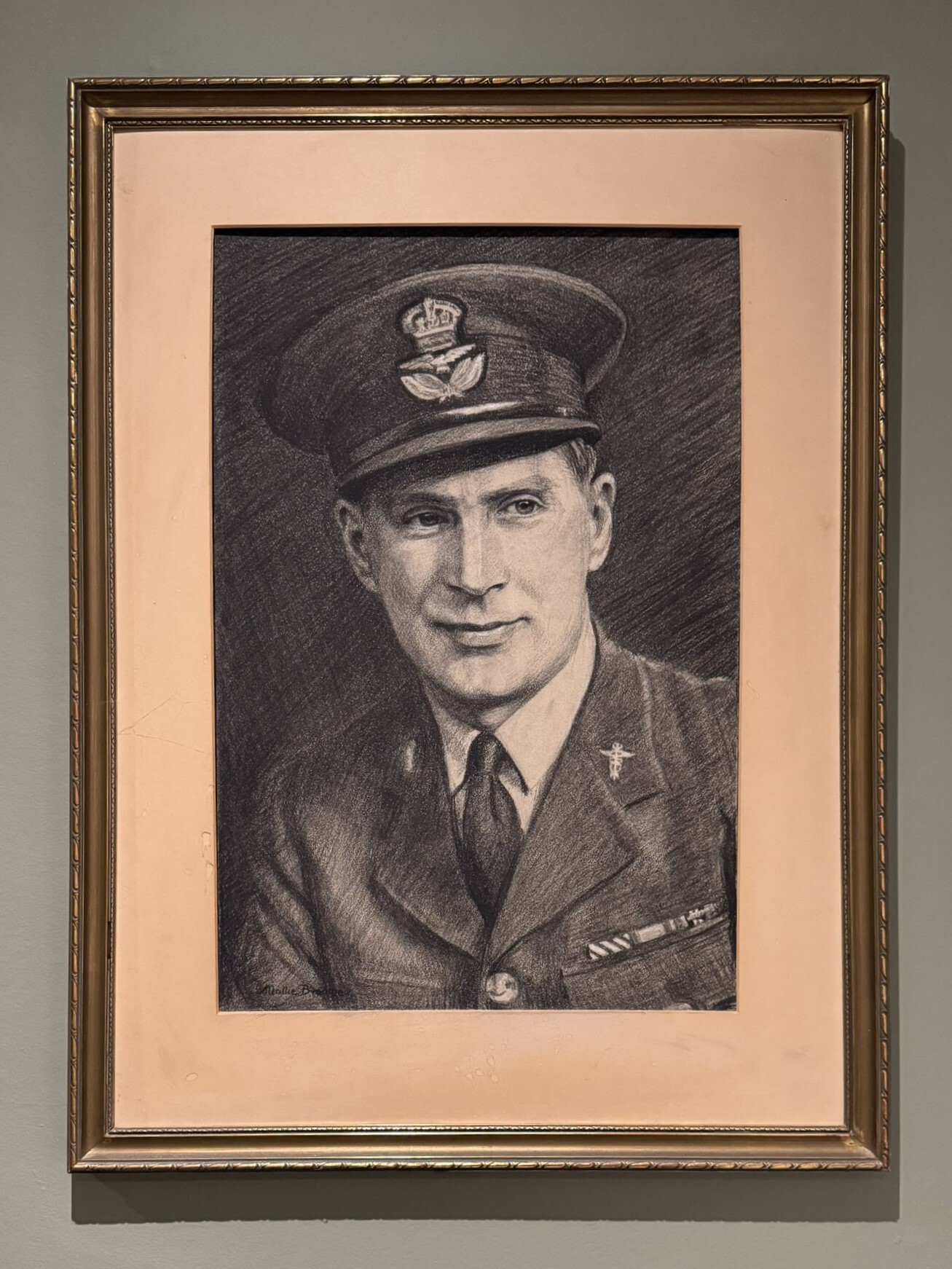
Portrait of William Kilpatrick Stewart, Royal Air Force medical officer and aviation physiologist. The image depicts Stewart in RAF uniform, wearing a peaked service cap and medical insignia, during the Second World War period. Stewart was a pioneering figure in aviation medicine whose research on high-altitude physiology, acceleration, and aircrew survival contributed significantly to the development of modern aerospace medicine and flight safety standards.

== Early life and education ==
William Kilpatrick Stewart was born the son of Dr. John Stewart at Hamilton, Lanarkshire. He attended Hamilton Academy. He then matriculated at Glasgow University, graduating in medicine in 1936.

== Career ==
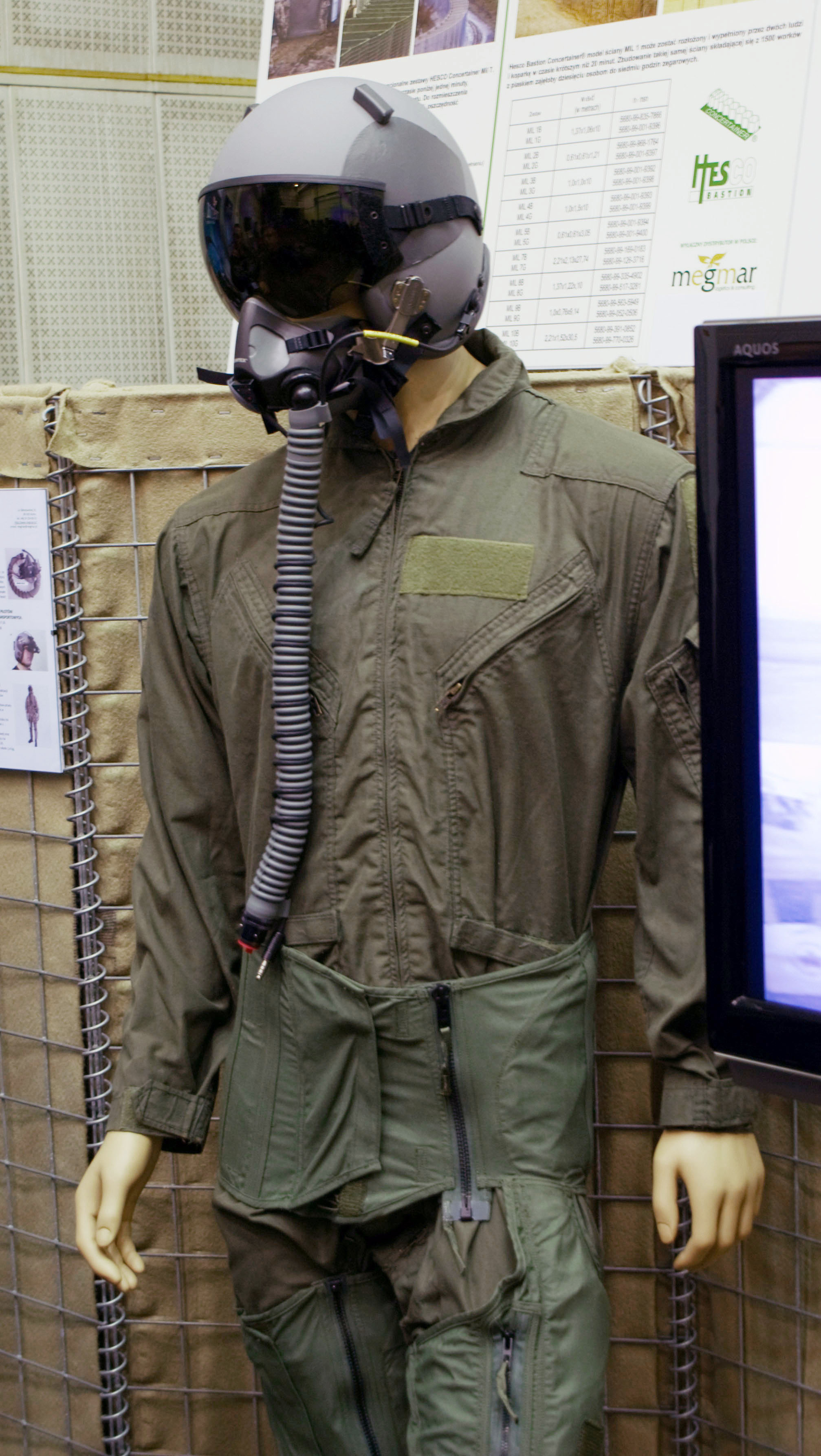
Example of a G suit, the MSF830 Anti-G Suit

After appointments in Glasgow Western Infirmary, Stewart became MRC Research Fellow at the University of Cambridge, working under Lord Adrian and Sir Bryan Matthews. Joining the Royal Air Force Volunteer Reserve in 1939, he was appointed to the RAF Physiology Laboratory at Farnborough in 1940. During the Second World War, Stewart conducted original research into the physiological effects of acceleration and deceleration, extreme heat and cold and decompression, and was engaged in the design of the ejector seat, G suits and oxygen systems. He had a Fairey Battle aircraft converted into a flying mini-laboratory, and he himself flew some 300 test flights, using himself as a 'guinea pig' in his research. He was awarded the Air Force Cross in 1941.

Stewart was involved in an aeroplane crash, in which he was the only survivor out of eight men. The aircraft flew too high into a storm, broke down and Stewart used his parachute to safely descend to the ground. He landed in Yorkshire.

Following the end of the Second World War, Stewart was instrumental in the successful establishment and operation of the RAF Institute of Aviation Medicine at Farnborough, and in 1946 was appointed its commanding officer. He was also an honorary lecturer in aviation physiology at the University of Glasgow.

== Honours, death and legacy ==
In 1956, Stewart was awarded the Sir Charles Wakefield Gold Medal of the Royal Aeronautical Society, and in 1961 the Theodore C. Lyster award of the Aerospace Medical Association of the United States.

Stewart was invested as a Commander of the Order of the British Empire in 1953, Companion of the Order of the Bath in 1964 and appointed an Honorary Physician to HM Queen Elizabeth II on 5 July 1966. He died, at the RAF Hospital Uxbridge, England, 2 May 1967. In 1969 the Stewart Lecture at the Royal Aeronautical Society, London, was established in his memory. The Stewart Lecture and the Stewart Memorial Prize are managed by the Stewart Trust, a charitable trust established in his name.
