= United States Air Force School of Aerospace Medicine =

American military medical training school

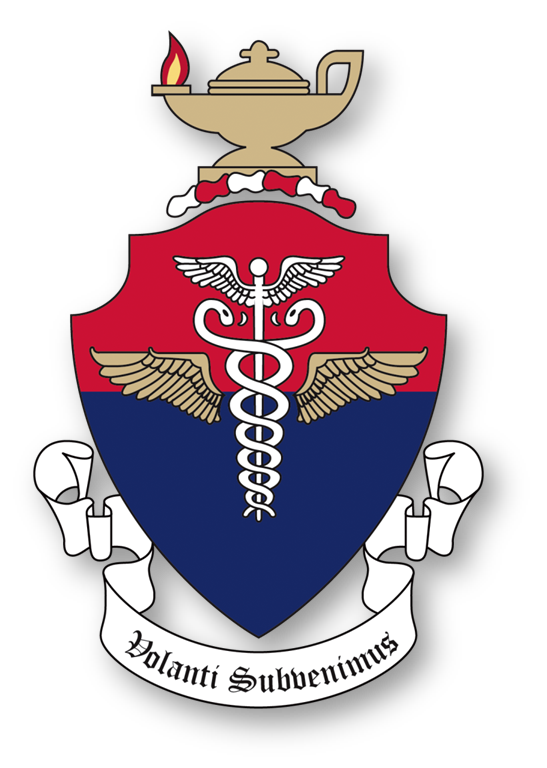
Shield of USAFSAM – created 21 March 1925

The United States Air Force School of Aerospace Medicine (USAFSAM) is the United States Air Force (USAF) organization focused on education, research, and operational consultation in aerospace and operational medicine. USAFSAM was founded in 1918 to conduct research into the medical and physiologic domains related to human flight, and as a school for medical officers trained to support military aviation operations, later coined as flight surgeons. The school supported early military aviation from World War I through the evolution of aviation and into the modern era. USAFSAM conducted medical research and provided medical support for the initial US space operations beginning in 1947 through the establishment of NASA in 1958. After the creation of NASA, USAFSAM continued to actively support civilian and military crewed space missions through clinical and physiologic research. USAFSAM is one of the oldest continually operating school for flight surgeons and other operational medical personnel of its kind in the world. USAFSAM is located in Dayton, Ohio, at Wright-Patterson Air Force Base, and is part of the 711th Human Performance Wing (711 HPW) and the Air Force Research Laboratory (AFRL).

== Mission ==
=== Education ===
USAFSAM provides in-residence and distance learning courses graduating approximately 4000 students annually. Initial skills training is provided for enlisted and officers in the disciplines of public health and preventive medicine, Bioenvironmental Engineering, aerospace physiology, aeromedical evacuation for nurses and enlisted medical technicians, flight and operational medicine, and critical care air transport team (CCATT) treatment. Advanced and refresher courses are provided in these same disciplines as well as pre-deployment critical care refresher training for surgeons, critical care nurses, respiratory therapists, emergency department physicians, anesthesiologists, and other primary care providers. A two-year Accreditation Council for Graduate Medical Education (ACGME) accredited clinical residency in Aerospace Medicine is provided for Physicians. And a six-month fellowship in Aerospace Medicine for International Officers is conducted each year. USAFSAM is host to the largest aeromedical library in the US – the Franzello Aeromedical Library. In 2010, 65 students from 46 countries attended courses at USAFSAM.

- Classrooms Over 500,000 square feet of classroom and laboratory space

- Centrifuge USAFSAM provides initial and refresher acceleration training for all USAF fast-jet aviators in a man-rated centrifuge. The centrifuge exposes subject to up to 9Gs (g-forces), or 9 times the normal force of gravity, to teach the effects of G-forces on human physiology and to measure the subject's ability to counteract the effects and prevent G-induced loss of consciousness (G-LOC). When USAFSAM relocated to Wright-Patterson AFB in 2011 the new centrifuge construction at Wright-Patterson AFB was not complete. USAFSAM has continued using the centrifuge located at Brooks City Base in San Antonio, Texas while awaiting completion of construction of the new centrifuge on Wright Patterson AFB. When complete, the USAFSAM centrifuge at Wright-Patterson AFB will be the only man-rated centrifuge in the Department of Defense and will provide acceleration training for all USAF fast-jet aviators.

- Training Altitude Chambers The USAFSAM operates two training altitude chambers to provide initial hypoxia training to all flight surgeons, flight nurses, aerospace physiologists, aeromedical evacuation technicians, and aerospace physiology technicians. Refresher training to is also provided to trained aircrew in the region.

- Reduced Oxygen Breathing Device (ROBD) The ROBD is a device that mixes breathing air with nitrogen to produce sea-level equivalent atmospheric oxygen content for higher altitudes. The USAFSAM ROBD provides hypoxia training to aircrew, similar to that provided in the altitude chamber, without the decreased pressure and risk of altitude exposure.

- Fuselage Simulators USAFSAM utilizes a C-17, T-767, and four C-130 aircraft fuselage trainers to provide current and realistic learning environments.

- Aeromedical Aviation Laboratory The Department of Aerospace Medicine operates an Aeromedical Aviation Laboratory in support of the Aerospace Medicine Primary Course and the Residency in Aerospace Medicine (RAM). The Aviation Laboratory is located at Greene County Airport with civilian flight instructors who are all prior USAF pilots. Students receive training in Cirrus SR-22 and Pitts S2B aircraft. Students complete aeromedical and flying ground training and then receive seven flights following didactic curriculum. Approximately 500-600 students are trained in the Aerospace Aviation Laboratory each year.

- Air Force Center for Expeditionary Team Training Basic Expeditionary Medical Readiness Training is provided for medical personnel prior to military deployment through the Center for Sustainment of Trauma and Readiness Skills (C-STARS) provided on site at partner medical facilities in Baltimore, Maryland; Cincinnati, Ohio; and St. Louis, Missouri.

=== Consultation ===
USAFSAM provides consultative support to all USAF bases in the disciplines listed above fielding approximately 5000 requests and over 2.3M laboratory tests annually.

The Aeromedical Consultation Service The Aeromedical Consult Service (ACS) provides medical opinion to USAF and Major Command (MAJCOM) leaders regarding medical selection of aviators and individual waivers of aeromedical standards, and informs policy decisions regarding risks of medical conditions and therapies in military aviation and special operational duty environments. Among the ACS staff are specialists in the aeromedical facets of such fields as cardiology, pulmonology, neurology, ophthalmology, psychiatry, and neuropsychology.

The Epidemiology Consultation Service The Epidemiology Consult Service provides global consultation services to the USAF and Department of Defense in public health surveillance, epidemiology, and preventive medicine, with capabilities for rapid on-site epidemiologic assistance for outbreak response. Specific areas of consultation expertise include entomology, food safety/defense, clinical reference laboratory and diagnostic testing services, USAF active duty and retiree mortality surveillance, influenza and respiratory disease surveillance, tuberculosis and other disease risk assessments, as well as reportable disease and medical event collection.

The Epidemiology Laboratory The Epidemiology Laboratory is the USAF's only clinical reference laboratory offering clinical diagnostic, public health and force health screening testing for sustainment of the USAF beneficiary population. The laboratory provides immunodiagnostic, virology, microbiology, and molecular testing capabilities to enable autoimmune, infectious disease, and chronic disease diagnoses, as well as health surveillance. Additionally, it provides Human Immunodeficiency Virus (HIV) and vaccination status testing to maintain DoD force readiness. The laboratory is the central facility for the DoD's Global Emerging Surveillance and Response Systems' influenza surveillance program and provides influenzastrain data annually to support national vaccine decisions. The laboratory is also a reference-level member of the Centers for Disease Control and Prevention's Laboratory Response Network and DoD's Defense Laboratory Network, providing biothreat agent identification capabilities in a biodefense response. And they operate a Biosafety Level 3 (BSL) facility for safety in handling clinical specimens.

The Food Defense Laboratory The Food Defense Laboratory capabilities include analysis of epidemiologically linked suspect food samples submitted by base-level USAF public health personnel in response to clusters or outbreaks of foodborne illnesses. The laboratory collaborates with the Aeromedical Research Department to evaluate commercial off the shelf (COTS) technology that could be used by public health personnel to enhance pathogen detection and identification capabilities from food and the environment.

The Entomology Laboratory The Epidemiology Consult Service supports all USAF activities and Bases worldwide with rapid identification of arthropod pests and disease vectors. The Laboratory tests for the pathogens that cause malaria, West Nile, and Zika Fever as well as other arboviruses and parasites. Additionally, the Laboratory collaborates with the Aerospace Medicine Research Laboratory to conduct research on arthropods and arthropod-borne diseases, such as Lyme disease, to include arthropod testing in support of USAF public health consultations.

The Occupational and Environmental Consultation Service The Occupational and Environmental Consult Service provides total exposure health risk consultation in environmental and occupational health. Environmental consultation includes population and community health. Occupational health consultation includes stressors, such as ionizing radiation, lasers, electromagnetic field radiation, hazardous materials, noise, and ergonomic challenges found in the work and deployed environments. These services are provided at a multitude of venues, such as onsite consulting, development of technical guidance, telephonic consultation, collaborating with DoD and USAF on the development of policies/standards, formal collaborations with universities, and representing the USAF with national and international professional and standard setting organizations.

The Radioanalytical Laboratory The Radioanalytical Laboratory processes and analyzes environmental samples for ionizing radiation to meet Nuclear Regulatory Commission and other regulatory requirements. This includes air, soil, vegetation, water, bioassays, and swipe samples. The laboratory analyzes approximately 10,000 samples annually.

The Radiation Dosimetry Laboratory The Radiation Dosimetry Laboratory calibrates, distributes, and manages over 70,000 Thermolumenscent Dosimeters and 12,000 Electronic Personal Dosimeters for radiation workers and first responders worldwide. Data gathered from this equipment is entered into the Master Radiation Exposure Registry, providing a comprehensive dosimetry record for all personnel who use USAF dosimetry services, totaling over 3.9 million records.

The Industrial Hygiene Laboratory The Industrial Hygiene Laboratory provides oversight and guidance to enable USAF Bioenvironmental Engineering to perform occupational and environmental health risk assessments through analysis, consultation, and execution support. The Industrial Hygiene Laboratory oversees testing and data analysis for 15,000 samples annually.

The Proficiency Analytical Testing Laboratory The Proficiency Analytical Testing Laboratory enhances the ability of Bioenvironmental Engineering personnel worldwide to remain competent in utilizing field-portable analytical equipment to detect and identify unknown chemical and biological samples. The laboratory prepares and distributes 12,000 samples each year and evaluates and certifies results for 1,400 Bioenvironmental personnel.

The Operational Consult Service The Operational Consult Service is a multidisciplinary professional team which performs rapid research, studies, and analysis to answer emerging human factors questions from across the operational USAF.

=== Research ===
USAFSAM Aeromedical Research Department conducts research in four key areas:

En Route Care The En Route Care research team leads 711 HPW's research and consultation in the areas of aeromedical evacuation and expeditionary medicine, to include stabilizing battlefield trauma patients for transport and en route critical and routine care of the injured during strategic evacuation. The en route care research team oversees research at three C-STARS sites. Research conducted in this area addresses requirements including all elements of patient care and support functions during patient staging and transportation, beginning with receipt of initial request for patient/casualty movement until patient/casualty movement is no longer required. This includes research relevant to: En Route Patient Staging System (ERPSS), aeromedical evacuation (AE), CCATT, and Tactical Critical Care Evacuation Teams (TCCET).

Force Health Protection USAFSAM's Force Health Protection research addresses the need for timely, accurate, and actionable health risk characterization for health hazards related to flight and for injuries due to physical, chemical, biological, radiological, directed energy and other environmental threats. This research also identifies the cause of and adequate treatments for newly identified and rapidly evolving diseases, as well as the development of enhanced genetics/genomics capabilities to predict human and microbial susceptibility.

Human Performance The USAFSAM Human Performance Research Team leads the 711 HPW's aeromedical research and consultation in optimizing and maintaining physical and mental health and performance of Airmen. This team conducts research in the areas of altitude and acceleration, operational psychology, vision standards, and aircrew/operator performance. Human Performance research personnel oversee research activities on the only DoD centrifuge and in the unique research altitude chambers facility, as well as the Operational Based Vision Assessment (OBVA) Laboratory.

Expeditionary Medicine The USAFSAM Expeditionary Medicine Research Team leads the 711 HPW's research and consultation in supporting the health and performance of patients and providers across the spectrum of austere environments.

== History ==
=== The New York Chapter ===
The United States Air Force School of Aerospace Medicine began operations on January 19, 1918 at Hazelhurst Field, Mineola, Long Island as the Air Service Medical Research Laboratory under the leadership of Col. William H. Wilmer. The Hazelhurst Laboratory had a small decompression chamber and research was begun on human tolerance to lowered oxygen tension. The impetus for the creation of the lab was the entry of the United States into World War I on April 6, 1917 and the resulting increase in use of aircraft by military forces. As a result, on April 28, 1917, an Air Service Medical, Signal Corps, US Army was organized with General Theodore C. Lyster, Medical Corps, US Army, appointed to the newly created position of Chief Surgeon, Aviation Section, Signal Corps on September 6, 1917. One of the first observations made by General Lyster was the alarming mortality rate from aircraft accidents among flying cadets at training centers in the U.S. and with the Allies in France. In the first year of flying in World War I the English and French found that 2% of aircraft accidents were due to combat, 8% were caused by mechanical problems, and 90% were due to human failure.

Interest in reversing this trend led to the establishment of an Aviation Medical Research Board consisting of four Army Medical Corps officers to:

- Investigate all conditions that would affect the efficiency of pilots
- Develop and conduct experiments to determine the ability to fly at high altitudes
- Develop and conduct experiments on methods for delivering oxygen to pilots at high altitudes
- Act as a standing medical board for all matters relating to pilot fitness

The first action of the Aviation Medical Research Board was to direct construction of the Air Service Medical Research Laboratory at Hazelhurst Field on Long Island.

The term Flight Surgeon was adopted by the Hazelhurst Laboratory on March 11, 1918 to identify those physicians devoting themselves to the health and well-being of the flyers. Just two months later the first three students graduated as Flight Surgeons and were ordered to the field for duty. Capt. Robert J. Hunter arrived at his station first on May 8, 1918 and is considered the first flight surgeon. Major William R. Ream was the first Flight Surgeon killed on duty in an aviation accident on August 23, 1918.

In early August 1918, General John J. Pershing identified a need for medical assistance in France. There were approximately 3,000 American flyers in France and aircraft accidents accounted for 74.6% of the fatalities among aviators, with only 24.8% due to combat and only 0.6% to disease. In response the Air Service Medical Research Laboratory deployed 34 officers and 13 enlisted men to Issoudun, France. There they found the physical and mental health of the pilots in poor condition. The team from the Research Laboratory employed lessons learned from their work in the laboratory and by October 1918 there was a marked improvement in health and morale among aircrew and a reduction in the aircraft accident rate.

After the redeployment of the Laboratory following the Armistice, most of the laboratory staff were reassigned or returned to civilian life and in January 1919 Maj Louis H. Bauer replaced Colonel Wilmer as the Director of the Laboratory under a new name, The Medical Research Laboratory and School for Flight Surgeons and at a new location at Mitchel Field, Long Island. Maj. Bauer established a permanent course of instruction for flight surgeons and the first regular class of 2-months duration was begun in May 1919.

In February 1921 the War Department recognized The School for Flight Surgeons as a Special Service School, giving it equal status with the Medical Research Laboratory. On November 8, 1922, the Air Service Medical research Laboratory and School for Flight Surgeons was designated as The School of Aviation Medicine.

=== The first Texas Chapter ===
Maj. Francis H. Poole succeeded Major Bauer as the Commandant of the School of Aviation Medicine in 1925. In August 1926 the School was moved to Brooks Field, San Antonio, Texas. Just five years later it was moved across town to Randolph Field in October 1931.

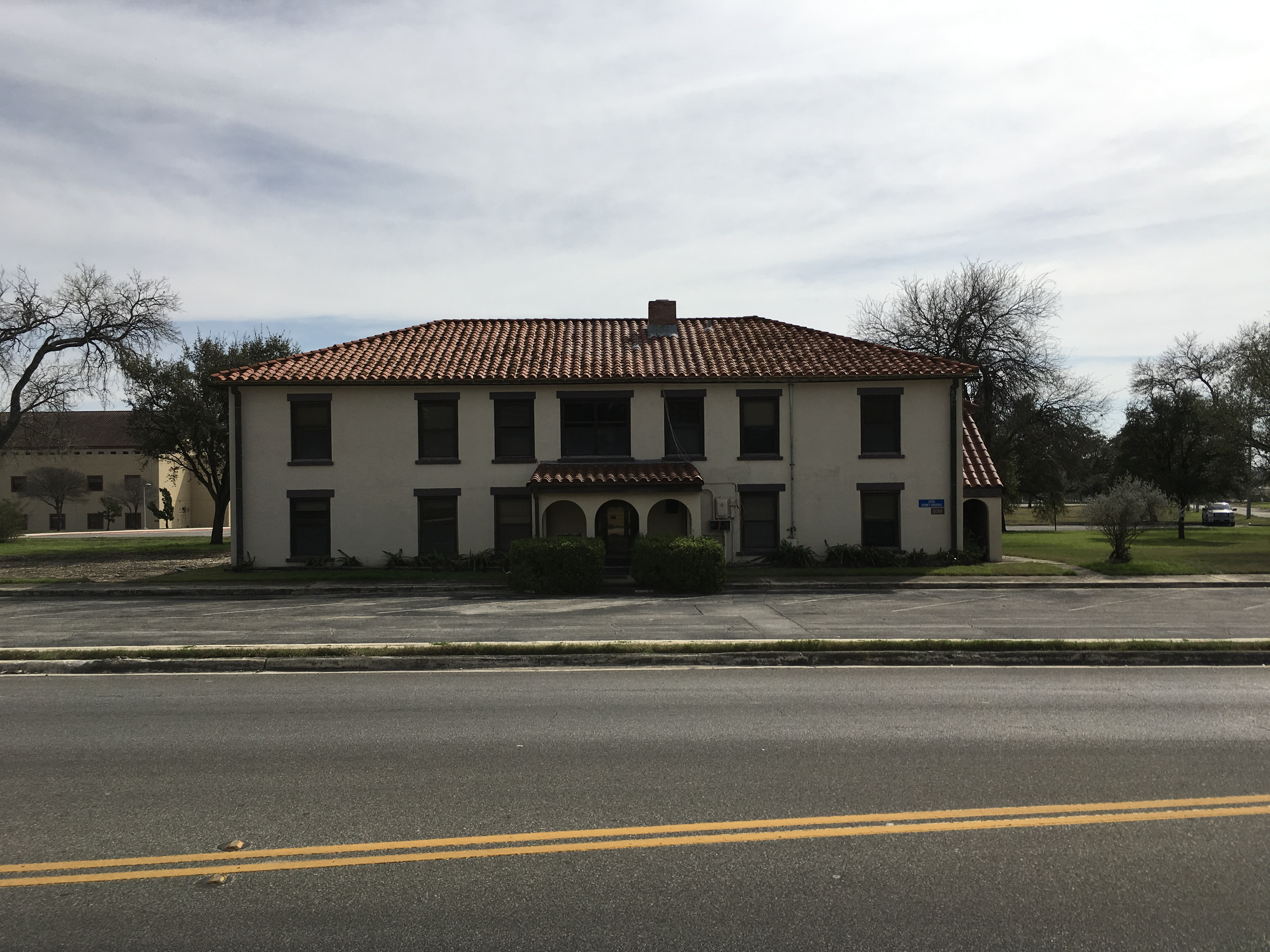
USAFSAM from 1921 to 1931 on Brooks Field, San Antonio, Texas. Photo taken February 2017

In 1934 it was recognized that there was overlap in research topics between the School of Aviation Medicine and the Physiological Research Unit, Material Division, Wright Field, Dayton, Ohio. A division of focus was agreed upon between the two research units with the Material Division taking responsibility for the development of equipment, and the School focusing on personnel factors having to do with selection, classification, and maintenance of the flyer.

With the onset of war in Europe the United States began mobilizing its forces in 1940 which resulted in an expansion of personnel and funding for the School. On January 20, 1942, a Research Department was formally established by the School Commandant Brig. Gen Eugen G. Reinartz MC with Maj. Harry G. Armstrong MC as the director. Included in this new research department were branches for physiology, psychology, psychiatry, biochemistry, biophysics, pharmacology, ophthalmology, clinical investigation, otolaryngology, pathology, statistics, physical education and dentistry. An Aeromedical Library was newly established to support this research effort. The new research building on Randolph Field was officially opened on April 2, 1943.

In January 1943, the Army Air Corps School of Air Evacuation was transferred to the School of Aviation Medicine from Bowman Field, Kentucky, linking the training of flight nurses with aeromedical education and research.

After the war Colonel (Maj Gen) Harry G. Armstrong took over as Commandant of the School on 18 July 1946. He had previously established and served as Director of the Aero Medical Laboratory at Wright Field from 1935 through 1940, and then as Director of the Research Department at the School of Aviation Medicine (1941–1942) before serving as the Surgeon of the Air Division at the Office of Military Government for Germany in Berlin (1942–1946).

On April 1, 1946, the School was transferred from the Air Training Command to Air University Command and became the graduate medical department of the Air University, the educational and doctrinal center of the Air Force.

In August 1946, Colonel (Maj Gen) Armstrong formally proposed the establishment of an Aeromedical Center to provide for the teaching, research, and clinical practice of aviation medicine. On June 21, 1949, an Aeromedical Planning Board was commissioned by the Surgeon General to formulate plans for an Aeromedical Center. The findings and recommendations of the Board were released in September 1949 as the Report of the Aeromedical Planning Board on an Aeromedical Center and were the basis for the School complex constructed later at Brooks Field, San Antonio, Texas.

=== The Texas and Alabama Chapter ===
By 1950 the School had outgrown its space on Randolph Field in San Antonio, Texas so portions of the education activities were temporarily placed at Gunter Air Force Base, Montgomery, Alabama. The headquarters for the School remained at Randolph Air Force Base along with the Research Department and the Primary and Advanced Courses in Aviation Medicine, while the Flight Nurse Course, Physiological Training Officers Course, and all enlisted courses were transferred to the 3882nd School Group, Gunter Branch-School of Aviation Medicine.

In March 1950 a Radiobiological Laboratory was established at Austin, Texas as a joint venture between USAFSAM and the University of Texas which looked at the effects of ionizing radiation on living organisms and the prevention and treatment of radiation injury. They worked closely with the Atomic Energy Commission at Oak Ridge, Tennessee and their work resulted in many advances in knowledge important to this new field of study.

In July 1952 Public Law 534 was passed by the 82nd Congress which authorized $8,000,000 for construction of facilities (The Aeromedical Center) for the School of Aviation Medicine at Brooks Air Force Base, Texas.

On 24 October 1952, the mission of the School was expanded from education and research to include consultation with the establishment of the Aeromedical Consult Service.

Another milestone was achieved on 8 February 1953 when the American Board of Preventive Medicine was authorized by the American Medical Association to establish aviation medicine as a specialty in the field of preventive medicine and to grant specialty certification in aviation medicine.

On 10 May 1957, the groundbreaking ceremony was held for the construction of the New School of Aviation Medicine at Brooks Air Force Base, San Antonio, Texas

Space medicine research began at the School in 1947 conducted by Hubertus Strughold who was previously the Director of the Aeromedical Research Institute in Berlin from 1935 to 1945. And Heinz Haber, an Astrophysicist. Their work matured leading to the creation of the Department of Space Medicine within the School on 9 Feb 1949. In November 1951 USAFSAM, in collaboration with the Lovelace Foundation for Medical Education and Research in Albuquerque, New Mexico, jointly organized and sponsored an international Symposium on the Physics and Medicine of the Upper Atmosphere. The meeting was held in San Antonio Texas and the results of the symposium were published in a book entitled Physics and Medicine of the Upper Atmosphere with 21 chapters from 34 collaborating scientists.

In October 1954 USAFSAM took delivery of a sealed cabin simulator for space research. The simulator modeled the inside of a space vehicle and was built to study humans in a closed ecological system at simulated heights of 80,000 feet and above. Experiments were conducted in the simulator beginning in January 1956 leading to Airman Donald F. Farrell remaining enclosed in the simulator for 7 continuous days in February 1958. Following the launch of Sputnik in 1957, the U.S. pursued both civilian and military crewed space programs with the USAF tasked with the military effort. In July 1958 the USAFSAM Department of Space Medicine was reorganized as the Division of Space Medicine with 4 Departments. Col Paul A. Campbell served as the first Chief of the Division of Space Medicine.

The USAF focused on plans for a military space station, the Manned Orbiting Laboratory (MOL). The MOL was designed to be an earth-orbiting space station and would use a modified Gemini capsule attached to a cylinder-shaped laboratory. The MOL missions were planned to be up to 30 days. The MOL never launched a space mission, but the USAFSAM MOL studies of man in space for extended periods of time in preparation for MOL missions were used by NASA in the operation of Skylab. And much of the work in space food, radiation studies, space cabin atmospheres, and pressure suits were adopted by NASA during the Gemini and Apollo missions. The MOL program was canceled in 1969 to reduce defense spending. Both the military and civilian crewed space programs resulted in major expansion of the research facilities and capabilities at the Brooks Aeromedical Center:

- A hospital ward for bed rest studies to simulate the effects of microgravity. The protective measures employed during the space-shuttle era evolved directly from 20 years of joint studies by NASA and USAFSAM on altitude-decompression sickness.
- A human centrifuge for the study of rapid onset acceleration for fighter pilots and for astronaut launch and re-entry. Beginning in 1991 all astronauts were trained for G-exposure at USAFSAM.
- Multiple altitude chambers of various sizes including a one-man chamber capable of rapid decompression to test get-me-down pressure suits.
- Laboratories for the study of body fluids and foods and nutrition for space flight.
- A Manned Orbiting Laboratory simulator. There were 90 MOL related research projects conducted at Brooks before the cancellation of the program in 1969. The information gleaned from these experiments contributed to the Apollo program and some equipment resulting from the MOL studies were later flown on Skylab during 1973 and 1974.

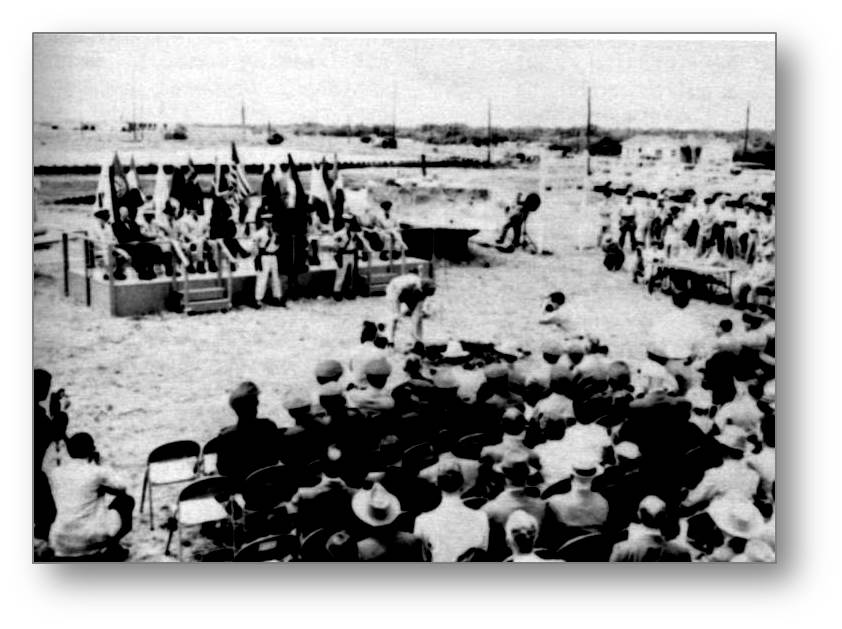
Ground Breaking Ceremony for USAFSAM, Brooks Air Force Base, San Antonio, Texas on 10 May 1957

=== The second Texas Chapter ===
The first Primary Course in Aviation Medicine was held at the new campus on Brooks AFB 11 August 1959.

On 8 August 1961 the School name was changed to The School of Aerospace Medicine.

On 21 November 1963, President John F. Kennedy dedicated the new school complex at Brooks Air Force Base, Texas the day before he was assassinated in Dallas, Texas. This was Kennedy's last official act as president and the location of his famous cap over the wall speech inviting the nation to embrace space exploration.

Frank O'Connor, the Irish writer, tells in one of his books how, as a boy, he and his friends would make their way across the countryside, and when they came to an orchard wall that seemed too high and too doubtful to try and too difficult to permit their voyage to continue, they took off their hats and tossed them over the wall--and then they had no choice but to follow them. This Nation has tossed its cap over the wall of space, and we have no choice but to follow it. Whatever the difficulties, they will be overcome. Whatever the hazards, they must be guarded against. With the vital help of this Aerospace Medical Center, with the help of all those who labor in the space endeavor, with the help and support of all Americans, we will climb this wall with safety and with speed-and we shall then explore the wonders on the other side.

In 1996 a new School-house on Brooks Air Force Base was completed (building 775).

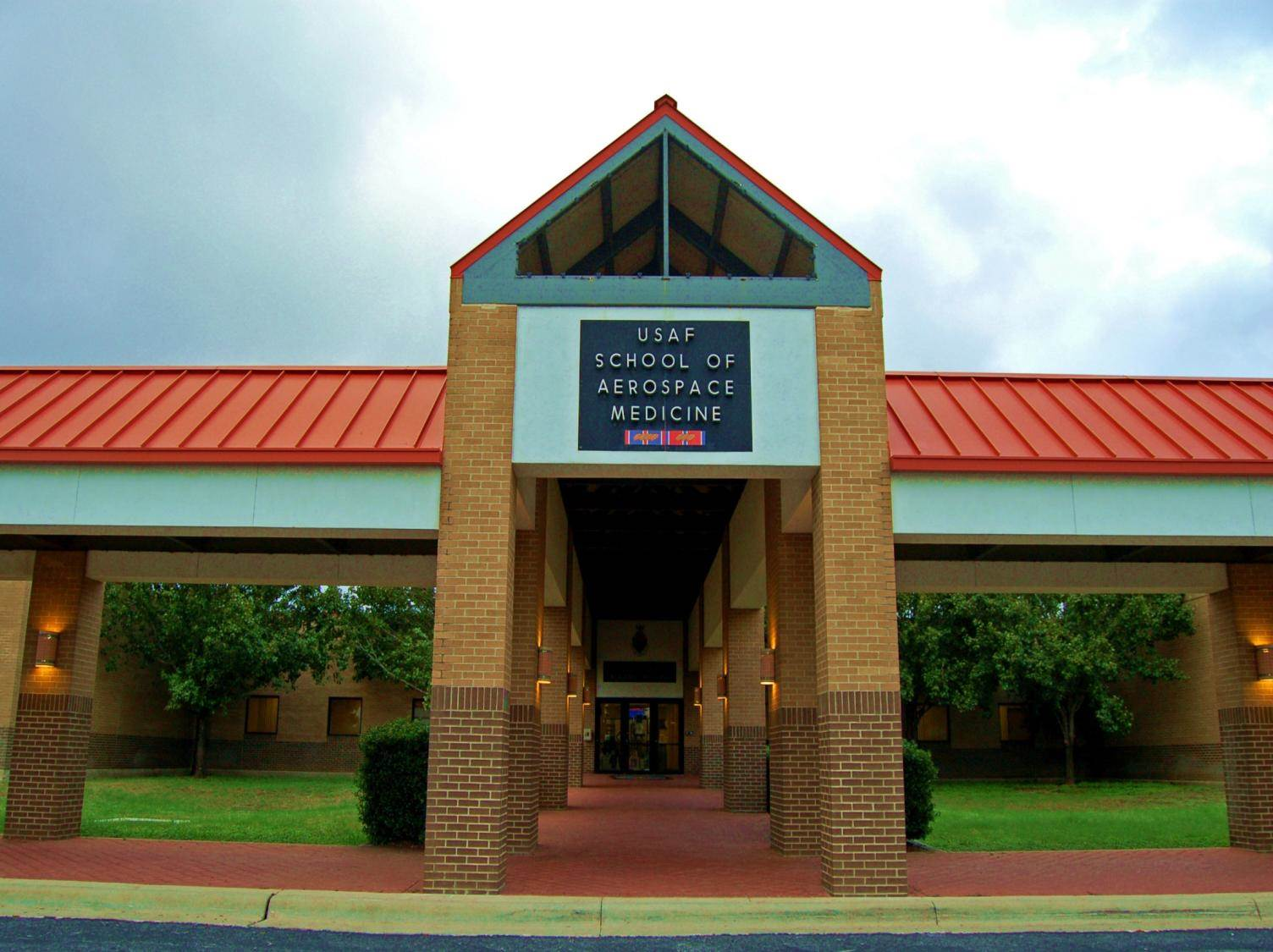
USAFSAM from 1996 through 2011. Building 775 located on Brooks AFB

=== The Ohio Chapter ===
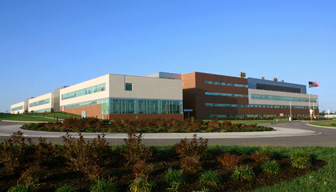
USAFSAM Building as part of the 711 HPW campus on Wright-Patterson AFB, Ohio

In 2005 the Defense Base Closure and Realignment Commission (BRAC) commission ordered the removal of the Air Force mission from Brooks City Base and the activation of the 711th Human Performance Wing at Wright Patterson AFB in Dayton, Ohio. The new wing combined the Air Force Research Laboratory's Human Effectiveness Directorate with USAFSAM, and the 311th Performance Enhancement Directorate in a 3-Directorate wing: Human Effectiveness Directorate, School of Aerospace Medicine, and the Human Systems Integration Directorate

== Significant Aeromedical Accomplishments ==
14 October 1947 The T-1 partial pressure suit's development marked a milestone when Captain Chuck Yeager wore the skin-tight garment made from nylon and cotton during the flight of the first rocket-powered airplane, the X-1, at Edwards AFB, California. While Capt. Yeager broke the sound barrier in the X-1 that day, more importantly the T-1 partial pressure suit contributed to his survival. Aerospace medicine pioneer Harry Armstrong, who became the Air Force's second Surgeon General, initiated the development of the T-1 in 1943 in collaboration with contractor James P. Henry, a University of Southern California physiologist. The suit was completed at the end of World War II at the Aero Medical Laboratory that Armstrong had founded at Wright Field, Ohio. The T-1 served as the model for subsequent Air Force partial pressure suits needed by aircrews in advanced high performance aircraft.

9 February 1949 The world's first Department of Space Medicine established at the U.S. Air Force School of Aerospace Medicine at Randolph AFB, San Antonio, Texas. Harry Armstrong created the venue for pioneering studies in human physiology relating to space flight partly because technological advances in high altitude aircraft had taken man to the fringes of space. The Department of Space Medicine's space cabin simulation of environmental systems and weightlessness experiments contributed immeasurably to America's early space flight program following the inception of NASA in 1958.

Mid-1952 Aeromedical evacuation development marked a milestone when U.S. Air Force School of Aerospace Medicine scientists Syrrel Wilks and J.F. Tomashefski created the world's first air transportable iron lung. Adapted from Philip Drinker and Louis Shaw's 1928 invention of a large metal tank used to assist respiration in infantile paralysis patients, the SAM (School of Aviation Medicine) lung was the only air-worthy transportable iron lung in America during the last major polio epidemic in the United States. Air Force aeromedical evacuation crews routinely transported countless polio victims using the SAM lung. The SAM lung paved the way for another aerospace medicine breakthrough when School of Aviation Medicine scientist Forrest Bird invented the respirator/ventilator that bears his name.

8 February 1953 Aviation medicine is accepted as a specialty by the American Medical Association (AMA) meeting in Chicago, Illinois, marking a milestone in a medical field that originated in America in 1917 when aviation medicine pioneer Theodore Lyster established the School of Aviation Medicine at Hazelhurst Field, Mineola, Long Island, New York Its recognition as a specialty by AMA's Advisory Board for Medical Specialties and the Council on Medical Education and Hospitals contributed to the development of formal training programs that led to medical certification in what became aerospace medicine. Its acceptance as a specialty within the medical profession had an enormous impact on the recruitment, retention and professional development of flight surgeons.

Early 1960 Thomas Tredici and Donald Pitts developed a gold visor which protected the eyes from harmful ultraviolet and infrared radiation. NASA used the visor in the face shield of its Apollo astronauts who landed on the moon. Without the visor, the astronauts would have been temporarily blinded by infrared radiation and unable to perform their missions.

Early 1960 Air Force aerospace medicine led a worldwide revival in the use of hyperbaric oxygen therapy to treat a variety of life-threatening medical disorders with the first successful hyperbaric treatment at Langley AFB, Virginia of a pilot suffering from decompression sickness. This event led to the creation of the Air Force Hyperbaric Center at Brooks AFB in San Antonio, Texas in 1963. What had begun as an Air Force program designed to treat aviators victimized by decompression sickness, blossomed by the 1970s into a clinical research juggernaut that has had a profound and lasting impact on public health. Air Force aerospace medicine innovations spawned advances in the treatment of non-healing wounds, carbon monoxide poisoning, air and gas embolisms, crush injuries, bone infections, anemia, radiation-induced tissue necrosis, compromised skin grafts, thermal burns and destructive soft tissue infections. One of hyperbaric medicine's greatest breakthroughs was made at Brooks AFB by Air Force nurse (Capt.) Michaela Shafer who discovered that hypoglycemia, not oxygen toxicity, caused seizures in diabetic patients receiving hyperbaric therapy. In 2003, the U.S. Air Force School of Aerospace Medicine made Department of Defense history when its hyperbaric medicine facility was nationally accredited.

December 1973 USAFSAM developed a portable therapeutic liquid oxygen (LOX) breathing system to provide a portable, low pressure, therapeutic oxygen system for use on aeromedical aircraft that did not have an integrated therapeutic oxygen system.
Late 1976 The USAF began its global influenza surveillance of U.S. military forces and their families through the Project Gargle program. Since 1997, these efforts have been expanded with the Department of Defense's development of the Global Laboratory-Based Influenza Surveillance Program that has supported the Centers for Disease Control and Prevention (CDC) through its contributions to the development of worldwide influenza vaccines. Aerospace medicine disease surveillance, testing and detection techniques have contributed over the years to global public health. The 311th Human Systems Wing's Air Force Institute for Environment, Safety and Occupational Health Risk Analysis' Epidemiology Surveillance Division (now part of USAFSAM) contributed to global disease detection during the first decade of the 21st century when it helped the CDC and World Health Organization monitor and test for the Severe Acute Respiratory Syndrome virus, commonly called SARS, as well as supported global surveillance of Avian Flu.

Late 1977 Air Force aerospace medicine's pioneering contributions to cardiovascular disease research continued when a multi-year study was launched to scientifically understand the epidemiology of cardiovascular disease in the context of aviation. The study, which focused on older aviators, determined aviation-related conditions that posed the most risk to aviation safety with the fulfilled goal of providing 'safe to fly' outcomes that improved aviation utilization and helped extend the careers of veteran aviators. This study was part of a series of aerospace medicine initiatives that greatly contributed to scientific understanding of cardiovascular disease. Among other Air Force studies that contributed to cardiovascular disease research was the Heart Evaluation and Risk Tabulation (HEART) program that involved early diagnosis of heart attacks and strokes in flying personnel. HEART, which provided the basis for new, effective preventive health dietary programs for military and civilian communities, led to the Air Force Coronary Arteriosclerosis Prevention Study that was one of the first of its kind in the U.S. to study risk factors for cardiovascular disease in pilots in their 40s and 50s.

Mid-1979 USAFSAM scientist John Taboada discovered the effects of excimer laser exposure to living eye tissue which led to the development of Photo Refractive Keratechemy (PRK). Short pulse laser energy produced re-surfacing and healing of corneal tissue. Taboada's discovery was serendipitous in that his experiment was designed to measure excimer laser bioeffects. At the time, the Air Force was interested in using excimer lasers in powering the production of powerful green lasers used in long distance communications. Taboada's PRK discovery, which provided the basis for subsequent LASIK surgery, had a tremendous impact on correcting myopia, the nearsightedness that a quarter of Americans experience. In 1995, the Food and Drug Administration approved PRK. The Air Force approved PRK in 2001.

1980s era Air Force acceleration research at Brooks AFB made great aerospace medicine strides that contributed to aviator safety and survivability. G-force research pioneers including Sid Leverett, George Mohr, Russell Burton and Kent Gillingham significantly enhanced aircrew survival through initiatives that produced the Advanced Technology Anti-G suit (ATAGS), the high pressure ready flow anti-G valve, anti-G pilot conditioning program to reduce the potential for G-loss of consciousness (G-LOC) and subsequent improvements to aviator helmet/oxygen mask ensembles that provided positive pressure breathing such as Combat Edge.

August 1982 Scientists at Brooks were instrumental in the development and testing of the on-board oxygen generation system (OBOGS) that was first flown in August 1982 on an F-16.

1990s era Aerospace medicine's support and development of critical care in the air marked its first major milestone in 1997 with the USAFSAM's inception of the Critical Care Air Transport Team (CCATT) program that integrated Air Force aeromedical operations worldwide. CCATT was created in response to a shift in Air Force aeromedical evacuation doctrine following the first Persian Gulf War. The shift involving patient care from "return to duty" to "evacuate and replace" provided the impetus for CCATT's development as a training program that emphasized stabilizing patients in the aeromedical evacuation system. CCATT's development has since expanded the Air Force's aeromedical clinical transport capabilities by providing intensive care unit support on board transport aircraft.

== Previous Commanders of the School of Aerospace Medicine ==
Years	Name
1917–1919	Colonel William H. Wilmer
1919–1925	Major Louis H. Bauer MD
1926–1930	Major Francis A. Poole
1930–1932	Major Benjamin B. Warrimer
1932–1933	Lt Colonel Albert P. Clarke
1934–1937	Colonel Arnold D. Tuttle
1937–1939	Colonel Coleridge L. Beaven
1939–1941	Lt Colonel Fabian L. Pratt
1941–1946	Brig. Gen. Eugen G. Reinartz MD
1946–1949	Brig. Gen. Harry G. Armstrong MD
1949–1953	Brig. Gen. Otis O. Benson Jr MD
1953–1956	Brig. Gen. Edward J. Kendricks MD
1956–1960	Maj. Gen. Otis O. Benson Jr MD
1960–1962	Colonel Robert H. Blount MD
1962–1962	Colonel Paul A. Campbell MD
1962–1966	Colonel Harold V. Ellingson MD
1966–1967	Colonel James B. Nuttall MD
1967–1969	Colonel George E. Schafer MD
1969–1971	Colonel Joseph M. Quashnock MD PhD
1971–1975	Colonel Evan R. Goltra MD
1975–1978	Brig. Gen. Robert G. McIver MD
1978–1980	Colonel Lawrence J. Enders MD
1980–1983	Colonel Roy L. Dehart MD
1983–1985	Colonel Royce Moser Jr MD
1985–1989	Colonel Jeffrey Davis
1989–1990	Colonel George E. Schwender
1990–1993	Colonel Kenneth Hart
1993–1995	Colonel Robert J. Stepp
1995–1999	Colonel Tommy G. Church
1999–2001	Colonel Rodger D. Vanderbeek
2001–2003	Colonel Thomas W. Travis MD
2003–2005	Colonel Courtney D. Scott
2005-2007	Colonel Richard E. Bachmann
2007–2008	Colonel Soledad Lindo-Moon
2008–2011	Colonel Charles E. Fisher Jr
2011–2016	Colonel Christian R. Benjamin
2016-2019	Colonel Alden Hilton
2019-2021	Colonel Tess Goodman
2021-2024	Colonel Tory Woodard
2024-Present	Colonel Richard Speakman

== Names for the School of Aerospace Medicine over the years ==
Time Period	Name
1918–1919	Army Air Service Medical Research Laboratory
1919–1921	The Medical Research Laboratory and School for Flight Surgeons
1921–1961	The School of Aviation Medicine
1961–present	United States Air Force School of Aerospace Medicine
