= Garatéa-L =

Planned Space probe

- Visual representation by the Brazilian Space Agency
- Mission type: Reconnaissance, astrobiology
- Operator: (Brazil) Airvantis
- Website: institutogaratea.com
- Mission duration: 6 months (estimation)

Spacecraft properties
- Bus: CubeSat
- Manufacturer: Airvantis
- Launch mass: 7.2 kg (16 lb)

Moon orbiter

Garatéa-L (Note: From tupi-guarani Garatéa (search [for] life), with "L" meaning Lua (Moon).) is a space probe planned by the Brazilian company Airvantis with the support of institutions such as INPE, IMT, ITA, LNLS/CNPEM, PUC-RS, UFSC, USP and USRA. It will be the first Brazilian mission in deep space, as well as the first directed to the Moon. The CubeSat will be launched by an Indian rocket PSLV as part of the Pathfinder mission, which will pioneer deep space commercial exploration through a partnership between British private companies with the UK Space Agency (UKSA) and the European Space Agency (ESA).

== Mission objectives ==
The Garatéa-L spacecraft aims to investigate extreme living space conditions by conducting tests that will evaluate the effects of cosmic ray exposure on bacterial colonies and on human tissues, contributing to the area of astrobiology and space medicine. Since the spacecraft will be placed in a highly eccentric orbit around the Moon, it is also planned to collect multi-spectral images of the South Pole–Aitken basin on the far side of the Moon. Mission leaders also want to boost Brazilian students' interest in careers related to STEM.

== Preparation and costs ==
The preparations for the mission are both technical and financial. On the technical side, there is the experience in the development of nanosatellites by INPE and ITA. Circuits prepared to avoid radiation problems are worked by IMT, while the payload will be developed by Zenith-USP group of EESC (USP). And in turn, the other institutions (LNLS/CNPEM, IQ-USP, IO-USP, UFSC, Microgravity Centre and USRA-EUA) are responsible for the experiments that will be carried out to conduct astrobiological and medical research on microgravity. The financial part will be made possible through private investments (sponsorship, royalties and eventual patents) and public investments (development agencies). The estimated total cost is R$ 35 million, or about $10.3 million dollars. By 2023, the satellite was under the qualification process by the Brazilian Space Agency. In July 2026, the mission required funding for the Preliminary Design Review, and a form had been submitted to NASA to include the project in the Artemis program.

=== Garatéa-ISS ===
To stimulate the interest of Brazilian students in science and technology, Project Garatéa joined the Student Spaceflight Experiments Program to send student experiments to ISS.

The first experiment, Addition of “Green Plastic” to Enhance Cement Properties in Space, a mix of cement and recyclable plastic to make it more space-enabled by the Dante Alighieri schools, EMEF Perimetral, Projeto Âncora, (São Paulo. Cotia), flew to the station at the SpaceX CRS-15 mission of 2018 during Expedition 56, being the first time Brazilian experiments have been conducted at the station since the Missão Centenário.

The second experiment Capillarity versus Gravity in the Filtration Process made by high school students from the Federal Institute of Santa Catarina, sent in 2019 on the mission SpaceX CRS-18 during the Expedition 60, was an activated carbon filter based on the Brazilian clay filter’s operating method.

The third experiment, by Regina Coeli College (MT), which investigates how the lactose molecule behaves in space, was sent on the SpaceX CRS-21 mission to Expedition 64 in 2020.

== See also ==
- Brazilian space program
- Space medicine
- Thais Russomano, founder of Microgravity Centre
- Astrobiology Research Center (NAP/Astrobio), international partner of NASA Astrobiology Institute
