= John Ernsting =

- Born: 21 April 1928; Woolwich, London
- Died: 2 June 2009 (aged 81)
- Military career
- Allegiance: United Kingdom
- Branch: Royal Air Force
- Service years: 1954–1993
- Rank: Air vice-marshal
- Nickname: JE
- Commands: RAF Institute of Aviation Medicine (1986–92)
- Awards: Companion of the Order of the Bath; Officer of the Order of the British Empire

Air vice-marshal John "JE" Ernsting CB, OBE, FRCP, FRAeS (21 April 1928 – 2 June 2009) was a senior Royal Air Force (RAF) commander and renowned medical researcher.

== Early life ==
Ernsting was born in Woolwich, London on 21 April 1928, and educated at Chislehurst and Sidcup Grammar School for Boys. From Guy's Hospital, he qualified in physiology in 1949 and in medicine in 1952.

== Military career ==
In 1954, Ernsting was commissioned into the RAF Medical Branch, where he spent his entire military service.

While working in the Altitude Division of the RAF Institute of Aviation Medicine, he worked on Partial-pressure suit assemblies. He was head of this division for twenty years from 1957 to 1977. However, the RAF never issued a partial-pressure suit, preferring instead to use anti-g trousers in conjunction with pressure jerkins. He was the aeromedical project officer for the development of the United Kingdom's versions of the Phantom, F-111, and Hercules. He later became chairman of the aeromedical and life support system working parties for the Tornado and Typhoon.

In 1971 he became the RAF Consultant Adviser in Aviation Medicine, a position he held until 1990. Between 1990 and 1993 he served as Dean of Air Force Medicine, then as Senior Consultant (RAF).

Upon leaving the Altitude Division in 1977, he was first appointed Deputy Director of Research (1977–1985), then Director of Research (1985–1988), before becoming Commandant of the RAF Institute of Aviation Medicine (1986–1992). However, between 1979 and 1980, Ernsting spent a sabbatical year at the USAF School of Aerospace Medicine.

He was Queen Elizabeth II's honorary surgeon from 1989 to 1993.

He retired as commandant of the IAM in December 1992 and from the RAF on 21 April 1993.

== Later life and death ==
On retiring from the RAF, Ernsting became a visiting professor at King's College London (KCL), where he taught a human and applied physiology Master of Science course. Later, KCL asked him to establish a research laboratory. He was active both in research and in training undergraduate and postgraduate students for 16 years. In addition to his position at KCL, he was a visiting professor at Imperial College, London. In 1998, Ernsting was appointed Head of the Human Physiology and Aerospace Medicine Group of the Guy's, King's and St Thomas's School of Biomedical Sciences.

He was the Honorary Civil Consultant in Aviation Medicine to the Royal Air Force. He was also an aeromedical adviser to BAE Systems, and a Fellow of the Aerospace Medical Association. Ernsting was an international ambassador for aviation medicine. He was President of the International Academy of Aviation and Space Medicine from 1995 to 1997.

== Awards ==
On 1 January 1958, the then Acting Squadron Leader Ernsting, was appointed an Officer of the Order of the British Empire for his work in connection with the Lightning and Canberra aircraft.

He was appointed Companion of the Order of the Bath on 31 December 1991, on completion of his tenure as Commandant of the RAF Institute of Aviation.

Ernsting received the Louis H. Bauer Award from the Aerospace Medical Association in 2002.

In May 2008 Ernsting was awarded the title of honoris causa by PUCRS, Porto Alegre, Brazil in recognition of his distinguished contribution to the field of Aerospace Physiology. He was further honoured with the dedication of a research laboratory in his name, the John Ernsting Aerospace Physiology Laboratory, at the Microgravity Centre, PUCRS.

== Personal life ==
He was married twice. He had two sons (one of whom predeceased him) and a daughter through his first marriage. He was survived by his second wife Joyce, née Heppell, whom he married in 1970.
