= Thais (given name) =

- Gender: Female
- Language: Greek, Spanish, Portuguese

Origin
- Origin: Ancient Greece

Other names
- Variant forms: Thaïs, Thaís, Taís, Tays, Taisia

Thais, Thaïs, Thaís or Taís is a given name of Greek origin.

== Thais ==
- Thais Blatnik (1919–2015), American journalist and politician
- Thais Lawton (1879–1956), American actress
- Thais St. Julien (1945–2019), American soprano
- Thais Russomano (born 1963), Brazilian doctor and researcher
- Thais Souza Wiggers (born 1985), Brazilian-Italian television presenter and model
- Thais Weiller, Brazilian game designer and producer

== Thaïs ==
- Thaïs, a celebrated hetaira during the era of Alexander (356-323 BCE)
- Thaïs (saint), 4th century repentant courtesan and saint of Roman Egypt
- Thaïs Blume (born 1984), Spanish actress
- Thaïs Henríquez (born 1982), Spanish synchronized swimmer

== Thaís ==
- Thaís Helena da Silva (born 1987), Brazilian footballer
- Thaís Cristina da Silva Ferreira (born 1996), Brazilian footballer
- Thaís Guedes (also known as Thaisinha, born 1993), Brazilian footballer
- Thaís Picarte (born 1982), Brazilian football goalkeeper
- Thaís Fidélis (born 2001), Brazilian artistic gymnast
- Thaís de Campos (born 1956), Brazilian actress
- Thaís Melchior (born 1990), Brazilian actress
- Thaís Pacholek (born 1983), Brazilian actress
- Thaís Regina (born 1999), Brazilian footballer

== Taís ==
- Taís Araújo (born 1978), Brazilian actress and model
- Taís Rochel (born 1983), Brazilian fencer
