= Aerospace Medicine and Human Performance =

- Discipline: Aviation and aerospace medicine
- Language: English
- Edited by: David G. Newman

Publication details
- History: Journal of Aviation Medicine (1930–1958); Aerospace Medicine (1959–1974); Aviation, Space, and Environmental Medicine (1975–2014); Aerospace Medicine and Human Performance (2015–present)
- Publisher: Aerospace Medical Association (United States)
- Frequency: Monthly

Standard abbreviations
- ISO 4: Aerosp. Med. Hum. Perform.

Indexing
- Aerospace Medicine and Human Performance
- ISSN: 2375-6314 (print); 2375-6322 (web)
- OCLC no.: 893609346
- Aviation, Space, and Environmental Medicine
- CODEN: ASEMCG
- ISSN: 0095-6562
- LCCN: 75641492
- OCLC no.: 165744230
- Aerospace Medicine
- ISSN: 0001-9402
- Journal of Aviation Medicine
- ISSN: 0095-991X

Links
- Journal homepage

Aerospace Medicine and Human Performance (AMHP) is a peer-reviewed scientific journal in the field of aviation and aerospace medicine. It was founded as the Journal of Aviation Medicine in 1930 by Louis H. Bauer, M.D., and is published monthly by the Aerospace Medical Association.

Aerospace Medicine and Human Performance is the most used and cited journal in its field, and is distributed to more than 80 nations.

The journal was first published, under the title Journal of Aviation Medicine in 1930. In 1959 the title changed to Aerospace Medicine, was renamed Aviation, Space, and Environmental Medicine in 1975, and acquired its current name in 2015. It is often referred to as "the blue journal" by its subscribers.

Digital content from recent (since 2003) journal issues is available online via IngentaConnect. This content is free-of-charge to AsMA members and available for purchase to non-members. A DVD archive is available for purchase from AsMA. This DVD contains all articles published before 2003, including the predecessor titles back to 1930.

== See also ==
- List of medical journals
