= Thais Russomano =

Brazilian medical researcher (born 1963)

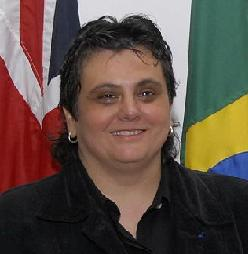
- Born: 25 September 1963; Porto Alegre Rio Grande do Sul
- Died: October 18, 2026 (aged 63); Porto Alegre
- Education: King's College London; Wright State University, Dayton, Ohio; Federal University of Pelotas, Brazil
- Known for: Lecturer, researcher, scientific consultant, course organiser, writer
- Scientific career
- Fields: Space medicine, Aerospace medicine, Aerospace Biomedical Engineering, Telemedicine, Telehealth
- Workplaces: King's College London
- Doctoral advisor: John Ernsting

Thais Russomano (born 25 September 1963) was a Brazilian doctor and scientific researcher specialising in space medicine, space physiology, biomedical engineering, telemedicine and telehealth. She founded the Microgravity Centre (MicroG) at PUCRS university, Porto Alegre, Brazil, in 1999, coordinating it for 18 years until 2017. The MicroG is the first educational and research centre in Space Life Sciences in Latin America. She was a senior lecturer at King's College London, lecturing in Aviation and Space related courses; coordinator of the Space Network (Rede Espaço), University of Lisbon; guest lecturer at Aalto University, Finland in Space and Design; guest lecturer at Deggendorf Institute of Technology, European Campus Rottal-Inn, contributing to the MSc in Medical Informatics; consultant for the Skolkovo Foundation; member of the Mars One Advisory Board; International Relations Director for the UK-based HuSCO, Human Spaceflight Capitalization Office; and director of two private companies linked to space life sciences and telehealth – InnovaSpace Consultancy (UK) and International Space Medicine Consortium (USA).

== Early life ==
Russomano grew up in the city of Pelotas in southern Brazil and studied medicine at the Federal University of Pelotas, qualifying in 1985. Fours years on an Internal Medicine Residency program followed at Hospital de Clinicas, Porto Alegre, Brazil.

== Academic career ==
Russomano pursued a career in Aerospace medicine outside of her home country of Brazil, due to a lack of such courses nationally. In 1991 she completed an MSc in Aerospace Medicine at Wright State University, Ohio, USA. The following year, 1992, Russomano completed a NASA Flight Surgeon training course at the Lyndon B. Johnson Space Center, Houston, Texas, USA.
The years 1994 through till 1998 were spent at King's College London, UK where she became the first person to complete a Ph.D. in respiratory space physiology under the mentorship of Air Vice-Marshall John Ernsting CB OBE FRCP FFOM FRAeS. Subsequent to this, Russomano spent time working at the German Aerospace Centre, Cologne, Germany before returning to Brazil and establishing the Microgravity Centre in 1999. A further period of Post-Doctoral research in Space Life Science was completed at King's College in 2007. Russomano's links remained with King's College London, acting as a visiting professor for a number of years, before being formally employed as a senior lecturer, based in the Centre for Human and Applied Physiological Sciences (CHAPS), School of Basic & Medical Biosciences, Faculty of Life Sciences & Medicine, King's College London, contributing to Aviation and Space related Courses. In addition, more recently Russomano has become linked with the University of Lisbon, School of Medicine, where she is a coordinator of the Space Network (Rede Espaço), Aalto University School of Arts, Design and Architecture, Finland where she conducts workshops in Space & Design; Deggendorf Institute of Technology, European Campus Rottal-Inn, contributing to an MSc in Medical Informatics; and the Federal University of Health Sciences of Porto Alegre where she is an invited member of a Space Physiology and Extreme Environments research groups. Russomano is an elected academician of the International Academy of Aviation and Space Medicine (IAASM), the International Academy of Astronautics (IAA) and the Iberoamerican Aerospace Medical Association (IAMA).

== Achievements ==
The Microgravity Centre, founded by Russomano and coordinated until 2017, has become an internationally recognised research centre in Space Life Sciences and led the way in Latin America. Research and teaching cooperations were formed with many national and international partners including King's College London, UK; Institute of Aerospace Medicine, German Aerospace Centre, Cologne Germany; Greek Aerospace Medical Association, Thessalonik Greece; Medical University of Warsaw, Poland; Kaunas University of Medicine Lithuania; New York University, USA; and the Brazilian Society of Aerospace Medicine.

== Selected bibliography ==
=== Books ===
- RUSSOMANO T, JOÃO DE CARVALHO CASTRO. Fisiologia Aerospacial, EdiPUCRS, 2012
- RUSSOMANO T. Traição, EdiPucrs & AGE Editora, 2010
- VERNIKOS J, RUSSOMANO T. A Gravidade - Esta Grande Escultora, EdiPucrs, 2009
- RUSSOMANO T, FALCAO FP, DALMARCO G. The Effects of Hypergravity and Microgravity on Biomedical Experiments, Morgan & Claypool, 2008
