= RAF Institute of Aviation Medicine =

- Active: 1945 - 1994
- Country: United Kingdom
- Branch: Royal Air Force
- Role: Aviation Medicine

The Royal Air Force Institute of Aviation Medicine (IAM) was a Royal Air Force aviation medicine research unit active between 1945 and 1994.

== History ==
The RAF Institute of Aviation Medicine (IAM) was a peacetime successor to the RAF Physiological Laboratory, which had relocated to Farnborough Airfield in Hampshire and effectively aligned with the Royal Aircraft Establishment (RAE) prior to the Second World War. This organisation had long studied the effects of aviation environment on personnel and undertook the development of equipment and procedures to protect against various ill effects.

On 30 April 1945, the IAM was officially opened by the Princess Royal. It was located on land to the south side of Farnborough Airfield and initially organised into separate sections for acceleration, altitude, biochemistry, biophysics, personal equipment and teaching. IAM's mandate was to conduct both theoretical and applied research in support of flying personnel. The majority of its personnel were either serving officers of the RAF or civil servants drawn from the Air Ministry. The IAM's research activities were overseen by the Flying Personnel Research Committee (FPRC). Upon its founding, it was run by Dr Bryan Matthews, while Group Captain Bill Stewart was appointed as head of IAM in 1946.

In the years following the end of the Second World War, IAM personnel sought to obtain and evaluate progress made in aviation medicine in Nazi Germany. During its fact-finding mission, it became apparent that some of this research was obtained from involuntary experimentation on victims held in concentration camps. During 1948, the IAM decided to exclude medical data obtained from Nazi aviation experiments on both moral and scientific grounds.

One prominent early undertaking of IAM was its involvement in the development and deployment of the ejector seat. On 12 November 1946, the IAM recommended that both Martin-Baker and R Malcolm Ltd should progress from experimental work towards production for wider industry. Work at the IAM on ejectors seats continued throughout the Cold War era, both to develop greater understanding and to make improvements.

In the 1960s and 1970s, the IAM became a world leading centre for aviation medicine research, gaining additional facilities, and continuing an active flight research programme that commenced in the Second World War. Research into protection against the effects of high altitude, high G force, heat and cold stress, noise and vibration, sleep and wakefulness, spatial disorientation, vision, aviation psychology and human error, and aircraft accident investigation dominated activities at the IAM. It was involved in multiple improvements in the field of life support equipment for aircrew. The IAM was also heavily involved in the provision of various postgraduate-level courses on aerospace medicine for both civil and military students.

The IAM ceased to exist in 1994 amid sweeping reorganisations of military research organisations in the UK. While DERA, and subsequently QinetiQ, took over operation of numerous facilities along with the majority of the research staff, remaining elements were allocated to the newly-formed RAF Centre of Aviation Medicine, which opened in 1998 at RAF Henlow in Bedfordshire, and conducts training and operational support for RAF aircrew.

== Facilities ==
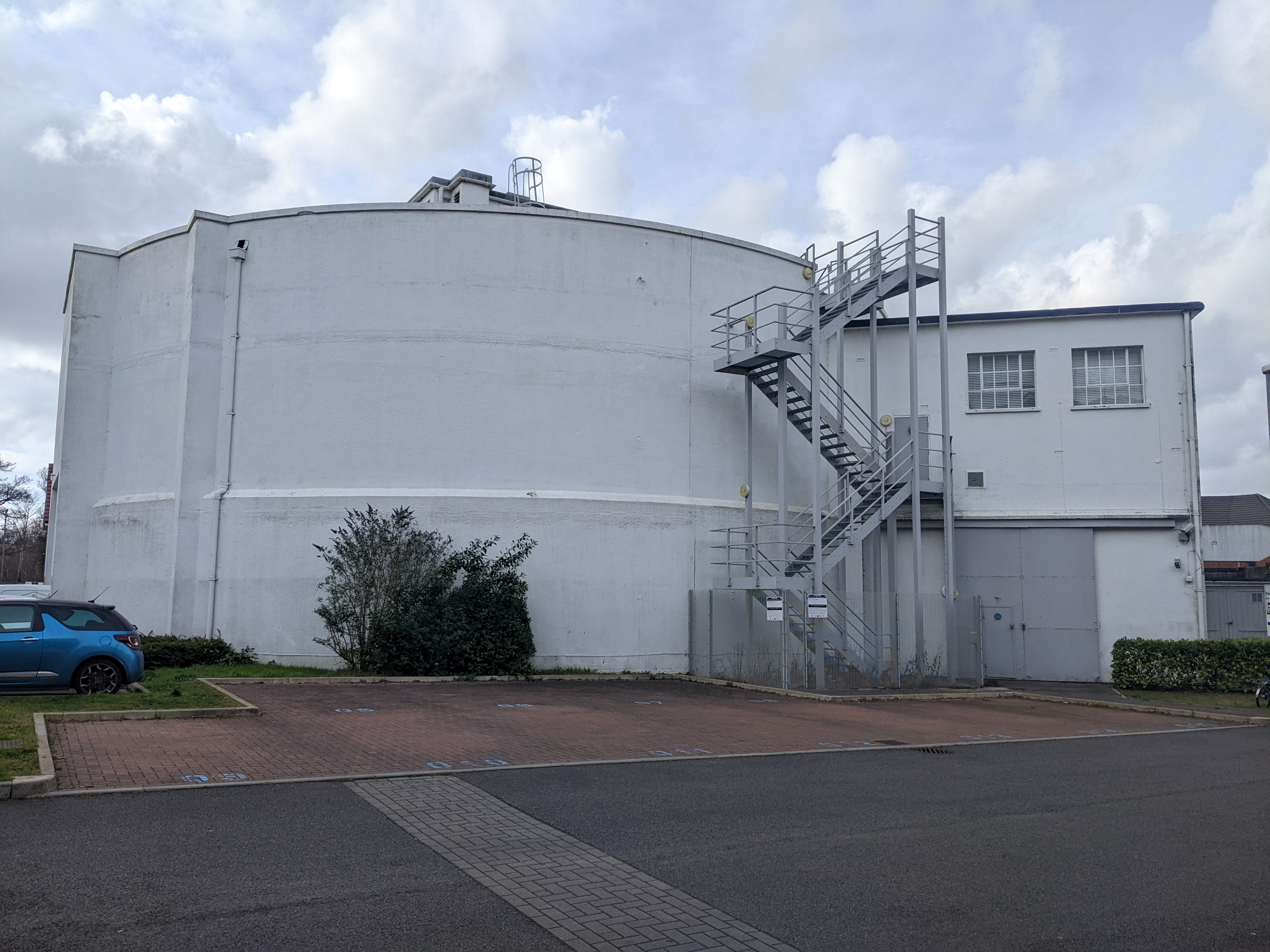
Exterior of the Grade II* listed centrifuge building

The IAM obtained a decompression chamber (moved from the Physiological Laboratory) in 1945, and this was supplemented by a climatic chamber in 1952, and a human centrifuge in 1955. The latter facility was in operation until March 2019, and was used by Helen Sharman in her training to become a cosmonaut. Its replacement for training is at RAF Cranwell. The Farnborough centrifuge was designated a Grade II listed building in August 2007, and upgraded to Grade II* in April 2026.

Additionally, the IAM was responsible for a number of mobile decompression chambers, along with the training of operators for such chambers; these were typically deployed across several different RAF operational stations for the purpose of familiarising flying personnel with the effects of anoxia at operational altitudes.

== Aircraft ==
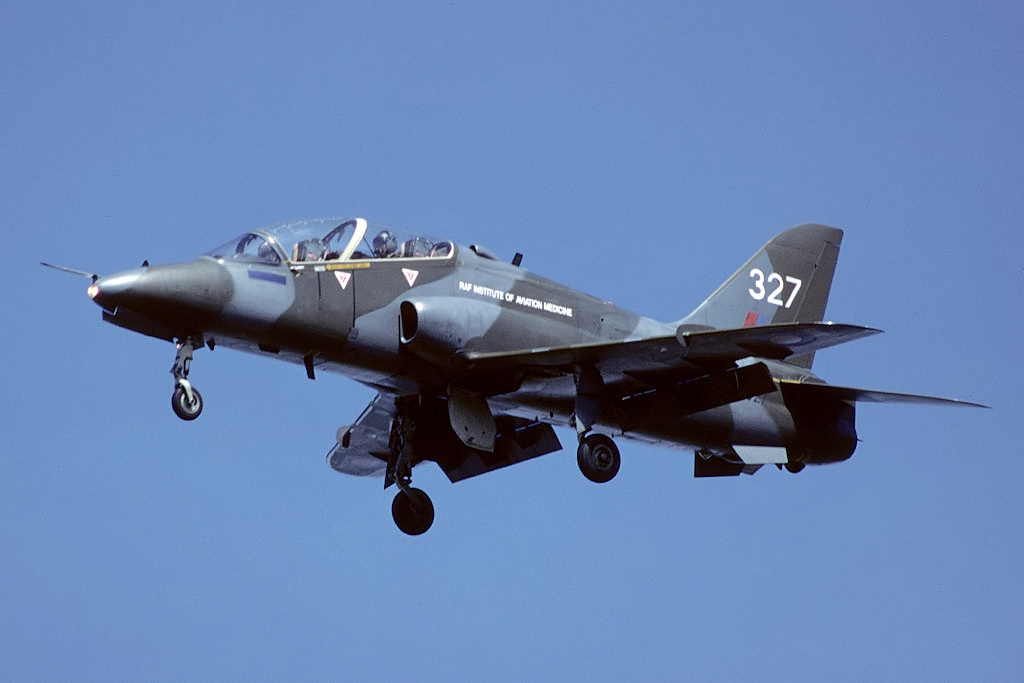
BAe Hawk of the RAF Institute of Aviation Medicine, March 1994

The IAM operated numerous aircraft for experimental purposes. These included:

- Supermarine Spitfire
- Percival Provost
- Gloster Meteor
- English Electric Canberra
- Hawker Hunter
- British Aerospace Hawk

== Commanding Officers ==
- 1945-1946 - Sir Bryan Matthews
- 1946-1967 - AVM William K Stewart
- 1967-1974 - AVM Henry L Roxburgh
- 1975-1988 - AVM Peter Howard
- 1988-1992 - AVM John Ernsting
