= Peter Howard (RAF officer) =

- Born: 15 December 1925; Aldershot, England
- Died: 21 October 2007 (aged 81)
- Military career
- Allegiance: United Kingdom
- Branch: Royal Air Force
- Rank: Air vice-marshal
- Commands: RAF Institute of Aviation Medicine (1975–88)
- Awards: Companion of the Order of the Bath; Officer of the Order of the British Empire

Air Vice Marshal Peter Howard, CB, OBE, FRCP, FRAeS (15 December 1925 – 21 October 2007) was a senior aviation medicine doctor with the Royal Air Force. Howard was a Fellow of the Royal College of Physicians and of the Royal Aeronautical Society.

== Early life ==
Howard was born in Aldershot and was educated at the Farnborough Grammar School. He later studied medicine at St Thomas' Hospital Medical School before joining the Royal Air Force medical branch.

== Career ==
His RAF career began as a consultant in aviation medicine, followed by his appointment as commandant of the RAF Institute of Aviation Medicine in 1975, a post he held until 1988. Other appointments included; Dean of Air Force Medicine from 1985 to 1987, The Queen's Honorary Physician from 1982 to 1988 and that of Royal Air Force's Senior Consultant from 1987 to 1988. Howard gained some notoriety in 1962, as the first man to test the world's first rocket-powered ejector seat, developed by the Martin-Baker company. The rocket-powered ejector seat had distinct advantages over the original explosive cartridge seats in that it subjected the ejecting airmen to much lower G forces, thus reducing the risk of injuries.

Howard's last major project prior to his retirement was his involvement in the selection of Britain's first two astronauts, Helen Sharman and Tim Mace.

== Awards ==
Howard was appointed an Officer of the Order of the British Empire in 1957 followed by a Companion of the Order of the Bath in 1989. He was also awarded the James Martin Medal, from the Guild of Aviation Pilots and Navigators in 1988. The award commemorated the 1,000 pilots' lives saved by the rocket-powered ejection seat that he helped to perfect.
