= Julian Elvis Ward Jr. =

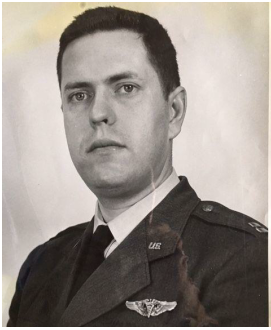
Julian E. Ward, Jr. M.D.

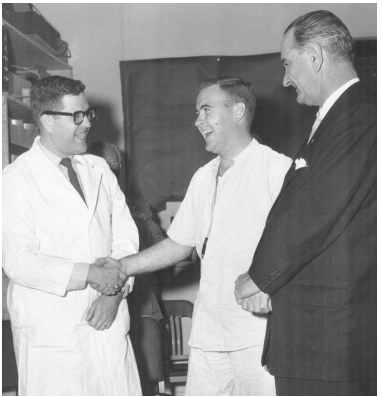
Airman 1st Class Donald Farrell is greeted by Capt. (Dr.) Julian Ward and then-Senate Majority Leader Lyndon Baines Johnson after spending seven days in a cramped chamber at Randolph AFB in 1958

Captain (Dr.) Julian Ward, MD (March 15, 1927 - August 13, 1962 ) was an American physician who made contributions to aerospace medicine and the Mercury space program.

== Biography ==
On March 15, 1927, Julian Elvis Ward Jr. was born in Wichita Falls, Texas. In 1952, he received M.D., M.S. (pathology, cum laude) degrees from Baylor College of Medicine. He completed an internship at San Francisco City-County Hospital.

In 1953 Ward entered US Air Force as First Lieutenant. He helped develop a partial pressure suit (prototype space suit) at Gunter AFB, near Montgomery, Alabama, while serving as Chief of the Flight Surgeon Section, School of Aviation Medicine, Gunter Branch. In 1955, he received a Master of Public Health (M.P.H.) degree from Harvard University School of Public Health, M.P.H. (cum laude). In 1958 Ward was named Deputy Chief, School of Space Medicine, Randolph Air Force Base, San Antonio, Texas. From 1959 to 1962, Major Ward was Commander of the 49th Tactical Hospital at Spangdahlen AFB, Germany. During this assignment, he monitored the safety of crewed space flights, including that of John Glenn’s 1962 Friendship 7 flight, from a telemetry station in the Canary Islands.

== Contribution to Mercury space program ==
In a 1958 North Carolina newspaper article, "Medical Men Say Space Flight Might Be Safer Than Columbus", Ward described weightlessness as the biggest mystery in space medicine. Ward's involvement in the space program should be seen in the context of the Cold War in which the United States was engaged following WWII and President Kennedy's dramatic proposal of US commitment to the goal of landing a man on the Moon before the end of the 1960s.

Ward explored the unknown as a scientist and pioneer, initially using Earth-bound isolation chambers and short flights into the upper atmosphere how humans could travel safely in space, ensuring those who might attempt a space voyage that they would be protected from its dangers. Besides the Earth-bound experiments with humans, he monitored the health of animals (mice and chimpanzees) in suborbital and orbital flights. He tracked the first Earth sub-orbital and orbital crewed space missions in Project Mercury from Tenerife in the Canary Islands, including the first US orbital space mission of John Glenn in February 1962. Ward explored the possibility of human life in a condition of weightlessness, human life beyond the limitations and restrictions of Earth.

Ward authored thirteen professional papers and co-author two others on a diversity of topics. One publication that achieved widespread attention was "The True Nature of the Boiling of Body Fluids in Space", a paper presented at a symposium on Medical Problems of Space Flight at the US Air Force School of Aviation Medicine, January 19–20, 1956. The paper was published in Aviation Medicine in October 1956. It introduced the term "space ebullism" for the vaporization of body fluids in space at body temperatures.

== Death ==
On August 13, 1962, Ward died at age 35 as a result of injuries from a plane crash in Germany.

== Julian E. Ward Memorial Award ==
The Julian E. Ward Memorial Award was established and sponsored by the Society of US Air Force Flight Surgeons in memory of its first member to lose their life in an aircraft accident, and to honor all flight surgeons whose lives are lost in the pursuit of flying activities related to the practice of aerospace medicine. The award is given annually for superior performance and/or outstanding achievement in the art and science of aerospace medicine during residency training.
