= Theodore C. Lyster =

United States Army chief surgeon and researcher (1875–1933)

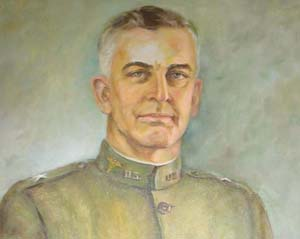
- Brig. Gen. Theodore C. Lyster, M.D.
- Born: July 10, 1875; Fort Larned, Kansas, U.S.
- Died: August 5, 1933 (aged 58); Los Angeles, California, U.S.
- Burial place: Arlington National Cemetery
- Alma mater: University of Michigan
- Military career
- Rank: Brigadier General

Brigadier General Theodore C. Lyster, M.D. (10 July 1875 – 5 August 1933) was a United States Army physician and aviation medicine pioneer.

In 1918, Lyster established an army laboratory that put aviation medicine on a sound scientific basis in the United States and he insisted on making military aviation physicians organic members of the flying squadrons, thus creating the position and role of "flight surgeon". These efforts, along with his 1917 creation of the post of chief surgeon, Aviation Section, Signal Corps and his planning and directing of the United States Army Air Medical Service, earned him the title of "Father of Aviation Medicine" or " Father of Army Aviation Medicine".

== Early life and education ==
Theodore Charles Lyster was born at Fort Larned, Kansas, the son of U.S. Army Captain William J. and Martha Doughty Lyster. His childhood was spent in various posts around the country. At the age of seven, Lyster contracted yellow fever while living in Fort Brown, Texas. He was treated by William Gorgas, and Gorgas was credited with his recovery. Later, Gorgas married Lyster's aunt, making Lyster Gorgas's nephew by marriage. Having recovered from yellow fever, Lyster had a lifelong immunity to it.

He received his Ph.B. in 1897 and his in M.D. in 1899, both from the University of Michigan. In June 1898, Lyster entered the army as a private and hospital steward.

== Military career ==
On October 3, 1900, he was commissioned as a surgeon. Lyster subsequently served as the Chief of the Eye, Ear, Nose, and Throat Clinic at Ancon (Canal Zone) Hospital, Panama and Chief of the Eye Service in the University of Philippines, Manila. In 1914, during the American occupation of Vera Cruz, Mexico, Lyster served there as Chief Health Officer.

=== World War I ===
A month after the United States entered World War I, Lyster was promoted to lieutenant colonel. It was by War Department Special Order 207 (September 6, 1917) that Lyster became the first chief surgeon, Aviation Section, Signal Corps, United States Army—a position he had recommended as essential to fully realize the capability of Army aviation and provide adequate medical support to it. He was also Chief of Aviation and Professional Services in The Surgeon General's Office in 1917 and 1918, for which he was awarded the Distinguished Service Award. With the expansion of the army and his new duties as chief surgeon, he rose to brigadier general in March 1918.

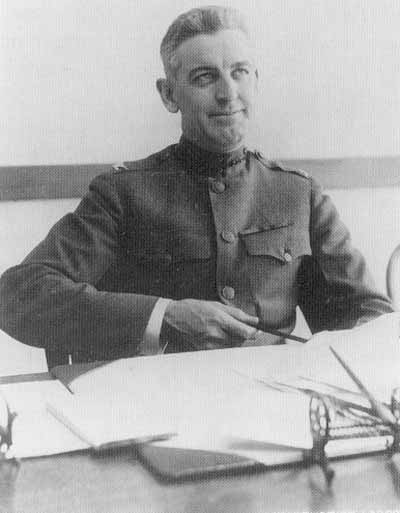
Lyster as a colonel, 1917.

Following a visit to Europe in 1918, Lyster conducted numerous research studies on the "Care of the Flyer" which led to substantial improvements in treatment and recovery. Learning from the British experience during the first years of World War I, Lyster made two important contributions to the efficiency and safety of flying. First, he emphasized physical standards for pilots. The British had cut flying fatalities from 60% to 20% by screening pilots for medical defects. This emphasis led Lyster to champion an extensive research program. This program was under the control of a board "with discretionary powers to investigate all conditions affecting the physical efficiency of pilots, to carry out experiments and tests at different flying schools, to provide suitable apparatus for the supply of oxygen ... [and] to act as a standing organization for instruction in the physiological requirements of aviators." This board established the first laboratory of its kind and put aviation medicine on a sound scientific basis in the United States. Lyster's second major contribution was to insist on making aviation surgeons be organic parts of the squadrons. This arrangement meant that surgeons familiar with aviation would deploy with the flying units, rather than being part of a larger medical organization that would be slower to respond. This organization, as well as the emphasis Lyster put on selection and training of aviation surgeons, produced the concept of the flight surgeon.

Although Lyster's most significant contribution was pioneering aviation medicine, he was instrumental in many other areas. He was primarily responsible for standardizing and expediting physical examinations (1917) and in organizing the Medical Research Board (1918). He was a member of several civilian medical organizations and made many valuable contributions to medical literature. His studies of yellow fever and his work in otorhinolaryngology are of lasting relevance.

== In retirement ==
Lyster retired from active duty on 28 February 1919, reverting to his permanent rank of colonel.

After the death of Dr Gorgas, Lyster carried on his work with the Rockefeller Foundation (1920–24) of eliminating yellow fever from Mexico and Central America. He served as medical examiner of the U.S. Department of Commerce, organizing the first issuing of licenses to commercial aviators. He also served as president of the Southern California Medical Association.

By an Act of Congress in June, 1930, Lyster was promoted (restored) to "Brigadier General, Retired".

== Death ==
He died in Los Angeles, California on August 5, 1933, aged 58, of coronary sclerosis and angina pectoris.

== Legacy ==
- The Theodore C. Lyster Award is given annually by the Aerospace Medical Association (AsMA) for outstanding achievement in the general field of aerospace medicine.
- Lyster Army Health Clinic, U.S. Army Aeromedical Center, Fort Rucker, Alabama, established in 1967, was named in honor of Lyster.
