= 1% rule (aviation medicine) =

Risk threshold applied to the medical fitness of pilots

In aviation medicine, the 1% rule is a risk threshold that is applied to the medical fitness of pilots. The 1% rule states that a 1% per annum risk (See also risk management) of medical incapacitation is the threshold between acceptable and unacceptable. In other words:

Applying this 1 percent rule would result in an airline pilot being denied a medical certificate if their risk of a medical incapacitation (e.g. heart attack, convulsion, stroke, faint etc) was determined as being greater than 1% during the year.

This 1 percent rule began in the late 1980s and early 1990s in a series of British and then European aviation cardiology workshops. The application of this "1 percent rule" has subsequently spread beyond the domain of aviation cardiology to all potential causes of medical incapacitation.

The reasoning that was used in the development of the original aviation medical 1 percent rule is well described in Flight Safety and Medical Incapacitation Risk of Airline Pilots (see references). In this article the authors argue that changes in the underlying assumptions, that were the basis of the 1 percent rule, have been such that a 2 percent rule may be an appropriate modern analogue.

The application of this one percent rule is controversial. The civil aviation regulatory authorities of some nations employ such numerical risk thresholds while others do not. Of those that use numerical risk criteria there are differences in the levels of measured / calculated risk that are applied (1% per annum, 2% per annum etc.). There is also debate concerning the application of population statistics to an individual pilot and the utility and validity of the risk screening tools that are used by the civil aviation regulatory authorities (e.g. data from the Framingham Heart Study).
