= 711th Human Performance Wing =

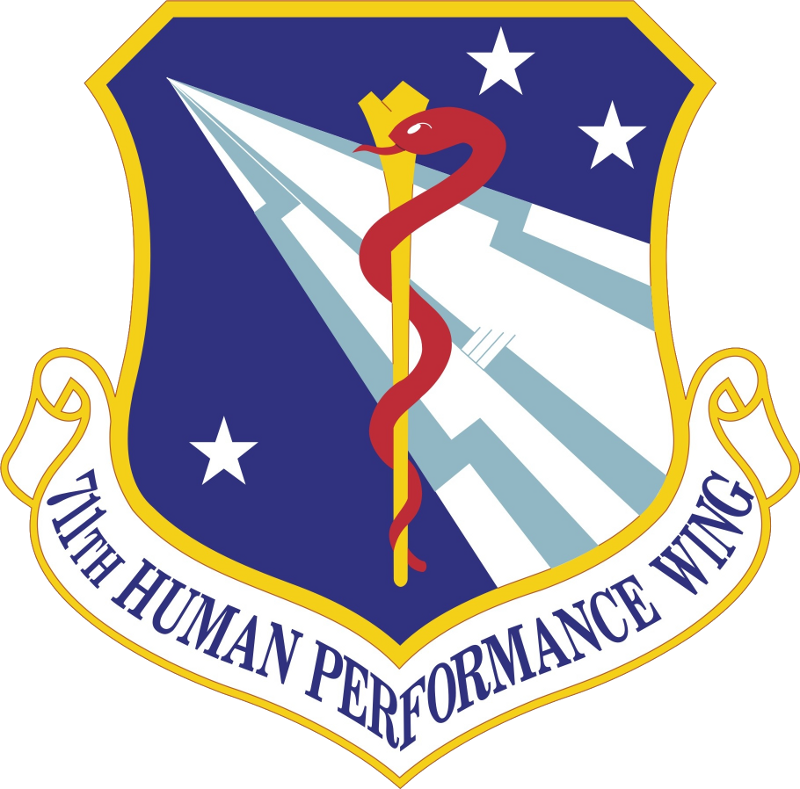
- Active: March 2008 — present
- Country: United States
- Branch: Air Force
- Type: Human
- Size: 2000
- Part of: Air Force Materiel Command
- Garrison/HQ: Wright-Patterson AFB

Commanders
- Commander: Brigadier General Dale Harrell

The 711th Human Performance Wing (711 HPW) is a wing of the United States Air Force based at Wright-Patterson Air Force Base near Dayton, Ohio.

Air Force officials redesignated the inactive Harry G. Armstrong Aerospace Medical Research Laboratory, or AAMRL, as the 711th HPW and activated it on March 26, 2008, as one of 10 entities moving under the control of the Air Force Research Laboratory. The AF Aerospace Medical Research Laboratory (AAMRL) was constituted on 20 Aug 1979, and activated 8 Sept 1979. The AAMRL was the predecessor organization of the RHC & RHP Divisions as they existed in 2008. The Laboratory was redesignated the Harry G. Armstrong Aerospace Medical Research Laboratory 1 Jan 1985, and inactivated on 13 December 1990.

== Mission ==
The mission of the 711 HPW is to advance human performance in air, space, and cyberspace through research, education, and consultation. The Wing supports the most critical Air Force resource - the operational military forces. The Wing's primary focus areas are aerospace medicine, human effectiveness, science and technology, and human systems integration. In conjunction with the Naval Medical Research Unit Dayton and surrounding universities and medical institutions, the 711 HPW functions as a Joint Department of Defense (DoD) Center of Excellence for human performance operating in a university model of education and training, research, and consultation. The 711 HPW was activated in March 2008 in response to the 2005 Base Realignment and Closure (BRAC) directives.

== Units ==
The 711 HPW is located at Wright-Patterson Air Force Base, Ohio and consists of three Mission Units:

- Airman Systems Directorate
- United States Air Force School of Aerospace Medicine (USAFSAM)
- Human Systems Integration Directorate

== Primary Mission Areas ==
To achieve its mission of advancing human performance in air, space, and cyberspace through research, education, and consultation, the 711 HPW has four Primary Mission Areas (PMAs):

Airman Health and Performance

The convergence of science, medicine, and engineering to enhance, optimize, and sustain the physical, psychological, cognitive, and behavioral states across the Airman’s lifecycle to achieve airpower dominance.

Airman-Machine Teaming

Airmen and machines working together to accomplish the mission with greater effectiveness and efficiency than either entity can achieve on its own.

Force Protection

Mitigation of harmful and stressing mission environments, while sustaining the performance and ensuring the safety of Airmen through research, consultation, and integration advancements.

Education and Training

Prepare diverse learners in a stimulating academic environment to perform the mission anytime, anywhere, and in the most demanding circumstances. Apply and extend learning and assessment science, technologies and applications coupled with policy, and operational experience, to create research-driven, agile and relevant curricula for persistent readiness and lifelong learning.

These PMAs cut across the 711 HPW’s organizational lines and are aligned with USAF and DoD strategic direction.

== Bases stationed ==
- Wright-Patterson Air Force Base, Ohio
- JBSA Fort Sam Houston, Texas
