= Louis H. Bauer =

Louis Hopewell Bauer
- Born: July 18, 1888; Boston, Massachusetts
- Died: February 2, 1964 (aged 75); Rockville Centre, New York
- Other name: Louis H. Bauer
- Education: Harvard Medical School (MD)

Louis Hopewell Bauer (July 18, 1888 – February 2, 1964) was an American medical doctor who founded the Aerospace Medical Association in 1929. Bauer was the first medical director of the Aeronautics Branch of the Department of Commerce which became the Federal Aviation Administration (FAA).

== Career ==
He was Commandant of the School of Aviation Medicine between 1919 and 1925. During 1926, he established a medical section in the Bureau of Air Commerce, Department of Commerce. On October 7, 1929, the Aero Medical Association of the United States was founded by Bauer.

He also founded the Journal of Aviation Medicine, the predecessor of the present Aviation, Space, and Environmental Medicine journal. The first issue of this Journal was published in March, 1930. Bauer was the Journal's editor for 25 years.

Bauer was President and Chairman of the American Medical Association and leader of the World Medical Association.

== Personal life ==
He was married to Helena Meredith Bauer who was a social worker with the Massachusetts General Hospital. Together they had a son, Charles Theodore Bauer, who was born on March 3, 1919. He was Co-Founder and the Chairman of AIM Management Group.

== Louis Bauer Award ==
The Louis Bauer Award is awarded by the Aerospace Medical Association. It is given in honour of Bauer, who was the founder of the AMA. It is awarded annually "for the most significant contribution in aerospace medicine".
