= Microgravity Centre =

Microgravity Centre, PUCRS

The Microgravity Centre (Centro de Microgravidade), colloquially known as the "MicroG", at PUCRS university, Porto Alegre, Brazil, was initially created as a laboratory in 1999 by Thais Russomano, as the first academic and research establishment dedicated to Space Life Sciences in Latin America. It evolved into a fully multidisciplinary centre in 2006, expanding its areas of research beyond aerospace medicine and engineering, to include pharmaceuticals, biomechanics and physiotherapy, among others.

The MicroG is now an internationally recognised and leading research centre in diverse fields of knowledge, producing numerous relevant studies. Russomano remained as Coordinator of the research centre until July 2017.

== Structure ==
The centre is a multi-disciplinary unit that brings together researchers, professors and students from many different faculties within PUCRS, including medicine, engineering, aeronautical sciences, pharmacy, biosciences, physics, informatics, sports science, odontology, physiotherapy, nursing and nutrition.

The centre comprises eight research laboratories:

- John Ernsting Aerospace Physiology Lab
- Joan Vernikos Aerospace Pharmacy Lab
- Aerospace Engineering Lab
- Aerospace Biomechanics Lab
- Aerospace Physiotherapy Lab
- Aviation Research Lab
- eHealth Lab
- Imaging Lab

== Projects ==
Each laboratory conceives and develops its own research projects in each field of interest. While most of the studies are coordinated and executed by biomedical researchers, the experimental equipment development and assembly falls to the Aerospace Engineering Lab, located within the School of Engineering. Commonplace activities include training Aeronautical Sciences students in aviation medicine, studies to understand how the human body reacts and works in Low-G or Zero-G environments, and engineering and construction of devices and tools to study and improve human activity in space. Some examples of the work of the MicroG include; lower body negative pressure (LBNP) box; lower body positive pressure (LBPP) box; Bárány chair; body suspension device for microgravity and hypogravity simulations; tilt-table for microgravity simulation; small centrifuge to study the effects of hypergravity on plants; small hypobaric chamber; portable dark chambers; pressure measurement system for use during the Valsalva Manoeuvre and the Earlobe Arterial Blood Collector (EABC).

Studies have been conducted in space life sciences, including researches related to:

- The effects of microgravity, hypogravity and hypergravity simulations on human physiology
- Analysis of plant germination and growth during hypergravity exposures
- Evaluation of new cardiopulmonary resuscitation techniques in aerospace environments (Evetts-Russomano method)
- Study of spatial disorientation and space motion sickness
- Physiological responses to exposure to lower body negative pressure protocols
- The effects of pressure changes on medication (in-flight medicines)
- Evaluation of medication, enzymes and plants during microgravity simulation inside a 3D clinostat
- Human factors in aviation
- Psychological performance during microgravity simulation
- Effects of medication on physical and mental performance during physiological studies using ground-based simulations
- Evaluation of the human walk pattern in reduced gravitational force simulations
- Establishment of Telemedicine and eHealth projects in telesurgery, teledermatology, telecardiology, teleeducation, teleodontology, teleradiology and telepathology
- Telemedicine and assistance to remote Indian communities, including Amazon missions in 2007 & 2008

== Publications ==
Professors, researchers, and students of the Microgravity Centre have produced over 200 academic papers, published in many leading field-specific journals, chapters in books, and full books.

== National & international partnerships ==
The MicroG has collaborated with several national and international partners around the world, exchanging research, teaching, students and professors. Current and former partners include:

- Brazilian Space Agency
- Brazilian Society of Aerospace Medicine
- King's College London, UK
- Kingston University, London, UK
- Johnson Space Center, NASA, US
- New York University, US
- Institute of Aerospace Medicine, German Aerospace Centre, Cologne Germany
- Greek Aerospace Medical Association, Thessalonik Greece
- Medical University of Warsaw, Poland
- Kaunas University of Medicine, Lithuania
