= Deggendorf Institute of Technology =

University in Lower Bavaria, Germany

Coordinates: 48°49′47″N 12°57′17″E

- Established: 1994
- President: Peter Sperber
- Administrative staff: 800 (140 professors, 260 lecturers)
- Students: 9,122
- Location: Deggendorf, Bavaria, Germany
- Website: www.th-deg.de

The Deggendorf Institute of Technology (DIT) (German: Technische Hochschule Deggendorf) is a public applied sciences university in Lower Bavaria, Germany. Founded in 1994, the institutions offers undergraduate and graduate courses, and also doctoral programs in cooperation with Charles Sturt University. Deggendorf Institute of Technology offer courses on the areas of business, technology, digitalization and health.

== History ==
On November 26, 1991, the Bavarian Council of Ministers decided to establish a university of applied sciences in Deggendorf. This was founded in 1994 as the Deggendorf University of Applied Sciences for Technology and Business (in German: Fachhochschule Deggendorf–Hochschule für Technik und Wirtschaft) with Anton Baierer as the founding president. He was followed by Reinhard Höpfl as president of the university in 1994. On April 24, 1997, the foundation stone was laid for the university campus on the Danube, which was occupied in 1998.

In the 1999/2000 winter semester, over 1,000 students were enrolled for the first time. With the Innovation and Technology Campus ITC1, a university-related business park and start-up center was established in 2001. As part of the Bologna Process, the degree courses were converted to Bachelor's and Master's degrees in 2002. In the 2002/03 winter semester, the number of students exceeded 2,000 for the first time. Over 3,000 students enrolled at the university in the 2007/08 winter semester. From 2009, the university expanded with regional branches. The first of these were the technology campuses in Teisnach, Freyung and Cham.

In 2011, the name was changed from Hochschule für angewandte Wissenschaften Deggendorf to Technische Hochschule Deggendorf (THD). Nevertheless, it still has the status of university of applied sciences. Peter Sperber became president of the university in 2012. In 2014, the largest part of the extension building in Deggendorf was opened with a total of more than 5700 square meters of new floor space. In 2015, Deggendorf Institute of Technology opened the European Campus Rottal-Inn (ECRI) in Pfarrkirchen. It is the first English-only university location in Bavaria.

In 2021, the Cham campus became DIT's third study location. The university was granted independent doctoral rights in 2023. Waldemar Berg took over as university director in March 2024. In the following winter semester, the number of students exceeded 9,000 for the first time.

The institute is affiliated with the World Tourism Organization.

== International ==
Deggendorf Institute of Technology actively promotes internationality through the structure of its university programs and a global network of educational institutions, business and research partners. The university currently maintains partnerships with over 200 universities and colleges worldwide. The proportion of international students at DIT is almost 48 percent, making the school one of the most international universities of applied sciences in Bavaria

== Research ==
The Deggendorf Institute of Technology conducts research in the field of engineering with financial support from the Bavarian state government and in partnership with local companies.
