= Critical Care Air Transport Team =

The Critical Care Air Transport Team (CCATT) concept dates from 1988, when Col. P.K. Carlton and Maj. J. Chris Farmer originated the development of this program while stationed at U.S. Air Force Hospital Scott, Scott Air Force Base, Illinois. Dr. Carlton was the Hospital Commander, and Dr. Farmer was a staff intensivist. The program was developed because of an inability to transport and care for a patient who became critically ill during a trans-Atlantic air evac mission in a C-141. They envisioned a highly portable intensive care unit (ICU) with sophisticated capabilities, carried in backpacks, that would match on-the-ground ICU functionality.

This concept was further developed at Wilford Hall Medical Center in 1991–1992, when Dr. Carlton served as the 59th Medical Wing commander and the AETC/SG and Dr. Farmer, joined by Major Jay Johannigman, were intensivist colleagues at Wilford Hall. Together, they developed the first written concept of operations for this team, a table of allowances, and a plan of action for formalizing the CCATT program. The first table of allowances was developed on a Saturday, in an empty ICU room, by Drs. Johannigman and Farmer. They gathered various supplies, equipment, medical devices, and medications in this room. They agreed that this team should be able to care for 3 patients. Through the day, they bartered, added, and subtracted—ultimately limiting the supplies to a single grocery-sized cart. This became the first CCATT table of allowances.

Drs. Carlton, Johannigman, and Farmer traveled to AMC at Scott AFB and presented their concept of operations. They also presented the concept to the Joint Special Operations Command (JSOC). Ultimately, JSOC established a Unit Type Code (UTC) for CCATT, and the first deployment followed thereafter. Joined by then Lt. Col. Steve Derdak, Maj. Bill Beninati, Maj Tom Grissom, Maj. Mike Wall, Lt. Col. Rick Hersack, and many other key individuals the program developed during Joint Task Force (JTF) deployments in Cuba/Haiti, Eastern Europe, and Africa. In the late 1990s the graduate medical programs at Wilford Hall USAF Medical Center (59th Medical Wing) began to incorporate cardiovascular and critical care fellows into the CCAT teams. Dr. Jonathan Sheinberg and Dr. Walter Rustmann were the first fellows to participate in the CCAT team rotation. In addition to these several deployments from 1994–1996, there were numerous field exercises with various Air Evac units in CONUS and OCONUS as the UTC was further refined. CCATT teams were also deployed for civil disaster ICU medical support, including a 747 KAL crash in Guam, and a 707 cargo plane crash in Ecuador. The program fully realized its worth during the second Gulf War, when ICU casualty transport became a vital necessity. These ICU transport capabilities allowed trauma surgeons to perform far forward damage control surgery, knowing that these patients could be quickly transported rearward. Combined with other advances in field medical care, what resulted is the lowest died of wounds rate measured in modern times (testimony House Armed Services Committee, 2005, Lt.Gen. George "Peach" Taylor).

Today, the CCATT is a three-person, highly specialized medical asset that can create and operate a portable ICU on board any transport aircraft during flight. It is a limited, rapidly deployable resource and a primary component of the Air Force's aeromedical evacuation (AE) system. The CCATT team consists of a physician specializing in an area such as critical care, emergency medicine, anesthesiology, surgery, etc., along with a critical care nurse and a respiratory therapist. The CCATT, with special medical equipment, can turn almost any airframe into a flying intensive care unit within minutes. The team is experienced in the care of critically ill or injured patients with multi-system trauma, shock, burns, respiratory failure, multiple organ failure, or other life-threatening complications. The complex, critical nature of patients in hemodynamic flux requires continual stabilization, advanced care, and may even require life-saving invasive interventions during transport.
