= Aerospace Medical Association =

Professional organization in aviation, space, hyperbaric and environmental medicine

- Formation: 1929
- Type: Professional Association
- Headquarters: Alexandria, Virginia
- Location: United States
- Members: 2,137 as of 2024
- Official language: English
- President: Robert Orford (2024-2025)
- Executive Director: Jeffrey Sventek, MS, CAsP, FAsMA, FRAeS
- Publication: Aerospace Medicine and Human Performance (since 2015) Aviation, Space, and Environmental Medicine (1975–2015)
- Website: www.asma.org

The Aerospace Medical Association (AsMA) is the largest professional organization in the fields of aviation, space, and environmental medicine. The AsMA membership includes aerospace and hyperbaric medical specialists, scientists, flight nurses, physiologists, and researchers from all over the world.

== Mission ==
The Aerospace Medical Association's mission is to raise awareness of health, safety, and performance of individuals working in aerospace-related field through application of scientific method.

== History ==
The AsMA was founded under the guidance of Louis H. Bauer, M.D., in 1929. Bauer was the first medical director of the Aeronautics Branch of the Department of Commerce which became the Federal Aviation Administration (FAA). The original 29 "aeromedical examiners" started the organization for the "dissemination of information, as it will enhance the accuracy of their specialized art...thereby affording a greater guarantee for the safety of the public and the pilot, alike; and to cooperate... in furthering the progress of aeronautics in the United States." Hubertus Strughold, the "Father of Space Medicine", co-founder of the Space Medicine Branch of the AsMA in 1950.

== Membership ==
The AsMA has more than 2,000 members, approximately 30% of the membership is international from over 70 countries.

== Publications ==
The AsMA produces many publications including:

- Aerospace Medicine and Human Performance - A peer reviewed monthly publication that was first published in 2015 and is indexed in PubMed. (ISSN 2375-6314)
- Aviation, Space, and Environmental Medicine - A peer reviewed monthly publication that was published from 1975 to 2015 and is indexed in PubMed. (ISSN 0095-6562)
- Aerospace medicine - The preceding journal to Aviation, Space, and Environmental Medicine was published from 1959 to 1974. (ISSN 0001-9402)
- The Journal of Aviation Medicine - The preceding journal to Aerospace medicine was published from 1930 to 1959. (ISSN 0095-991X)
- Medical Guidelines for Airline Passengers
- Medical Guidelines for Airline Travel

== See also ==
- Civil Aerospace Medical Institute – Medical research branch of the Office of Aerospace Medicine

== External resources ==
- AsMA Homepage
- Aviation, Space, and Environmental Medicine Journal - Volume 74, Number 1, January 2003 to current
