= Oliver Sartor =

American oncologist

- Education: Tulane University
- Scientific career
- Fields: Oncology
- Workplaces: Tulane School of Medicine

Oliver Sartor is an American oncologist and research scientist. He is currently the director of the Transformational Prostate Cancer Research Center at East Jefferson General Hospital Cancer Center in Metairie, Louisiana and adjunct faculty at Tulane University School of Medicine. He was previously the chair of the genitourinary cancer disease group and director of radiopharmaceutical clinical trials at Mayo Clinic Rochester, and before that he was the assistant dean for oncology and the C.E. and Bernadine Laborde Professor of Cancer Research, Medicine and Urology Departments at the Tulane School of Medicine in New Orleans, Louisiana. His research has mainly focused on translational science and clinical research trials of advanced prostate cancer since 1990 and he is recognized as an expert in that field through his contributions to the practice and the publishing of over 500 peer-reviewed articles and numerous book chapters and reviews. Sartor also serves as the editor-in-chief of the bimonthly journal Clinical Genitourinary Cancer that mainly focuses on research in genitourinary oncology.

== Education and career ==
Sartor attended Tulane University, where he received his MD in 1982 with honors. He then served as an intern at the University of Pennsylvania. After the internship, he served a residency in internal medicine at Tulane Medical School and then completed a medical oncology fellowship at the National Cancer Institute (NCI) in 1989.

He joined the faculty at NCI, where he became a senior investigator mainly focusing on novel therapeutics for patients with advanced prostate cancer. He served as faculty at the NCI from 1990 till 1993, when he later returned to Louisiana and joined the faculty of LSU Medical School in Shreveport as an associate professor. In 1998, Sartor became professor of oncology, director at the Stanley S. Scott Cancer Center, and a chief of Hematology/Oncology section at LSU Medical School in New Orleans. He was named the co-director of Louisiana Cancer Research Consortium in 2002. Sartor left LSU after Hurricane Katrina and in 2006 joined the faculty of Harvard Medical School and the Lank Center for Genitourinary Oncology at the Dana Farber Cancer Institute. In January 2008, Sartor was appointed as professor in the Medicine and Urology Departments at Tulane University. He was later appointed the medical director at the Tulane Cancer Center in July 2010 and has served as assistant dean for oncology since 2016. He has served as medical oncology co-chair of the Genitourinary Committee of NRG (formerly RTOG) since 2006 and has served on the NCI Board of Scientific Counselors (Clinical and Epidemiology) since 2014.

== Research ==
Throughout his academic career, Sartor has worked as a researcher, almost exclusively focused on prostate cancer. He has earned international recognition, particularly as an expert in advanced prostate cancer. He has published extensively on both prostate cancer translational studies and clinical trials that involve novel agents.

Sartor was the PI or co-PI on four prostate cancer studies pivotal for FDA drug approval including Samarium-153 EDTMP, Cabazitaxel, Radium-223, and Leuprolide Acetate 30 mg sustained release (Eligard). In addition he has served as chair of the Data Monitor Committee for numerous phase III trials, including 6 trials pivotal for FDA approval.
