= Peter Fagan (psychologist) =

American psychologist

Peter Jerome Fagan is an American psychologist who served as director of the Sexual Behaviors Consultation Unit at Johns Hopkins University from 1985 to 2004.

After earning a bachelor's degree in 1963 from St. Johns Seminary, Fagan received his masters in divinity there in 1973. That same year he earned a Master of Arts degree in education from the University of Notre Dame. He earned his doctoral degree in clinical psychology from George Washington University in 1984. Fagan became director of clinical services, TRICARE/USFHP mental health and substance abuse at Johns Hopkins Bayview Physicians in 1994. He completed a postdoctoral fellowship in the Department of Health Policy and Management at the Johns Hopkins Bloomberg School of Public Health during 2004–2005. Fagan's research focus is integrating behavioral and medical managed care, especially among Medicaid recipients. He has also written about transgender issues, and applied a four-perspective model to psychosexual issues.

== Selected bibliography ==
- Fagan PJ, Schmidt CW, Cook B. A model for managed behavioral health care in an academic department of psychiatry. Psychiatric Services 53:4, (2002), 431–436.
- Fagan PJ, Wise TN, Schmidt CW, Berlin FS: Pedophilia. JAMA, 288:19 (2002), 2458–2465. 15.
- Fagan, PJ, Burnett AL, Rogers L, & Schmidt, CW. Sexuality and Sexual Disorders. In J Burton, J Fiebach, D Kern, TP Zieve, R Ziegelstein, (Eds.), Principles of Ambulatory Medicine, Sixth Edition, Lippincott, Williams & Wilkins. (2003), 69-91
- Fagan, PJ. Sexual Disorders: Perspectives on evaluation and treatment. The Johns Hopkins University Press. (2004). ISBN 978-0-8018-7527-4
- Seow H, Piet L, Kenworthy CM, Jones S, Fagan PJ, Dy SM. Evaluating a Palliative Care Case Management Program for Cancer Patients: The Omega Life Program. Journal of Palliative Medicine. December 1, 2008, 11(10): 1314–1318. doi:10.1089/jpm.2008.0140.
- Carroll P, Lanzkron S, Haywood C, Fagan P. The Course and Correlates of High Hospital Utilization in Sickle Cell Disease: Evidence from a large, urban Medicaid Managed Care Organization. American Journal of Hematology
- Lanzkron S, Haywood C, Fagan P, Rand C. Examining the Effectiveness of Hydroxyurea in People with Sickle Cell Disease. The Journal of Health Care for the Poor and Underserved
- Fagan PJ. Perspectives on Sex and Normality. In Saleh FM (ed.) Sex Offenders: Identification, Risk Assessment, Treatment, and Legal Issues. Oxford University Press, 2009. ISBN 978-0-19-517704-6
