= Military Health System =

Health care system for the U.S. military

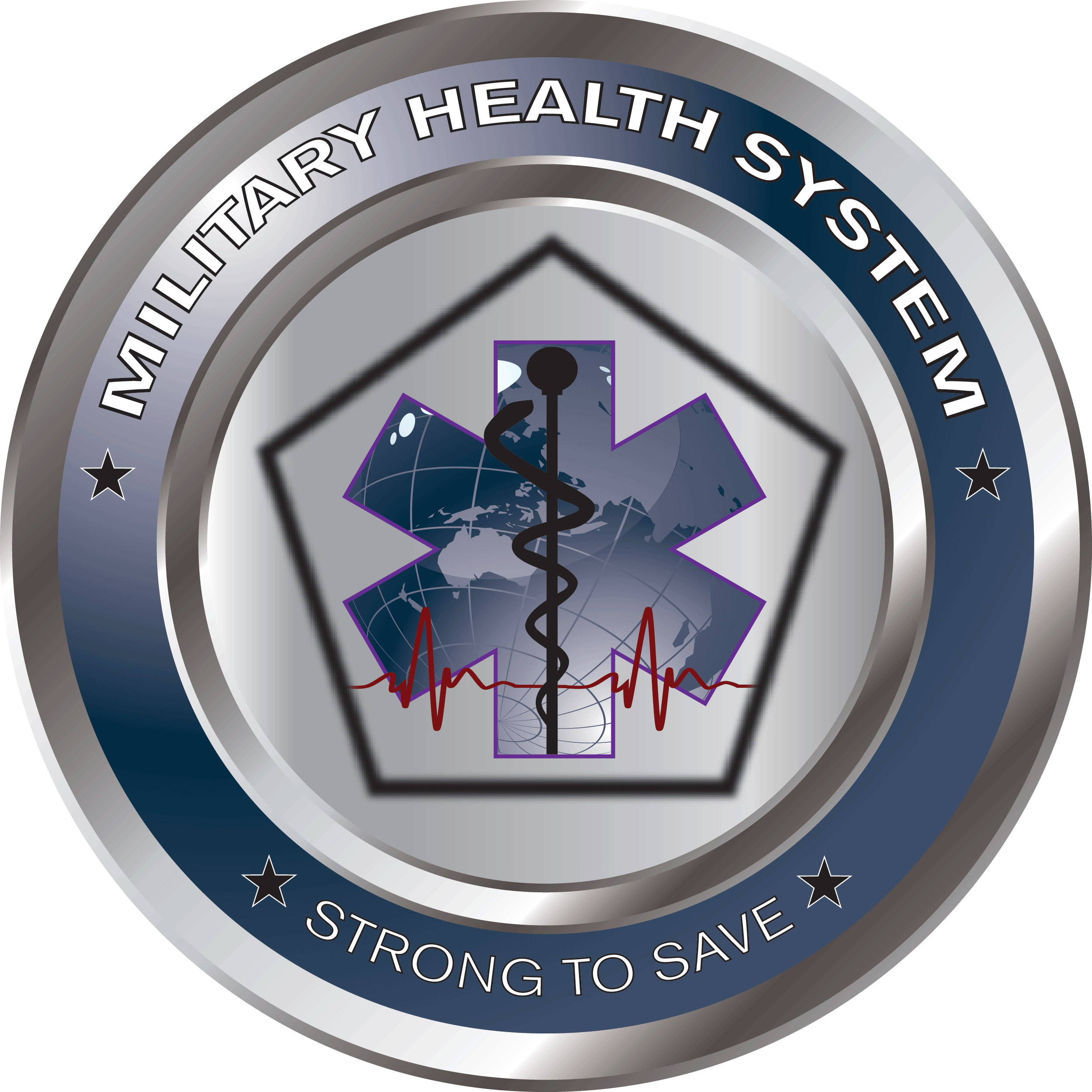

Agency overview
- Headquarters: Falls Church, Virginia
- Employees: 137,000
- Annual budget: $50 billion
- Agency executive: Dr. Stephen Ferrara, Acting Assistant Secretary of Defense for Health Affairs
- Website: health.mil

The Military Health System (MHS) is the internal health care system operated within the United States Department of Defense that provides health care to active duty, reserve component and retired U.S. military personnel and their dependents.

The missions of the MHS are complex and interrelated:

- To ensure America’s 1.4 million active duty and 331,000 reserve-component personnel are healthy so they can complete their national security missions.
- To ensure that all active and reserve medical personnel in uniform are trained and ready to provide medical care in support of operational forces around the world.
- To provide a medical benefit commensurate with the service and sacrifice of more than 9.5 million active duty personnel, military retirees and their families.

The MHS also provides health care, through the TRICARE health plan, to:

- active duty service members and their families,
- retired service members and their families,
- Reserve component members and their families,
- surviving family members,
- Medal of Honor recipients and their families
- some former spouses, and
- others identified as eligible in the Defense Enrollment Eligibility Reporting System.

Such care has been made available since 1966, (with certain limitations and co-payments), through the Civilian Health and Medical Program of the Uniformed Services (CHAMPUS) and now through the TRICARE health plan. In October 2001, TRICARE benefits were extended to retirees and their dependents aged 65 and over. On Oct. 1, 2013, the Defense Health Agency replaced the TRICARE Management Activity.

The MHS has a $50+ billion budget and serves approximately 9.5 million beneficiaries. The actual cost of having a government-run health care system for the military is higher because the wages and benefits paid for military personnel who work for the MHS and the retirees who formerly worked for it, is not included in the budget. The MHS employs more than 144,217 in 51 hospitals, 424 clinics, 248 dental clinics and 251 veterinary facilities across the nation and around the world, as well as in contingency and combat-theater operations worldwide.

== History ==
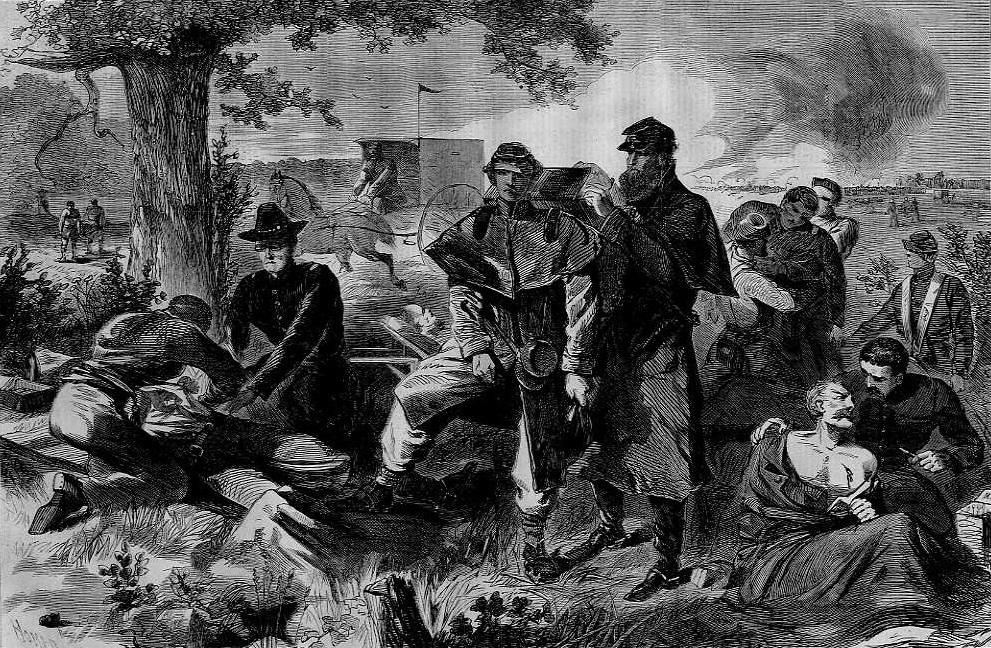
The Surgeon at Work at the Rear During an Engagement, 1862

Before the Civil War, medical care in the military was provided largely by the regimental surgeon and surgeons' mates. While attempts were made to establish a centralized medical system, care provision was largely local and limited. Treatment for disease and injury was, by modern standards, primitive.

The Civil War saw improvements in medical science, communications and transportation that made centralized casualty collection and treatment more practical.

In World War I, the U.S. Army Medical Department expanded and developed its organization and structure. Care began on the battlefield and was then transferred to successively better levels of medical capability. Much of this capability was located in the combat theater so that soldiers could be easily returned to duty if possible.

Expansion continued during World War II, but without the benefit of an organizational plan.

After World War II, the Executive Branch of the U.S. Government was reorganized. The Department of War and Department of the Navy were merged into a single Department of Defense (DOD). This caused friction between the Army and Navy medical corps. Furthermore, the Air Force, originally part of the Army, was created as a separate military service with its own separate Medical Service.

Changes in the perception of health care after World War II and an assessment of medical services provided to dependents caused Congress to re-evaluate the dependent health care benefit in the late 1950s. Changes in tax law had induced business and industry to begin offering a health care benefit as an employment incentive. A 1956 Department of Defense estimate was that 40 percent of active duty dependents did not have access to federal facilities due to distance, incomplete medical coverage at the federal facility, or due to the saturation of services at military treatment facilities. Congress responded by passing the Dependents Medical Care Act of 1956 and the Military Medical Benefits Amendments of 1966. These acts created the program known as the Civilian Health and Medical Program of the Uniformed Services (CHAMPUS).

In the late 1980s, because of escalating costs, claims paperwork demands and general beneficiary dissatisfaction, DOD launched a series of demonstration projects. Under a program known as the CHAMPUS Reform Initiative (CRI), a contractor provided both health care and administrative-related services, including claims processing. The CRI project was one of the first to introduce managed care features to the CHAMPUS program. Beneficiaries under CRI were offered three choices: a health maintenance organization-like option called CHAMPUS Prime that required enrollment and offered better benefits and low-cost shares, a preferred provider organization-like option called CHAMPUS Extra that required use of network providers in exchange for lower cost shares, and the standard CHAMPUS option that continued the freedom of choice in selecting providers and higher cost shares and deductibles.

Although DOD's initial intent under CRI was to award three competitively bid contracts covering six states, it received only one bid, from Foundation Health Corporation (now Health Net) covering California and Hawaii. Foundation delivered services under this contract between August 1988 and January 1994.

In late 1993, driven by requirements in the DoD Appropriation Act for Fiscal Year 1994, DoD announced plans to implement by May 1997 a nationwide managed care program for the MHS. Under this program, known as TRICARE, the United States would be divided into 12 health care regions. An administrative organization, the lead agent, was designated for each region and coordinated the health care needs of all military treatment facilities in each region. Under TRICARE, seven managed care support contracts were awarded covering DoD's 12 health care regions.

TRICARE has been restructured several times, with contract regions having been redrawn, Base Realignment and Closure, and by adding "TRICARE For Life" benefits in 2001 for those who are Medicare-eligible.

== Coverage gaps ==
As of 2010, about 1.3 million of the 12.5 million nonelderly veterans in the United States did not have health insurance coverage or access to Veterans Affairs (VA) health care, according to a 2012 report by the Urban Institute and the Robert Wood Johnson Foundation that used 2010 data from the Census Bureau and the 2009 and 2010 National Health Interview Surveys (NHIS). The report also found that:

- When family members of veterans are included, the uninsured total rises to 2.3 million.
- An additional 900,000 veterans use VA health care but have no other coverage.
- Uninsured veterans are more likely to be male (90%), non-Hispanic white (70%), unmarried (58%) and earned a high school degree (41%).
- More than 40% are younger than 45.

The US Patient Protection and Affordable Care Act, enacted in 2010, has provisions intended to make it easier for uninsured veterans to obtain coverage. Under the act, veterans with incomes at or below 138% of the Federal Poverty Line ($30,429 for a family of four in 2010) would qualify for coverage as of January 2014; this group constitutes nearly 50% of veterans who are currently uninsured. Another 40.1% of veterans and 49% of their families have incomes that qualify for new subsidies through health insurance exchanges with the PPACA.

Additionally, most Tricare plans are currently exempt from conforming to the new healthcare laws under the PPACA. Several bills have been proposed since the PPACA was enacted in 2010, including the most recent S. 358, "Access to Contraception for Women Servicemembers and Dependents Act of 2015" sponsored by Senior Senator from New Hampshire Jeanne Shaheen. Under most current Tricare plans (with the exception of Prime), the health benefit is not considered "insurance" and does not cover women's contraceptives at 100% with no cost-sharing, deductibles, or co-payments.

Female military servicemembers and female dependents of servicemembers continue to pay out of pocket for contraceptive services they receive at civilian doctor's offices under plans such as Tricare Standard, where the services are not rendered at a Military Treatment Facility by DoD doctors or contractors. However, The Military Health System, The Defense Health Agency, and Tricare all advertise that they meet the "minimum essential coverage" standard for all military servicemembers. Additionally, the Defense Finance and Accounting Service reports for servicemembers to the Internal Revenue Service each year that every Tricare-eligible servicemember has a health benefit that meets the requirements of "minimum essential coverage", even though Tricare coverage does not meet the standards of minimum essential coverage.

== Components ==
Led by the Office of the Assistant Secretary of Defense for Health Affairs, the Military Health System includes several core organizational areas including:

- Defense Health Agency (DHA)
- Joint Staff Surgeon
- Uniformed Services University of the Health Sciences (USUHS)
- Military Treatment Facilities

The MHS also includes the medical departments of the Army, Navy, and Air Force, and TRICARE-authorized providers (including private sector healthcare providers, hospitals and pharmacies).

== Facilities ==
See Category:Medical installations of the United States Department of Defense.

== See also ==
- Assistant Secretary of Defense for Health Affairs
- Military medicine
- Defense Health Agency
- Surgeon General of the United States Army
- Surgeon General of the United States Navy
- Surgeon General of the United States Air Force
- TRICARE
- Uniformed Services University of the Health Sciences
- US Family Health Plan
- Defense Health Program Budget Activity Group
