= Lee E. Payne =

Retired U.S. Air Force general

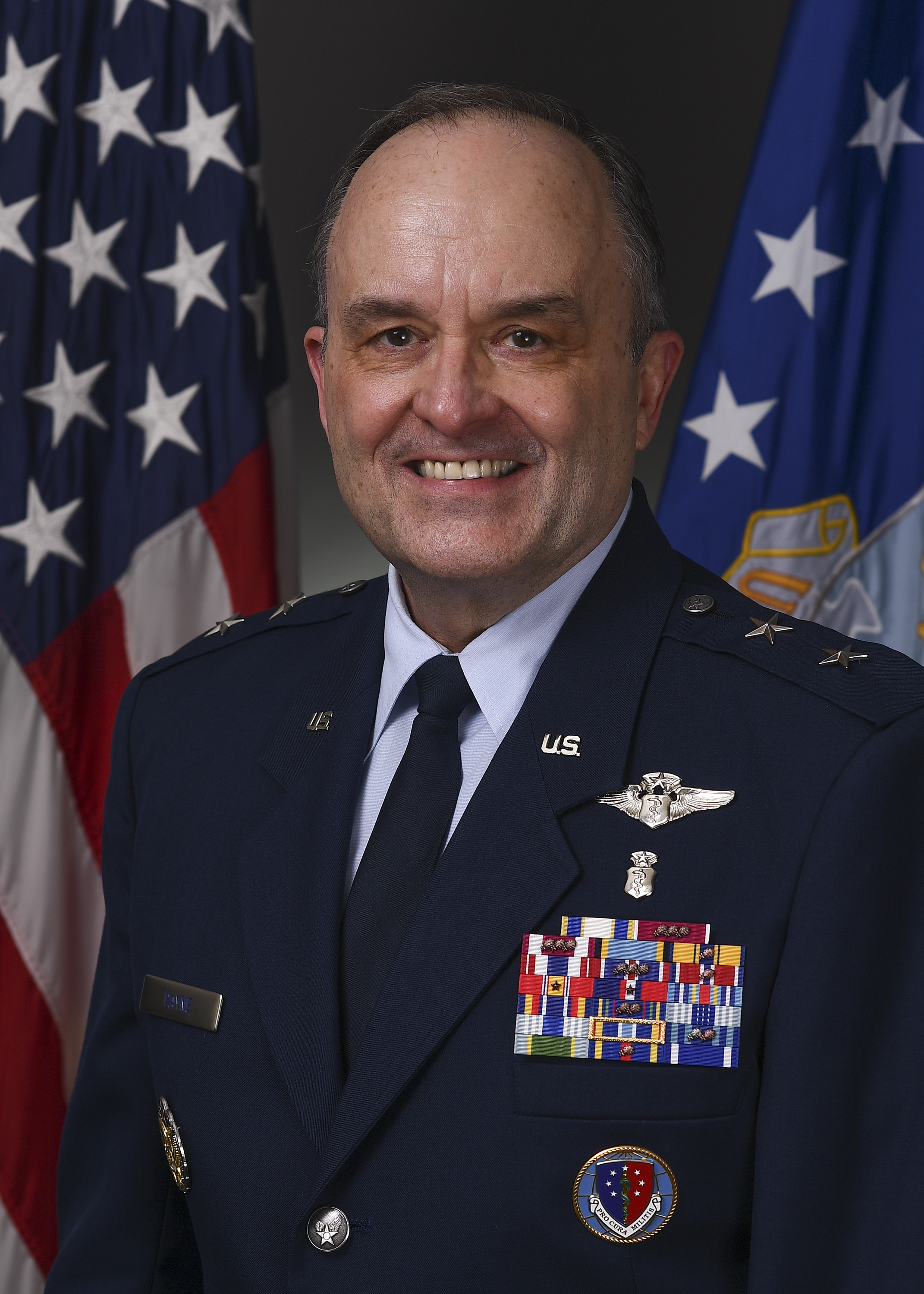
- Official portrait, 2019
- Military career
- Allegiance: United States
- Branch: United States Air Force
- Service years: 1979–2020
- Rank: Major General
- Commands: Air Force Medical Operations Agency; 60th Medical Group; 31st Medical Group; 39th Medical Group; 325th Medical Operations Squadron
- Awards: Air Force Distinguished Service Medal; Legion of Merit (4)

Lee E. Payne is a medical surgeon and retired United States Air Force major general who last served as the Assistant Director for Combat Support of the Defense Health Agency. He was previously the Command Surgeon of the Air Mobility Command.

Military offices
Preceded by Sean L. Murphy	Commander of the Air Force Medical Operations Agency; 2014–2016	Succeeded by Robert I. Miller
Preceded by Kory Cornum	Command Surgeon of the Air Mobility Command; 2016–2018	Succeeded by Robert J. Marks
Preceded by ???	Assistant Director for Combat Support of the Defense Health Agency; 2018–2020	Succeeded by George Appenzeller
