= William K. Oh =

American cancer researcher

William K. Oh, M.D.
- Education: Yale University, NYU
- Medical career
- Profession: medical oncologist
- Institutions: Harvard Medical School; Mount Sinai Medical Center; Yale School of Medicine
- Sub-specialties: genitourinary oncology
- Research: cancer research

William K. Oh, is an American medical oncologist, academic leader and expert in the management of prostate cancer. He has also held leadership roles in industry and non-profits, including as current Chair of the American Cancer Society’s National Prostate Cancer Roundtable.

Oh is Director of Precision Medicine for Yale Cancer Center and Smilow Cancer Hospital. He is also Medical Director for the Cancer Service Line at Smilow Cancer Hospital in Greenwich. He previously served as Chief Medical Officer for the Prostate Cancer Foundation, the world’s leading philanthropy for prostate cancer. He was also CMO of Sema4 (now known as GeneDx), a publicly traded genomics and health intelligence company. For 11 years, Oh was Chief of the Division of Hematology and Medical Oncology at The Mount Sinai Medical Center in New York City, Deputy Director at Mount Sinai's NCI-designated Tisch Cancer Institute, Professor of Medicine and Urology and the Ezra M. Greenspan, M.D., Professor in Clinical Cancer Therapeutics at The Icahn School of Medicine at Mount Sinai.

Oh is the author of more than 400 publications. He is the editor of 6 books and the author of 25 book chapters. He has been repeatedly listed in Castle Connolly's "America's Top Doctors for Cancer", "Best Doctors in America”, and in New York Magazine's "Top Doctors" from 2010–2025. He has been named a Top AAPI doctor for 2023, 2024 and 2025.

== Biography ==
Oh earned a B.S. from Yale University in 1987 and his M.D. from New York University School of Medicine in 1992. He completed an internship and a residency at Brigham and Women's Hospital in Boston and a clinical fellowship at the Dana–Farber Cancer Institute.

From 1997 to 2009, Oh served on the faculty of Harvard Medical School, where he was Associate Professor of Medicine and Clinical Director of the Lank Center for Genitourinary Oncology. In 2009, he joined The Mount Sinai Medical Center as the Ezra M. Greenspan Professor in Clinical Cancer Therapeutics and Professor of Medicine and Urology, as well as Chief of the Division of Hematology and Medical Oncology in Mount Sinai's Department of Medicine.

Oh is a leading member of the American Society of Clinical Oncology. He has served on multiple editorial boards including the journals The Prostate, Clinical Genitourinary Cancer, the American Journal of Hematology and Oncology and CA – A Cancer Journal for Clinicians.

He co-edited the book Mount Sinai Expert Guides: Oncology which was published in 2019.

Oh has been the principal investigator on multiple clinical trials of chemotherapy in castration-resistant (CRPC) prostate cancer and for three trials of neoadjuvant chemotherapy in high-risk localized prostate cancer patients.

At the Dana–Farber Cancer Institute, from 2000 to 2009, Oh developed and managed a prospective clinical database linked to blood and tissue banks for more than 8,000 prostate cancer patients, with links to blood samples and tissue repositories, for exploration of research and prognostic applications, including: efficacy of various therapies in CRPC, hormonal therapy, testosterone as a marker for cancer outcome, relapse predictions based on nutritional factors at diagnosis and autoantibody signatures, and assessment of pharmacogenomic patterns predicting Gleason score. At Mount Sinai and Sema4, he continued his work in precision medicine by continuing to leverage clinicogenomic databases to understand cancer outcomes.

Oh served in leadership roles as CMO of Sema4/GeneDx, a health intelligence company spun out of Mount Sinai, as well the Prostate Cancer Foundation, a 30 year old philanthropy dedicated to discovering new treatments for advanced prostate cancer. At PCF, he led a panel and paper recommending Guidelines for PSA Screening of Black Men in the US, published in NEJM Evidence.

He recently returned to academic medicine at Yale School of Medicine as Professor of Medicine and Director of Precision Medicine for Yale Cancer Center and Smilow Cancer Hospital.

== Honors and awards ==
- 1992 Alpha Omega Alpha
- 2003–present, Best Doctors in America
- 2005 2009 Boston Magazine "Top Doctors"
- 2007–2008 Brigham/Harvard Business School Physician Leadership Program
- 2008–present, America's Top Doctors for Cancer (Castle Connolly)
- 2010 Prostate Cancer Foundation Creativity Award
- 2010–present, New York Magazine "Top Doctors"
- 2011 Election to the American Society of Clinical Investigation (ASCI)
- 2013 Fellow, American College of Physicians (FACP)
- 2023, 2024, 2015 Castle Connolly Top AAPI Doctor
- 2010-2024, NY Super Doctors Hall of Fame
- 2025–present, Connecticut Magazine “Top Doctors”

== Publications ==
Partial list:

- Oh WK, Kantoff PW (October 1998). "Hormone-refractory prostate cancer: current standards and future prospects". J Urol. 160 (4): 1220–29. doi:10.1016/S0022-5347(01)62501-1. PMID 9751323.
- Oh WK, Halabi S, Kelly WK, et al. (December 2003). "A phase II study of estramustine, docetaxel, and carboplatin with granulocyte-colony-stimulating factor support in patients with hormone-refractory prostate carcinoma: Cancer and Leukemia Group B 99813". Cancer. 98 (12): 2592–8. doi:10.1002/cncr.11829. PMID 14669278.
- Febbo PG, Richie JP, George DJ, et al. (July 2005). "Neoadjuvant docetaxel before radical prostatectomy in patients with high-risk localized prostate cancer". Clin. Cancer Res. 11 (14): 5233–40. doi:10.1158/1078-0432.CCR-05-0299. PMID 16033841.
- Oh WK, Hayes J, Evan C, et al. (June 2006). "Development of an integrated prostate cancer research information system". Clin Genitourin Cancer. 5 (1): 61–6. doi:10.3816/CGC.2006.n.019. PMID 16859581.
- Oh WK, Landrum MB, Lamont EB, McNeil BJ, Keating NL (March 2010). "Does oral antiandrogen use before leuteinizing hormone-releasing hormone therapy in patients with metastatic prostate cancer prevent clinical consequences of a testosterone flare?". Urology. 75 (3): 642–7. doi:10.1016/j.urology.2009.08.008. PMID 19962733.
- Ross RW, Oh WK, Xie W, et al. (February 2008). "Inherited variation in the androgen pathway is associated with the efficacy of androgen-deprivation therapy in men with prostate cancer". J. Clin. Oncol. 26 (6): 842–7. doi:10.1200/JCO.2007.13.6804. PMID 18281655.
- Ross RW, Galsky MD, Scher HI, Magidson J, Wassmann K, Lee GS, Katz L, Subudhi SK, Anand A, Fleisher M, Kantoff PW, Oh WK (November 2012). "A whole-blood RNA transcript-based prognostic model in men with castration-resistant prostate cancer: a prospective study". Lancet Oncol. 13 (11): 1105–13. doi:10.1016/S1470-2045(12)70263-2. PMID 23059047.
- Jun T, Oh WK (July 2022). ""Does Circulating Tumor DNA Measure Up to Prostate-Specific Antigen?"". JAMA Oncol. 8 (7): 972–974. doi:10.1001/jamaoncol.2022.0511. PMID 35551363.
- Guin S, Liaw BK, Jun T, Ayers K, Patel B, O'Connell T, Deitz M, Klein M, Mullaney T, Prentice T, Newman S, Fink M, Zhou X, Schadt EE, Chen R, Oh WK (August 2022). ""Management of de novo metastatic hormone-sensitive prostate cancer: A comprehensive report of a single-center experience."". PLOS ONE. 17 (8) e0264800. Bibcode:2022PLoSO..1764800G. doi:10.1371/journal.pone.0264800. PMC 9390935. PMID 35984843.
