= Fourth Estate (Department of Defense) =

American political jargon term

The Fourth Estate is a jargon term for the portions of the United States Department of Defense that are not the military services, including:

- the Defense Acquisition University
- the Defense Contract Audit Agency (DCAA)
- the Defense Contract Management Agency (DCMA)
- the Defense Finance and Accounting Service (DFAS)
- the Defense Health Agency (DHA)
- the Defense Human Resources Activity
- the Defense Information Systems Agency (DISA) (Note: The first member of the Fourth Estate, created in 1960)
- the Defense Legal Services Agency
- the Defense Logistics Agency (DLA)
- the Defense Media Activity (DMA)
- the Defense Technology Security Administration
- the Missile Defense Agency (MDA)
- the Defense Advanced Research Project Agency (DARPA)
- the Defense Threat Reduction Agency (DTRA)
- the Office of Economic Adjustment.

Fourth Estate entities are all organizational entities in DoD that are not in the military departments, IC agencies, or combatant commands. These include the defense agencies and DoD field activities.

Together they consumed 18% of the Department of Defense budget in 2018.

== See also ==
- Combat support agency, another group of agencies with some overlap including DCMA, DHA, DISA, and DLA
