= Oil Can Henry's =

American chain of automotive service shops

- Type: Subsidiary
- Founded: 1972 (Portland, Oregon)
- Headquarters: Tualatin, Oregon; 45.381294°N 122.771283°W
- Products: Oil change, car maintenance
- Parent: Ashland Inc.
- Website: www.oilcanhenrys.com

Oil Can Henry's was an oil-change shop based in Tualatin, Oregon, United States. Prior to being bought by Ashland Inc. in 2015, the company operated as a franchisor, and had locations in Oregon, Washington, Idaho, California, Arizona, Colorado and Minnesota. After the acquisition, the shops were re-branded as Valvoline Instant Oil Change locations.

One feature of these shops was that they did not have waiting rooms; instead, customers watched the service from their car using a monitor that displayed live video from cameras placed around the car, and were also given a free newspaper to read (either local or USA Today). Employees were known for their uniforms that feature a bow tie and a newsboy cap. The company motto was "The One You Can Trust".

== History ==
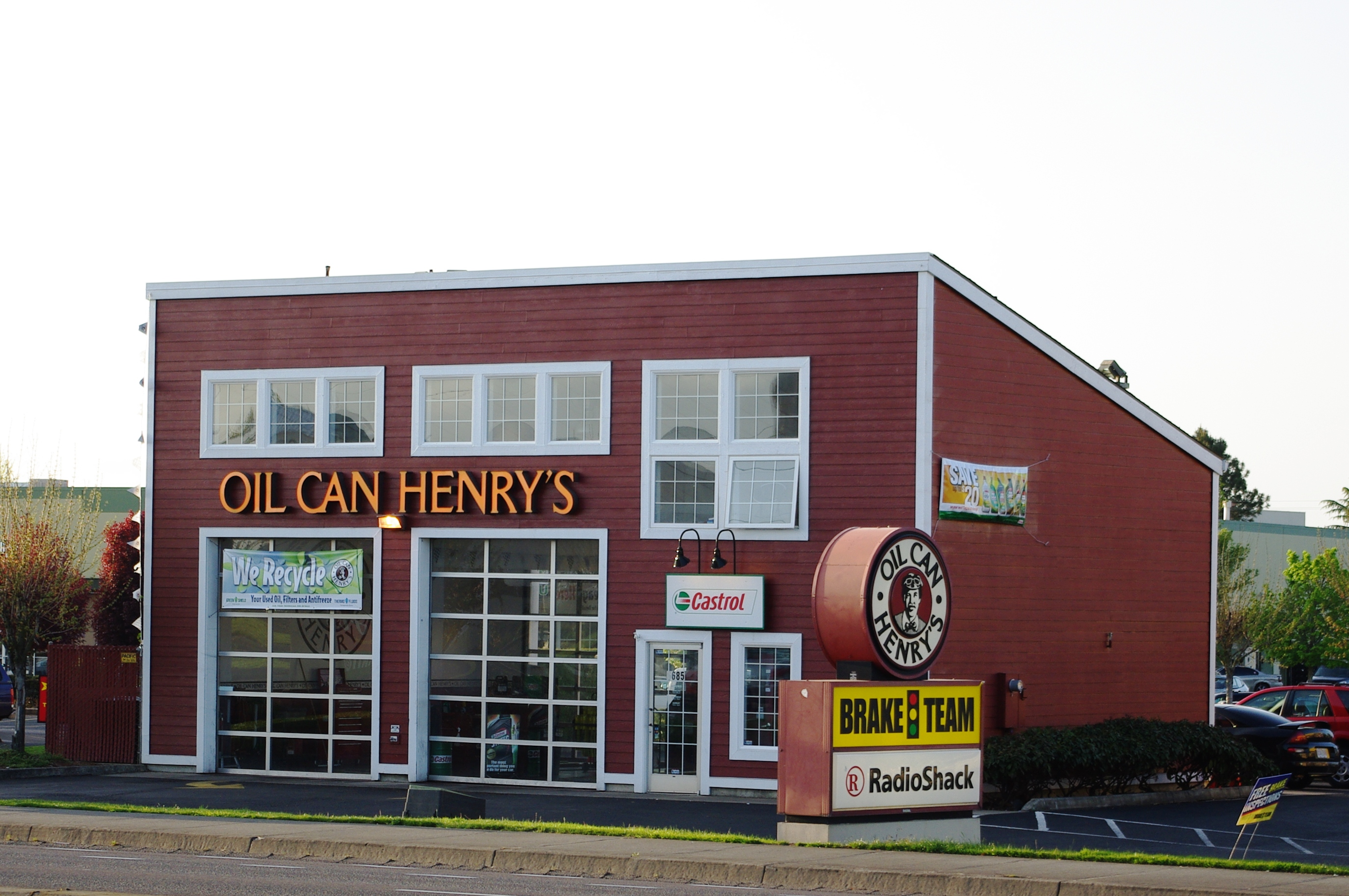
A franchise in Hillsboro, Oregon, featuring the company's standard architectural style

Oil Can Henry's was founded in 1978 by Marshall Stevens, a Tigard, Oregon, real estate developer. In 1988, the Shepanek family and friends purchased the company for $340,000, while Stevens continued to own franchises. Then named OCH International, the company began selling franchises in 1989. Sales at the company grew to $15 million in 1996.

The company was the nation's 18th largest oil change company in 1997. That year Oil Can Henry's signed a deal with Valvoline that included loan guarantees, payments to franchisees to help cover start-up costs, and a discount on oil. By April 2007, the company had grown to 67 locations, with ten of those as company-owned shops. Stevens had to sell 12 of 14 of his locations in 1991 due to financial problems.

Oil Can Henry's and its customers donated a total of $71,000 to the National Military Family Association in late 2014.

Oil Can Henry's and its franchisees donated $91,000 to the National Military Family Association in November, 2015.

OCH International sold to Ashland Inc. on December 11, 2015, which also owns the Valvoline brand.

== Operations ==
The company had locations in six different western states: Washington, Oregon, California, Idaho, Arizona, and Colorado, with the majority of the shops located in Oregon and Washington. Oil Can Henry's also offered a variety of other vehicle maintenance services in addition to oil changes.

The original store location in Tigard is called "Gearhart's Lubricatorium," featuring Steampunk-style gear-operated oil dispensers adorned with velvet and brass, based around the organization's fictional founder, "Henry Gearhart."

== See also ==
- Jiffy Lube
- Les Schwab Tire Centers
