= Peter Fagan =

Peter Fagan may refer to:

- Peter Fagan (psychologist), American psychologist
- Peter Fagan (politician), American politician, member of the Vermont House of Representatives
- Peter Fagan, Australian politician, see Candidates of the Queensland state election, 2006
- Peter Fagan, American journalist, fiancé of Helen Keller
