= George Appenzeller =

U.S. Army general

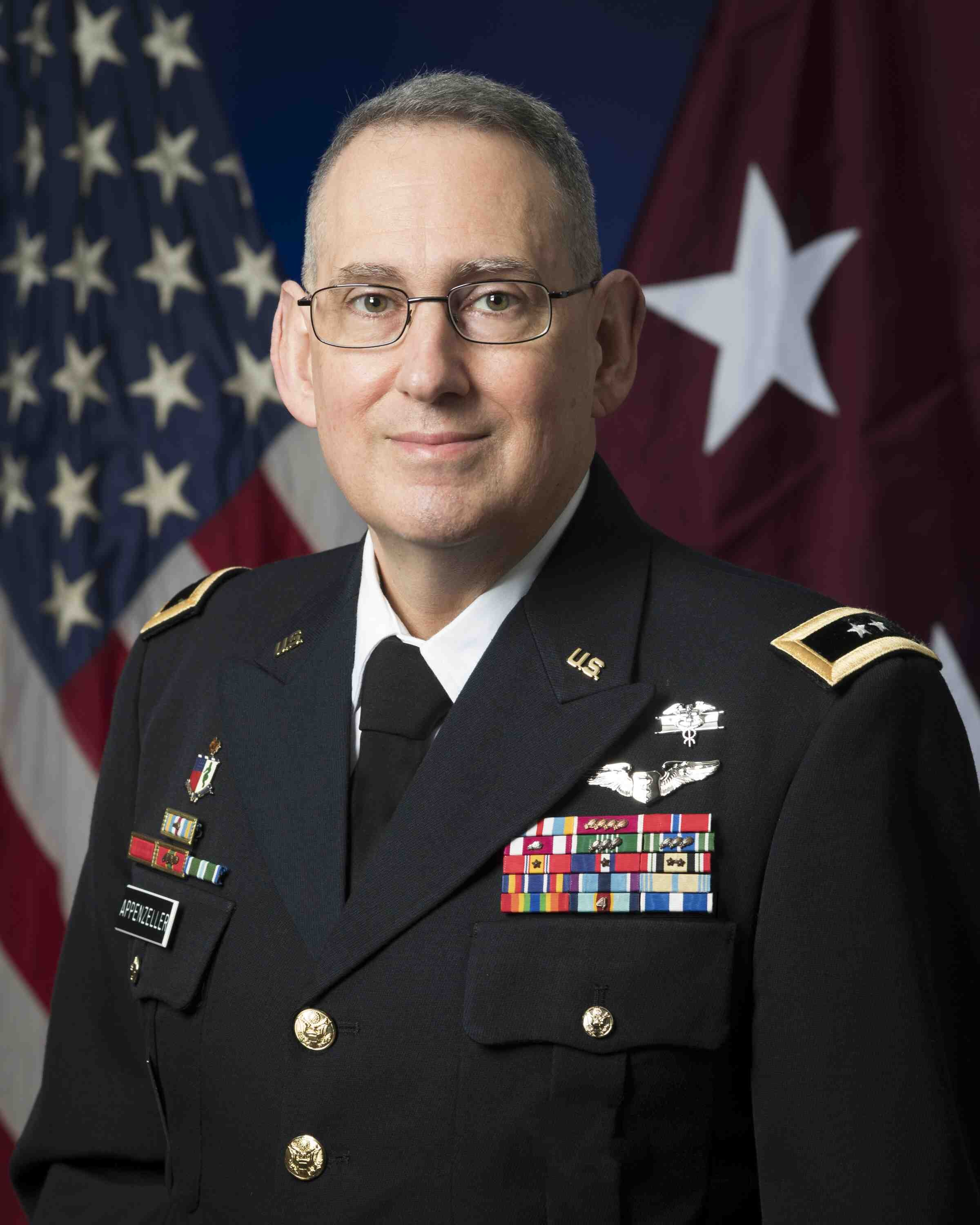
- Official portrait, 2021
- Military career
- Allegiance: United States
- Branch: United States Army
- Rank: Major General
- Nickname: Ned
- Commands: Regional Health Command-Central; Brooke Army Medical Center; Blanchfield Army Community Hospital
- Conflicts: Iraq War
- Awards: Defense Superior Service Medal; Legion of Merit (5); Bronze Star Medal

George N. Appenzeller is a retired United States Army major general who last served as the director of market support activities of the Defense Health Agency from 2023 to 2024. He served as the deputy surgeon general of the United States Army from December 2022 to October 2023 and deputy commanding general for operations of the United States Army Medical Command from August 2022 to September 2023. He served as the assistant director for combat support and director of healthcare operations of the Defense Health Agency from 2020 to 2022. Previously, he served as the commanding general of Regional Health Command-Central from 2019 to 2020.

Military offices
Preceded by Ronald T. Stephens	Deputy Commanding General of Regional Health Command-Pacific; 201?–2018	Succeeded by Michael L. Place
Preceded by Jeffrey J. Johnson	Commanding General of the Brooke Army Medical Center and Deputy Commanding General of Regional Health Command-Central; 2018–2019	Succeeded by Wendy L. Harter
Preceded by Jeffrey J. Johnson	Commanding General of Regional Health Command-Central; 2019–2020	Succeeded by Wendy L. Harter
Preceded by Lee E. Payne	Assistant Director for Combat Support and Director of Healthcare Operations of the Defense Health Agency; 2020–2022	Vacant
Preceded by Guy Kiyokawa	Deputy Director of the Defense Health Agency; Acting; 2022	Succeeded by Michael P. Malanoski
Preceded by Michael J. Talley	Deputy Commanding General for Operations of the United States Army Medical Command; 2022–2023	Succeeded by Thad J. Collard
Preceded by Telita Crosland	Deputy Surgeon General of the United States Army; 2022–2023	Succeeded by Anthony L. McQueen
New title	Director of Market Support Activities of the Defense Health Agency; 2023–2024	Vacant
