= Ronald Place =

U.S. Army general

Ronald J. Place
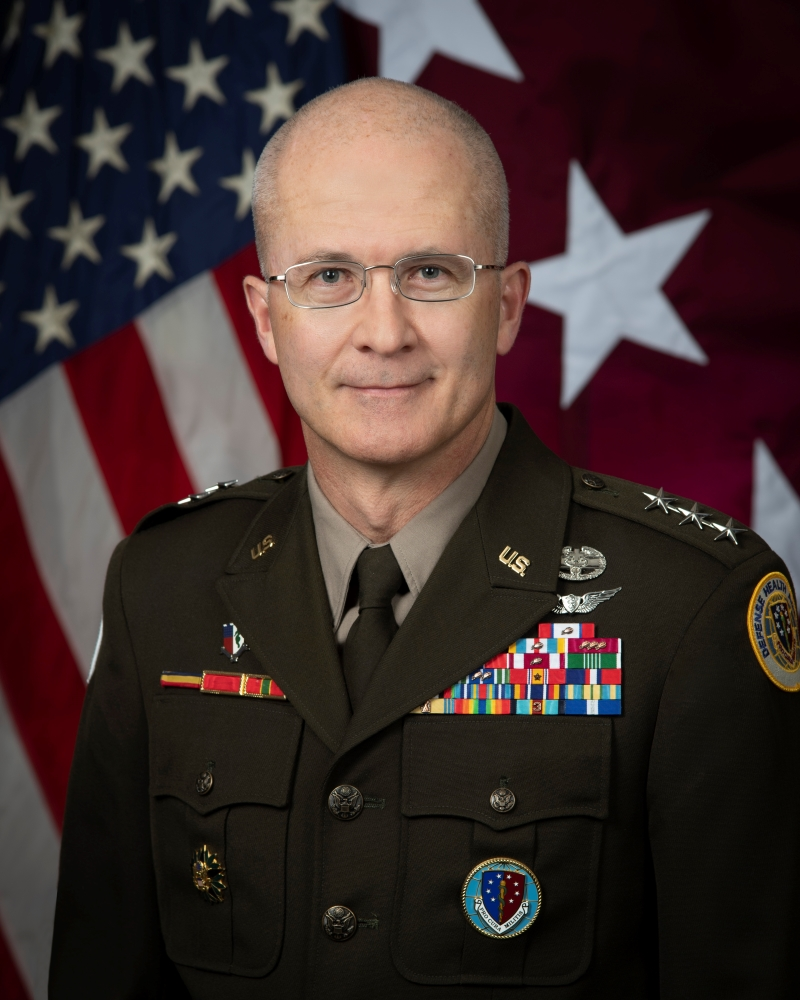
- Official portrait, 2022
- Military career
- Allegiance: United States
- Branch: United States Army
- Service years: 1986-2023
- Rank: Lieutenant General
- Commands: Defense Health Agency; Regional Health Command-Atlantic

Ronald J. Place is a retired United States Army lieutenant general who last served as the director of the Defense Health Agency. Previously, he was the director of the National Capital Medical Directorate of the Defense Health Agency. Raised in South Dakota, Place graduated from the University of South Dakota with a bachelor's degree in chemistry. He earned his medical degree from the Creighton University School of Medicine. His younger brother Major General Michael L. Place is also a military physician.

Place retired in July 2023 after 36 years of service.

== Biography ==
Ronald Place graduated from the University of South Dakota in 1986 with a bachelor's degree in chemistry, where he was elected to Phi Beta Kappa. He was then commissioned a second lieutenant in the United States Army through the ROTC program. After graduation, he completed medical school at Creighton University School of Medicine. He did his general surgery training at Madigan Army Medical Center, followed by a fellowship at the University of Texas Southwestern Medical School.

Place’s staff surgical assignments include Martin Army Community Hospital, Fort Benning, Georgia, and MAMC. His combat surgical experiences began in October 2001 when he deployed as a general surgeon with the 250th Forward Surgical Team (Airborne) to Afghanistan. He subsequently deployed with the 67th FST during OIF I, Task Force Med Falcon IX to Kosovo, and Detachment A, 249th General Hospital, under operational control of the 173rd Support Battalion, for OEF VI.

Place’s medical leadership positions began with his assignment to Landstuhl Regional Medical Center, Germany as the chief of surgery in 2002 and then deputy commander for outlying clinics. He returned to MAMC as the deputy commander, clinical services, then gaining responsibility for the day-to-day operations of the medical center as the principal deputy commander. He next served as commander of USA MEDDAC Fort Knox/Ireland Army Community Hospital, Kentucky, then USA MEDDAC Fort Stewart/Winn Army Community Hospital, Georgia. His flag officer positions include assistant surgeon general (force projection) at the Office of The Surgeon General, transitioning to the MEDCOM deputy chief of staff (quality and safety). After serving as the commanding general of Regional Health Command-Atlantic, Place led the Military Health System NDAA 2017 Program Management Office. He also served as the director of the National Capital Region Medical Directorate, the transitional Intermediate Management Organization, and the interim assistant director for Health Care Administration, all within the Defense Health Agency.

Place is a graduate of the AMEDD Officer Basic and Advanced Courses, the Command and General Staff Officer Course, and the National War College. He is board-certified in both general surgery and colorectal surgery, the author of more than 40 peer reviewed articles and book chapters and is a clinical professor of surgery at the Uniformed Services University of Health Sciences. His awards include the Defense Distinguished Service Medal, the Army Distinguished Service Medal with one oak leaf cluster, Defense Superior Service Medal, Legion of Merit with three oak leaf clusters, Bronze Star Medal with oak leaf cluster, Navy Presidential Unit Citation, Combat Action Badge, Combat Medic Badge, Flight Surgeon Badge, the Surgeon General’s “A” Designator for clinical excellence, the Order of Military Medical Merit, the Army Staff Identification Badge, and others.

Place retired in July 2023 after 36 years of service.

== In retirement ==
After his retirement, Place became the president and CEO for Avera McKennan Hospital and University Health Center in Sioux Falls, South Dakota.

Military offices
| Preceded by ??? | Commanding General of the Regional Health Command-Atlantic; 2015–2017 | Succeeded by R. Scott Dingle |
| Preceded by David Lane | Director of the National Capital Medical Directorate of the Defense Health Agency; 2017–2019 | Succeeded by Anita L. Fligge; Acting |
| Preceded by Raquel C. Bono | Director of the Defense Health Agency; 2019–2023 | Succeeded by Telita Crosland |
