= Defense Health Program Budget Activity Group =

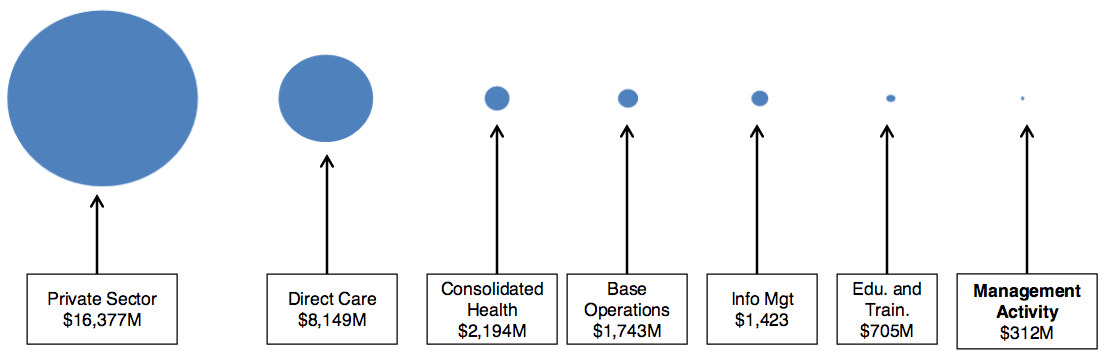
Military Health System Budget Activity Group Breakdown

Each year the United States Congress passes a Federal Budget detailing where federal tax money will be spent in the coming fiscal year. The budget is broken down into various Budget Activity Groups (BAG). Below is a breakdown of the Defense Health Program (DHP) Budget Activity Group.

The Defense Health Program (DHP) Operation and Maintenance (O&M) appropriation funding provides for worldwide medical and dental services to active forces and other eligible beneficiaries, veterinary services, occupational and industrial health care, specialized services for the training of medical personnel, and medical command headquarters. Included are costs associated with the delivery of the TRICARE benefit which provides for the health care of eligible active duty family members, retired members and their family members, and the eligible surviving family members of deceased active duty and retired members.

Budget Activity Groups
| Bag 1 | In-House Care |
| Bag 2 | Private Sector Care |
| Bag 3 | Consolidated Health Support |
| Bag 4 | Information Management |
| Bag 5 | Management Activities |
| Bag 6 | Education and Training |
| Bag 7 | Base Operations/Communications |
| Bag 8 | Facilities Sustainment, Restoration, Modernization and Demolition |

The Defense Health Program's series of Program Element Codes start with 08077. The Bag is the next number. For example, individual program element codes within Bag 1 include PE 0807711HP – Inpatient Care and PE 0807712HP – Outpatient Care.

== Other Resources ==
- 2012 MHS Stakeholders Report
- MHS brief to Institute of Medicine
