= Raquel C. Bono =

American physician and naval officer

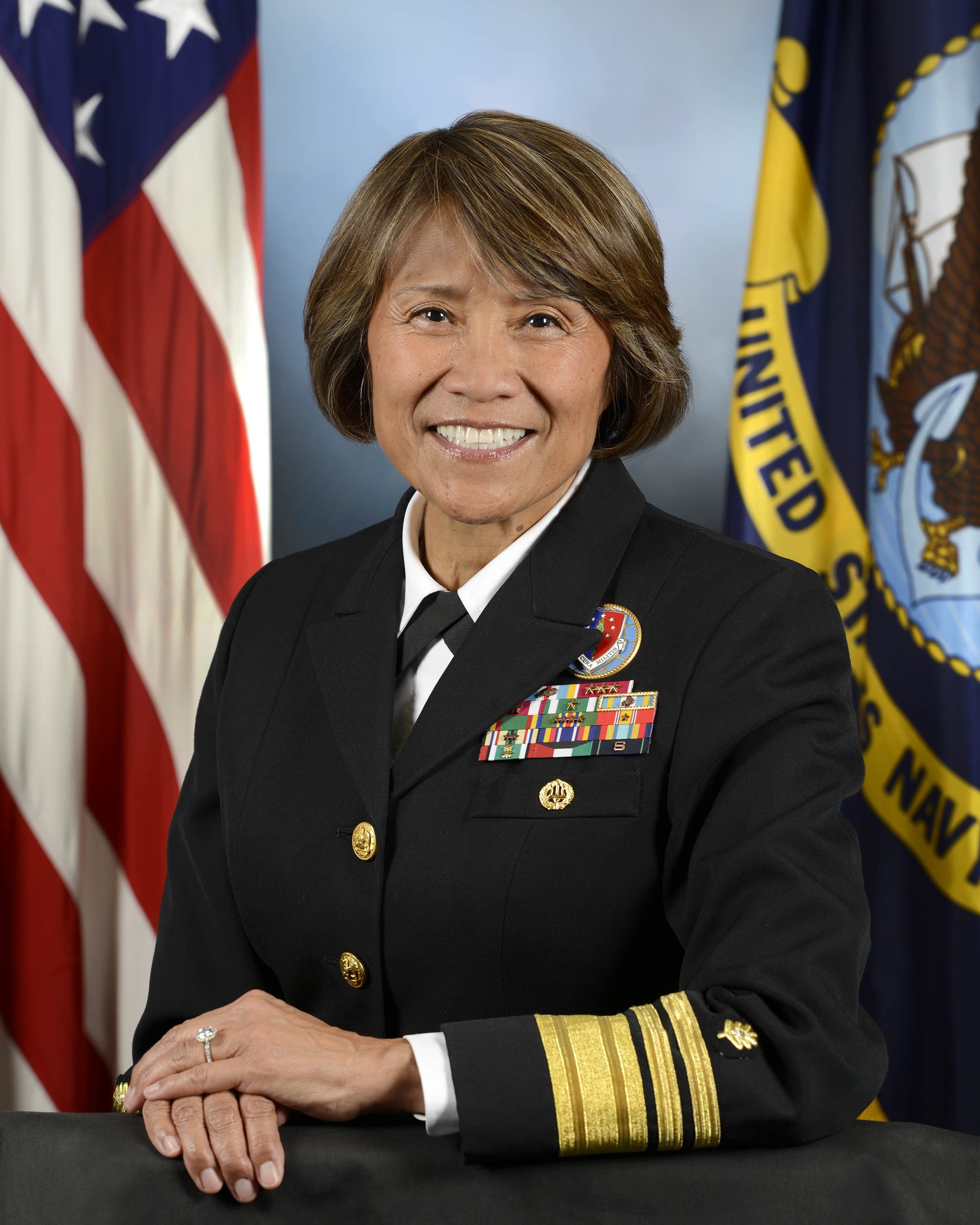
- Education: University of Texas at Austin
- Military career
- Branch: United States Navy
- Rank: Vice admiral (VADM)

Raquel Cruz Bono is a retired vice admiral in the United States Navy, and the former director of the Defense Health Agency. She is Chief Health Officer for Viking Cruises and a Senior Fellow for Johns Hopkins Applied Physics Laboratory.

== Medical education ==
Commissioned in June 1979, Bono obtained her baccalaureate degree from the University of Texas at Austin in psychology, where she also was a member of the swim team, and MD from the School of Medicine at the Texas Tech University Health Sciences Center. She completed a surgical internship and a General Surgery residency at Naval Medical Center Portsmouth, and a Trauma and Critical Care fellowship at the Eastern Virginia Graduate School of Medicine in Norfolk, Virginia.

== Navy ==
Shortly after training, Bono saw duty in Operations Desert Shield and Desert Storm as head, Casualty Receiving, Fleet Hospital Five in Saudi Arabia from August 1990 to March 1991. Upon returning, she was stationed at Naval Medical Center Portsmouth as a surgeon in the General Surgery department; surgical intensivist in the Medical/Surgical Intensive Care Unit, and attending surgeon at the Burn Trauma Unit at Sentara Norfolk General Hospital. Her various appointed duties included division head of Trauma; head of the Ambulatory Procedures Department (APD); chair of the Laboratory Animal Care and Use Committee; assistant head of the Clinical Investigations and Research department; chair of the Medical Records Committee, and Command Intern Coordinator. She has also been as the Specialty Leader for Intern Matters to the Surgeon General of the Navy.

In September 1999, she was assigned as the director of Restorative Care at the National Naval Medical Center in Bethesda, Maryland, followed by assignment to the Bureau of Medicine and Surgery from September 2001 to December 2002 as the medical corps career planning officer for the Chief of the Medical Corps. She returned to the National Naval Medical Center in January 2003 as director for Medical–Surgical Services.

From August 2004 through August 2005 she was the executive assistant to the 35th Navy Surgeon General of the Navy and Chief, Bureau of Medicine and Surgery. Following that, she reported to Naval Hospital Jacksonville, Florida, as the commanding officer from August 2005 to August 2008. In September 2008, she became the chief of staff, deputy director Tricare Management Activity (TMA) of the Office of the Assistant Secretary of Defense, Health Affairs (OASD(HA)). She reported as deputy director, Medical Resources, Plans and Policy (N093), Chief of Naval Operations in June 2010.

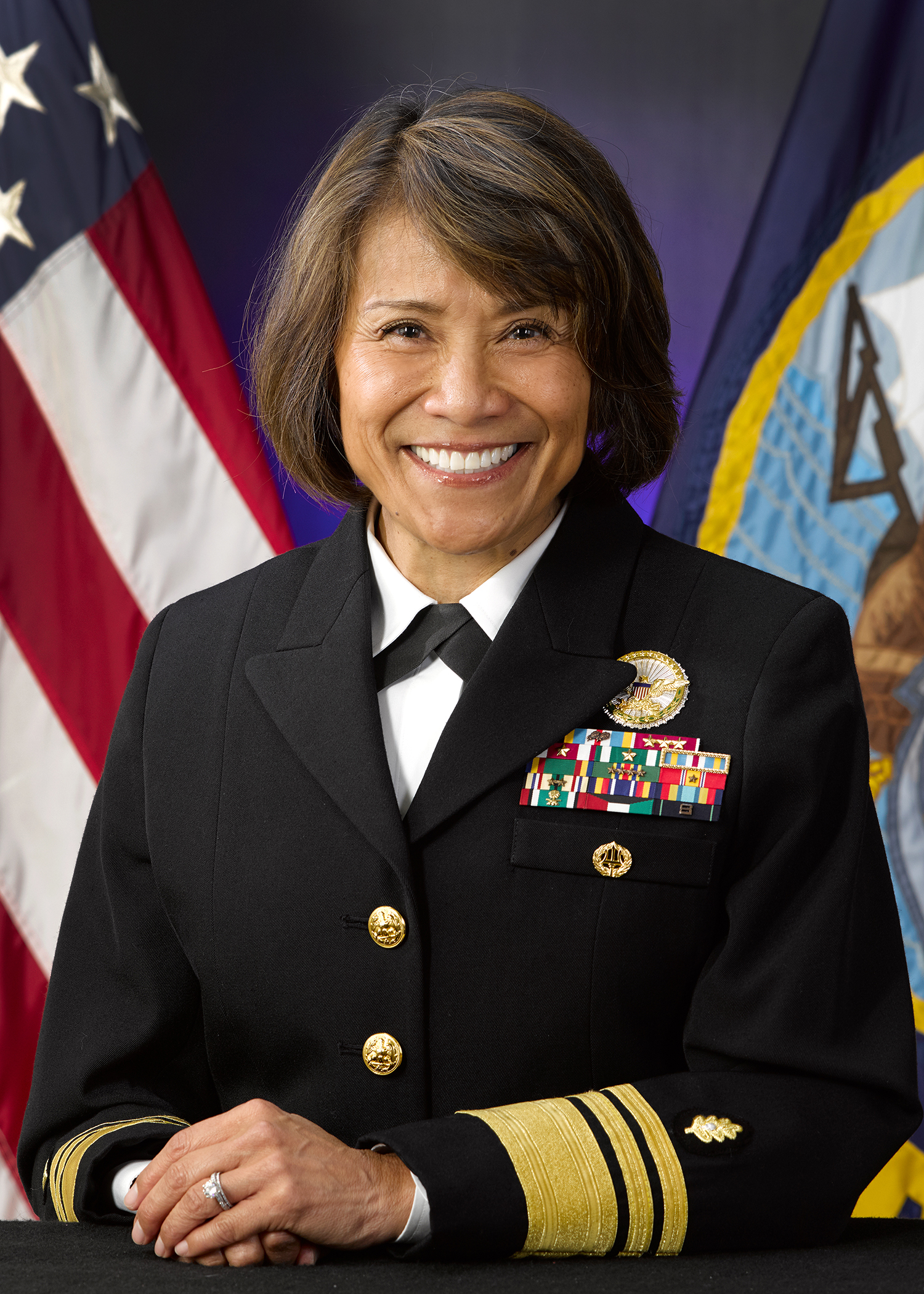
Vice Admiral Raquel C. Bono in 2018

In addition to being a Diplomate of the American Board of Surgery, Bono is a Fellow of the American College of Surgeons and a member of the Eastern Association for the Surgery of Trauma. Her personal decorations include a Defense Superior Service Medal, three Legion of Merit Medals, two Meritorious Service Medals, and two Navy and Marine Corps Commendation Medals.

On March 22, 2020, Bono was named by Washington State Governor Jay Inslee to lead the state health system's response to the 2020 coronavirus pandemic.
