= Combat support agency =

DoD agencies that provide tactical support to the US military during combat operations

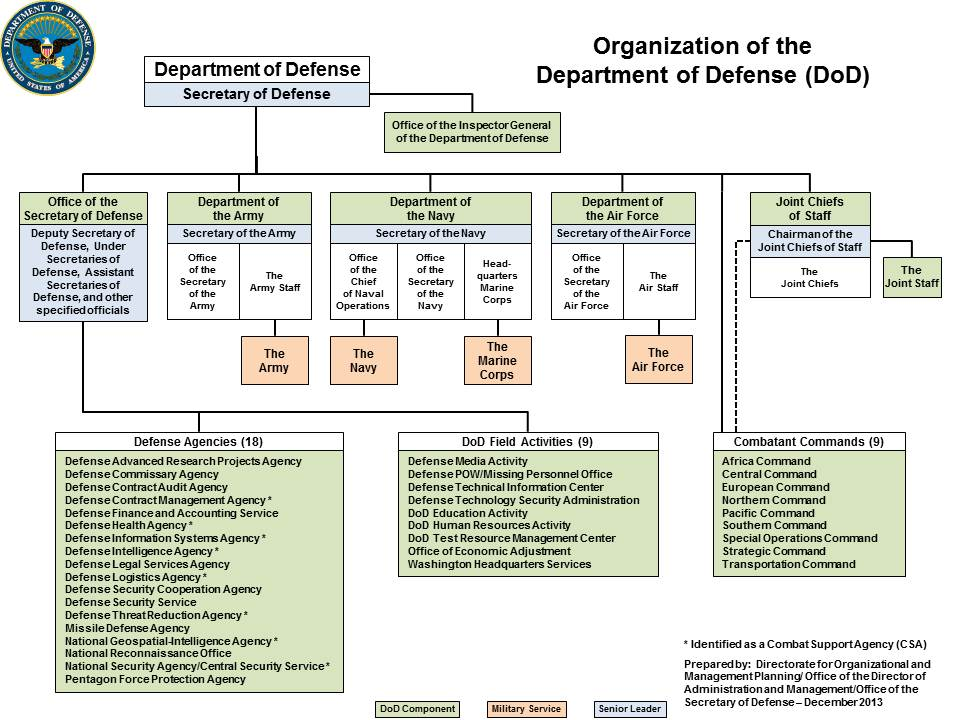
DoD organization, including CSA designations.

Combat support agency (CSA) is a designation by the United States Department of Defense (DoD) of those defense agencies that provide department-level and tactical support to the U.S. military during combat operations. The designation was first outlined by the Goldwater-Nichols Department of Defense Reorganization Act of 1986, with subsequent additions based on the department's needs.

== Combat support agencies ==
There are currently eight agencies designated as CSAs. This includes several intelligence agencies under the DoD, which have a national mandate in addition to their departmental combat support role.

- Defense Contract Management Agency (DCMA)
- Defense Health Agency (DHA)
- Defense Information Systems Agency (DISA)
- Defense Intelligence Agency (DIA)
- Defense Logistics Agency (DLA)
- Defense Threat Reduction Agency (DTRA)
- National Geospatial-Intelligence Agency (NGA)
- National Security Agency / Central Security Service (NSA/CSS)

== See also ==
- Fourth Estate (Department of Defense), another group of agencies with some overlap including DCMA, DHA, DISA, and DLA
