= Telita Crosland =

U.S. Army general

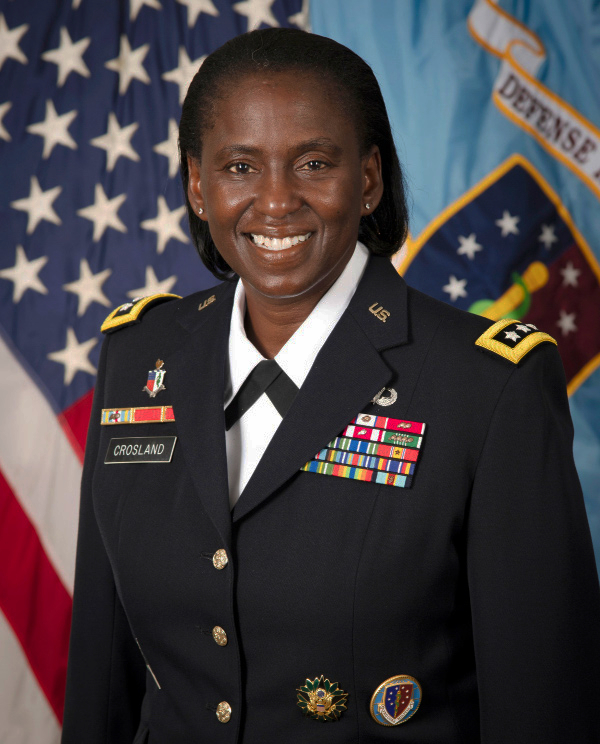
- Official portrait, 2023
- Born: Brooklyn, New York, U.S.
- Military career
- Allegiance: United States
- Branch: United States Army
- Service years: 1985–2025
- Rank: Lieutenant General
- Commands: Defense Health Agency; Regional Health Command Atlantic; U.S. Army Medical Department Activity; U.S. Army Health Clinic Grafenwoehr
- Awards: Army Distinguished Service Medal; Legion of Merit (3)
- Telita Crosland's voice Crosland's opening statement at a Senate Appropriations Defense Subcommittee hearing on military health programs Recorded 7 March 2023

Telita Crosland is a retired United States Army lieutenant general who served as director of the Defense Health Agency from 3 January 2023 to 28 February 2025. She previously served as deputy surgeon general of the United States Army.

== Education ==
Crosland was born in Brooklyn, New York. In 1989, she graduated from the United States Military Academy. She holds an MD degree and an MPH degree.

== Military career ==
In May 2022, Crosland was nominated for promotion to lieutenant general and assignment as director of the Defense Health Agency. Her nomination was confirmed by the Senate on 29 September 2022. Crosland resigned from her assignment as director on 28 February 2025.

Military offices
| Preceded by R. Scott Dingle | Deputy Chief of Staff for Operations of the United States Army Medical Command; 2017–2018 | Succeeded by Erik H. Torring III |
| Preceded by R. Scott Dingle | Commanding General of Regional Health Command—Atlantic; 2018–2019 | Succeeded by Michael L. Place |
| Preceded by R. Scott Dingle | Deputy Commanding General (Operations) of the United States Army Medical Command; 2019–2021 | Succeeded by Michael J. Talley |
| Preceded by R. Scott Dingle | Deputy Surgeon General of the United States Army; 2019–2022 | Succeeded by George Appenzeller |
| Preceded by Ronald J. Place | Director of the Defense Health Agency; 2023–2025 | Succeeded by David J. Smith; Acting |
