= 31st Medical Group =

- Distinctive Unit Insignia
- Country: United States
- Branch: United States Army
- Garrison/HQ: Wurzburg; Darmstadt
- Motto: Our to Save

The 31st Medical Group was a US Army medical group, which provided echelon III medical support. Originally organized as the 31st Medical Regiment, the group fought in World War II Europe, and then spent much of the next fifty years providing support to the Seventh Army, primarily to the VII Corps.

== Lineage and Honors ==
=== Lineage ===
- Constituted 1 October 1933 as the 31st Medical Regiment and allotted to the Regular Army
- Organized sometime before September 1934
- Inactivated 5 June 1936 at Boston, Massachusetts
- Organized 16 December 1936 at Syracuse, New York
- Inactivated 17 September 1941 at Syracuse, New York
- Activated 15 July 1942 at Camp Barkeley, Texas
- Headquarters and Headquarters and Service Company reorganized and redesignated as Headquarters and Headquarters Detachment, 31st Medical Group, 10 September 1943 (other elements of the regiment, hereafter separate lineages)
- Inactivated
- Activated 15 August 1951 in Germany
- Inactivated 16 April 1975

=== Honors ===
==== Campaign Participation Credit ====
- World War II
  - Normandy
  - Northern France
  - Rhineland
  - Central Europe

==== Decorations ====
- None

== Distinctive Unit Insignia ==
Distinctive Unit Insignia, 31st Medical Group

=== Description ===
A Silver color metal and enamel device 1 1/32 inches (2.62 cm) in height overall consisting of a shield blazoned: Sanguine, a bend Argent. Attached below the shield a Maroon scroll inscribed OURS TO SAVE in Silver letters

=== Symbolism ===
The shield is maroon with the bend white in the colors of the Medical Department

=== Background ===
The distinctive unit insignia was originally approved for the 31st Medical Regiment on 4 March 1941. It was redesignated for the 31st Medical Group on 18 July 1966.

== History ==
The 31st Medical Regiment was constituted in the Regular Army on 1 October 1933, allotted to the I Corps Area, and assigned to the First Army. The regiment was organized sometime before September 1934 with Organized Reserve personnel as a "Regular Army, Inactive (RAI) unit with its headquarters at Boston, Massachusetts. The regiment was withdrawn from the I Corps Area on 5 June 1936, moved to an inactive status, and allotted to the II Corps Area.

The regiment was again organized on 16 December 1936 with Organized Reserve personnel as an RAI unit with its headquarters at Syracuse, New York by transfer of personnel from the 362d Medical Regiment. The 31st Medical Regiment conducted summer training most summers at Carlisle Barracks, Pennsylvania with the 1st Medical Regiment, but in 1940 it spent its summer training processing personnel for Citizens' Military Training Camp training at Fort Dix, New Jersey.

The regiment's mobilization station was Fort George G. Meade, Maryland.

The regiment was inactivated on 17 September 1941 when its reserve personnel were reassigned to other units.

=== World War II ===
Initial elements of the 31st Medical Group began flowing onto Utah Beach on D+2, 8 June 1944, and the group headquarters detachment landed on D+12, 18 June 1944, where it provided command and control for medical units of the First Army in support of the V Corps, as in World War II, echelon III/role III health service support was provided by the field army, and corps serves as tactical headquarters only.

The 31st Medical group was assigned to the Ninth United States Army once that army became operational in France. There, it served alongside the 1st, 30th, and 64th Medical Groups in providing Echelon III support to the soldiers of the Ninth Army. There, the groups supported the Ninth Army in its drive through the Rhine and Ruhr valleys, through the Battle of the Bulge, and the advance to the Elbe river.

=== Cold War ===
31st Medical Group staff on Operation Winter Shield, 1964

The 31st Medical Group was reactivated in Germany on 15 August 1951.

In 1965, as part of a redesign of how field armies provided logistics support, a functional support command was established under the Seventh Army, and under it, the 7th Medical Brigade was activated on 21 June 1965. The 30th, 31st, and 62nd Medical Groups were all attached to the brigade, as well as a medical depot and the 421st Medical Company (Air Ambulance). The 30th and 31st Medical Groups were arrayed east of the Rhine River ins support of the two U.S. corps, and the 62nd Medical Group--until its return to the United States as part of Operation REFORGER in 1968--was responsible for the area to the west of the Rhine.

With the inactivation of the 7th Medical Brigade on 21 July 1973, the 30th and 31st Medical Groups became direct reporting units to the 7th Medical Command.

The 31st Medical Group was inactivated on 16 April 1975.

== Commanders ==
Image	Rank	Name	Branch	Begin date	End date	Notes
		Unknown		January 1934	5 June 1936	
		Inactive		6 June 1936	15 December 1936	
	Captain	Milton J. Daus	MC	16 December 1936	10 June 1937	
	Lieutenant Colonel	Raeburn J. Wharton	MC	10 June 1937	28 July 1937	
	Captain	Preston W. Parts	MC	28 July 1937	9 February 1938	
	Major	James H. Van Marter	MC	9 February 1938	18 December 1940	
	Captain	Harold A. Pooler	MC	18 December 1940	7 September 1941	
		Inactive		8 September 1941	14 July 1942	
	Colonel					
	Colonel					
	Colonel					
	Colonel					
	Colonel	Robert M. Hall	MC		October 1962	
	Colonel	Edwin Stow Chapman	MC	October 1962	October 1963	
	Lieutenant Colonel	David J. Edwards	MC	October 1963		Commanded the 68th Medical Group in Vietnam from 8 September 1969 to 4 August 1970
	Colonel					
	Colonel	Joseph J. Bellas	MC		July 1968	Bellas assumed command of the U.S. Army Hospital, Bad Kreuznach
	Lieutenant Colonel	Jack Benson	MC	July 1967		Benson had been the division surgeon of the 3rd Infantry Division
	Colonel					
	Colonel					
	Colonel	William P. Winkler, Jr.	MC	June 1971	May 1972	Following command, Winkler served as Chief of Professional Services at the 130th Station Hospital in Heidelberg and the Commander of the 279th Station Hospital in Berlin before returning to the US in July 1975. He retired as a Major General in 1988 while serving as Deputy Assistant Secretary for Health Affairs.

== Organization ==
=== 30 June 1958 ===
- HHD, 31st Medical Group, Darmstadt
- 2nd Evacuation Hospital (Semi-mobile), Bad Kreuznach
- 5th Surg Hosp (Mobile) (Army), Heidelberg
- 7th Evacuation Hospital (Semi-mobile), Darmstadt
- 31st Surg Hospital (Mobile) (Army), Höchst
- 547th Medical Company (Clearing), Höchst
- 32nd Surg Hospital (Mobile) (Army), Würzburg
- HHD, 34th Medical Battalion, Wertheim
  - 95th Medical Company (Ambulance), Wertheim
  - 557th Medical Company (Ambulance), Wertheim
  - 655th Medical Company (Ambulance), Wertheim
  - 53rd Medical Detachment (Helicopter Ambulance), Darmstadt
- 58th Evacuation Hospital (Semi-mobile), Idar Oberstein

=== March 1961 ===
- HHD, 31st Medical Group, Darmstadt
- 7th Evacuation Hospital (Semi-mobile), Darmstadt
- 31st Surgical Hospital (Mobile) (Army), Hoechst
- 32nd Surgical Hospital (Mobile) (Army), Wurzburg
- 53rd Medical Detachment (Helicopter Ambulance), Darmstadt (Griesheim Airfield)
- 547th Medical Company (Clearing), Hoechst
- 29th Army Postal Unit, Darmstadt
- HHD, 34th Medical Battalion, Wertheim
  - 52d Medical Detachment (Helicopter Ambulance), Wertheim
  - 95th Medical Company (Ambulance), Wertheim
  - 377th Medical Company
  - 557th Medical Company (Ambulance), Wertheim
  - 655th Medical Company (Ambulance), Wertheim
