= Defense Finance and Accounting Service =

Agency of the United States Department of Defense

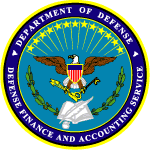
- Official seal

- Official logo

Agency overview
- Formed: 1991
- Headquarters: Indianapolis, Indiana
- Employees: >12,000
- Agency executives: Audrey Davis, Director; Jonathan Witter, Principal Deputy Director; ~ Aaron Gillison, Deputy Director, Operations; Deputy Director, Strategy and Support
- Parent department: Department of Defense
- Website: www.dfas.mil

The Defense Finance and Accounting Service (DFAS) is an agency of the United States Department of Defense (DOD), headquartered in Indianapolis, Indiana. The DFAS was established in 1991 under the authority, direction, and control of the Under Secretary of Defense (Comptroller)/Chief Financial Officer to strengthen and reduce costs of financial management and operations within the DOD. The DFAS is responsible for all payments to servicemembers, employees, vendors, and contractors. It provides business intelligence and finance and accounting information to DOD decisionmakers. The DFAS is also responsible for preparing annual financial statements and the consolidation, standardization, and modernization of finance and accounting requirements, functions, processes, operations, and systems for the DOD.

One of the most visible responsibilities of the DFAS is handling military pay. The DFAS pays all DoD military and civilian personnel, retirees and annuitants, as well as major DoD contractors and vendors. The DFAS also supports customers outside the DoD in support of electronic government initiatives. Customers include the Executive Office of the President, Department of Energy, Department of Veterans Affairs, Department of Health & Human Services, Department of State, U.S. Agency for Global Media and Foreign partners.

The DFAS is a working capital fund agency financed by reimbursement of operating costs from its governmental customers (mostly the military service departments) rather than through direct appropriations. The DFAS remains the world's largest finance and accounting operation.

In FY 2019, the DFAS:

- Processed 140.8 million pay transactions (~6.5 million people/accounts)
- Made 6.2 million travel payments
- Paid 15.1 million commercial invoices
- Maintained 98 million General Ledger accounts
- Managed $1.17 trillion in Military Retirement and Health Benefits Funds
- Made $558 billion in disbursements
- Managed $616.6 billion in Foreign Military Sales (reimbursed by foreign governments)
- Accounted for 1,349 active DoD appropriations

== History ==
Prior to 1990, each of the three military departments (Department of the Army, Department of the Navy, and Department of the Air Force) and the other major governmental agencies developed and implemented their own accounting, budgeting, and financial management systems. This freedom of operation lead to numerous specialized systems that were incapable of communicating with one another. In 1990, there were 878 independent finance and accounting systems maintained within Federal Government Agencies.

In 1991, Secretary of Defense Dick Cheney created the Defense Finance and Accounting Service to reduce the cost of Defense Department finance and accounting operations and to strengthen financial management through consolidation of finance and accounting activities across the department. Since its inception, the DFAS has consolidated more than 300 installation-level finance and accounting offices into 10 sites, and reduced the work force from about 27,000 to about 13,000 personnel.

In 2003, the DFAS was selected by the Office of Personnel Management to be one of four governmental entities to provide payroll services for the U.S. government. In 2004, Nielsen Norman Group named the Defense Finance and Accounting Service's portal (ePortal) among the 10 best government intranets in the world. Experts at the Nielsen reviewed hundreds of intranets before naming the top ten which shared traits like good usability and organization, performance metrics and incremental improvements.

The 2005 round of Base Realignment and Closure cuts required the DFAS to be completely restructured. Many sites were integrated into major centers. Since its inception, the agency has consolidated more than 300 installation-level offices into nine DFAS sites and reduced the number of systems in use from 330 to 111. As a result of BRAC efforts begun in FY 2006, the DFAS has closed 20 sites, realigned headquarters from Arlington to Indianapolis and established a liaison location in Alexandria, Virginia.

=== Establishing legislation ===
The Chief Financial Officers Act of 1990 (31 USC 501, Pub. L. 101–576, title I, §101, Nov. 15, 1990, 104 Stat. 2838) and 10 USC 113, laid the groundwork for the Secretary of Defense to establish a more streamlined federal financial management structure. In late 1990, under the guidelines of the Department of Defense Directive (DoDD) 5118.5, the establishment of DFAS was announced in the Federal Register (55 FR 50179 (1990)). These guidelines were later codified in the Code of Federal Regulations in (32 CFR Part 352a).

=== Related agencies ===
The United States Department of Defense is the parent agency of DFAS. Defense Finance and Accounting Service Garnishment Operations Center and the Defense Finance and Accounting Service Out-of-Service Debt Management Center are subordinate agencies of DFAS.

=== Major events in the history of the agency ===
- 1991: DFAS founded
- 1992: Began consolidation of 300 field sites into 26 DFAS centers
- 1994: Began paying all DoD civilian employees; established centralized disbursing
- 1995: DoD establishes DFAS as a Fourth Estate Human Resources Regional Service Center
- 1998: Consolidated military pay operations into one system
- 2000: First unmodified financial statement audit opinion
- 2002: Received first unmodified audit opinion for Defense Commissary Agency and Defense Contract Audit Agency
- 2005: Base Realignment and Closure realigns DFAS into 10 sites
- 2006: Initiated Wounded-in-Action program providing real-time financial support to wounded service members
- 2007: Wounded Warrior Family Support Debit Card Program implemented providing funds to families of wounded warfighters
- 2010: Created Audit Readiness Directorate
- 2013: Achieved unmodified opinions on Statement on Standards for Attestation Engagement No. 16 for Civilian Pay, Military Pay, and Disbursing
- 2016: Achieved the 17th unmodified audit opinion for DFAS WCF Financial Statements

== Major laws associated with and/or enforced by agency ==
The DFAS must "establish and enforce requirements, principles, standards, systems, procedures, and practices necessary to comply with finance and accounting statutory and regulatory requirements applicable to the Department of Defense." The DFAS responsibilities and authorities are outlined in DoD 7000.14-R, "DoD Financial Management Regulation (DoD FMR)."

== Controversies ==
=== Unsubstantiated Change Actions ===
A 2013 Reuters investigation concluded that DFAS implements monthly "unsubstantiated change actions"—illegal, inaccurate "plugs"—that forcibly make DOD's books match Treasury's books. Reuters concluded:

Fudging the accounts with false entries is standard operating procedure... Reuters has found that the Pentagon is largely incapable of keeping track of its vast stores of weapons, ammunition and other supplies; thus it continues to spend money on new supplies it doesn't need and on storing others long out of date. It has amassed a backlog of more than half a trillion dollars... [H]ow much of that money paid for actual goods and services delivered isn't known.

=== Audit ===
In 1990, the U.S. Congress passed the Chief Financial Officers Act, which directed all federal departments and agencies to submit to annual audits.

The DFAS is the lead Department of Defense unit in charge of auditing the U.S. military.

Before the audit kicked off, the Pentagon spent tens of billions of dollars to upgrade its technology in preparation for the audit. Many of the new systems failed, however, as they were "either unable to perform all the jobs they were meant to do or scrapped altogether—only adding to the waste they were meant to stop," according to Reuters.

According to contract announcements, substantial audit activity took place during fiscal years 2016–2018, with the DOD's first comprehensive audit concluding at the end of fiscal year 2018. Corporate accounting firms conducted the audit on behalf of the DFAS, with Ernst & Young, Kearney & Co., KPMG, and PwC prominent among them. Other firms, such as Cotton & Co., Deloitte, and Grant Thornton, provided audit readiness and financial improvement.

According to the Pentagon, the DOD's first audit covered $2.7 trillion in assets and $2.6 trillion in liabilities.

The DOD did not pass this first audit. Five of the twenty-one units received a passing grade (an 'unmodified opinion'), but the rest of the units failed. David Norquist, the Pentagon's comptroller, estimated that this first audit cost close to $1 billion: $367 million for military infrastructure to support the audits and for the corporations conducting the audit, and $551 million to fix the problems identified in the audit.

Investigative journalist Dave Lindorff described the situation: the accounting firms eventually concluded that the department's "financial records were riddled with so many bookkeeping deficiencies, irregularities, and errors that a reliable audit was simply impossible."

Deputy Secretary of Defense Patrick Shanahan asserted, "We failed the audit, but we never expected to pass it."

After the first audit was over, the DOD continued purchasing audit services from accounting firms, including from Ernst & Young, Kearney & Co., and KPMG. A few months after this audit, David Norquist—the man who, as the Pentagon's comptroller, oversaw the entire audit process—got promoted to Acting Deputy Secretary of Defense. Norquist is a former partner of Kearney & Co., one of the firms that conducted the audit.

In January 2019, the U.S. Air Force contracted Diligent Consulting (San Antonio, TX) to realign "the fielding strategy to match the needs of individual units" and "incorporate two financial processes necessary to be compliant with Financial Improvement and Audit Readiness and the Federal Information System Controls Audit Manual."

The DOD failed its second audit, though DOD officials insisted "progress" was being made.

The DOD failed its third audit, with DOD officials urging patience, asserting that DOD will likely pass its audit sometime around the year 2027.

As of fiscal year 2022, the DOD has still not passed its audit.

== Locations ==
- Current locations:
  - Major Sites
    - Indianapolis, Indiana (Headquarters) – DFAS is headquartered in the MG Emmett J. Bean Federal Center, a 1,600,000-square-foot (150,000 m^{2}) building that was part of Fort Benjamin Harrison. A solar panel system was installed on the roof of the building in 2010, allowing the building to generate 1.8-MW. Prior to housing DFAS, this location was known as the Finance Center, U.S. Army (1953–1972); U.S. Army Finance Support Agency (1972–1974); U.S. Army Finance and Accounting Center (1975–1991).
    - Cleveland, Ohio
    - Columbus, Ohio
    - Limestone, Maine
    - Rome, New York
      - Europe
      - Japan
  - Smaller scaled back sites
    - Alexandria, Virginia
    - Texarkana, Texas
    - Bratenahl, Ohio
- Closed sites:
  - Patuxent River, Maryland
  - Charleston, South Carolina
  - Dayton, Ohio
  - Denver, Colorado - Lowry Air Force Base
  - Kansas City, Missouri - Richards-Gebaur Air Force Base
  - Lawton, Oklahoma
  - Lexington, Kentucky
  - Norfolk, Virginia
  - Omaha, Nebraska
  - Oakland, California
  - Orlando, Florida - Naval Training Center Orlando
  - Honolulu, Hawaii
    - Pacific
  - Pensacola, Florida
  - Rock Island, Illinois
  - St. Louis, Missouri
  - San Antonio, Texas
  - San Bernardino, California - Norton Air Force Base
  - San Diego, California
  - Seaside, California

== See also ==
- Air Reserve Personnel Center, Denver, CO, former Lowry AFB
