= National Military Family Association =

U.S. non-profit organization

- Formation: 1969
- Type: 501(c)(3) nonprofit organization
- Headquarters: Alexandria, Virginia
- Website: https://www.militaryfamily.org/

The National Military Family Association (NMFA), headquartered in Alexandria, Virginia, is a private non-profit association on a mission to stand up for, support, and enhance the quality of life for every military family through bold advocacy, innovative programming, and dynamic and responsive solutions.

== History ==
Founded in 1969 as the Military Wives Association by a group of military spouses who were seeking financial security for their friends who were widowed after their service member's death. From their efforts, the Survivor Benefit Plan came into being. Over the last 50 years, NMFA has been the voice of America's military families, championing for improvements to their quality of life and earned benefits. NMFA is the "go to" source for Administration officials, Members of Congress, and key decision makers when they want to understand the issues facing America's military families. The name of the organization was changed to the National Military Family Association in 1984 to reflect the broad scope of its involvement. NMFA is a non-profit 501(c)(3).

== Membership and organization ==
NMFA has members from all ranks of the seven uniformed services worldwide, along with their family members, civilian supporters, and more. Its Board of Governors, which includes active duty service members, reserve component, retirees, and spouses, provides oversight of governance, finances, and strategic vision of the Association. Governors receive no financial compensation, contributes financially, participates on standing committees, and connects the organization with individuals, charities, and companies that can help NMFA forward its mission, The Association's Volunteer Corps consists of hundreds of individuals who assist in NMFA's advocacy work and improve NMFA's programs. NMFA is also supported by distinguished Board of Advisors, and receives significant support at the top levels of the Services. The Association works on common concerns with The Military Coalition, an umbrella organization of 36 military-related associations, and regularly testifies before House and Senate Armed Service Committees to provide a boots-on-the-ground perspective and recommendations to our nation's lawmakers on Capitol Hill. NMFA works closely with the Department of Defense and companies contracted to provide services, such as healthcare, to military families.

The NMFA CEO is Besa Pinchotti, a military spouse. The director of outreach and chief impact officer is Raleigh Duttweiler, who is a mother of three and a military spouse.

== Programs and advocacy ==
NMFA provides military spouse scholarships, camps for military kids, retreats for families reconnecting after deployment and for the families of the wounded, ill, or injured. NMFA aims to strengthen the families of the currently serving, veterans, retired, wounded or fallen members of the Army, Marine Corps, Navy, Air Force, Space Force, Coast Guard, Public Health Service, and National Oceanic and Atmospheric Association.

Its Operation Purple Program is designed to address the physical and psychological wellbeing of children and families from all military statuses and branches, including wounded, ill, injured, and medically retired service members. The program brings together children and families dealing with injury, deployment, or other stressors of military life in outdoor environments that help foster communication and connection through the holistic healing properties only nature can provide.

At Operation Purple Camp, over 1,600 military kids per year will connect with peers who have dealt with many of the same things, like frequent moves, a deployed parent, and sometimes a parent's injury. At camp, kids enjoy kayaking, zip lining, horseback riding, and service activities where they give back to the community.

Operation Purple Family Retreats help families reunite and reintegrate after deployments. Families can unplug and relax and also attend organized activities to help strengthen and renew their relationships. With an average of 300 family applicants each year, and the ability to serve only a quarter of these families, Family Retreats remain paramount to NMFA and to the nation's military families.

NMFA's Operation Purple Healing Adventures are family retreats designed specifically to help families of wounded, ill, or injured service members. These long-weekend experiences help families adjust to their "new normal," and rediscover family-fun and togetherness. With an average of 150 applications and the ability to serve only a fourth of these families, Healing Adventures continue to be vital to our mission and the nation's wounded, ill, or injured families.

The Military Spouse Scholarship Program gives funding to spouses of service members pursuing career and education goals. Because of common setbacks caused by frequent military moves and underemployment, these scholarships help spouses achieve their goals and provide their family with financial stability, especially helpful if a service member is injured.

NMFA's Child Care Fee Relief Program, which launched in 2020 in response to the long-standing issue military families face accessing quality child care, provides reimbursements to military families who use child care to attend school or work full time.

Members of the Association's Government Relations department study issues, testify before Congressional committees, work with Congressional staff, and represent NMFA on advisory groups for many Department of Defense agencies, to include the Defense Commissary Agency Patron Council and the TRICARE Beneficiary Panel.

Since its inception in 1969, the effectiveness of NMFA is reflected in accomplishments in most of the issue areas in which the Association works. These include medical and dental benefits, dependent education, retiree and survivor benefits, relocation, and spouse employment. NMFA staff speaks regularly to all types of groups, including family service organizations, commanders conferences, and officer and enlisted spouse clubs.

In 2004, it published an analysis of military family support, entitled Serving the Homefront: An Analysis of Military Family Support Since September 11, 2001.

In 2008, NMFA and the US Family Health Plan were awarded an Emmy Award from the National Academy of Television Arts & Sciences for a public service announcement series, "Now is Our Time to Serve."

Its website provides extensive information for military families and those who honor and support them. Its membership remains open to the public and operates solely on donations from individuals and sponsorships and partnerships from companies, businesses, and beyond. It does not accept funding from government or lobbying agencies.
