= Stanley Scott (reporter) =

American journalist

Stanley S. Scott (died 1992) was a reporter, public official, and businessman in the United States. He witnessed the assassination of Malcolm X in 1965 and was nominated for a Pulitzer Prize for the story he wrote about it.

His family established the Atlanta Daily World. He graduated from Lincoln University and served in the U.S. Army. He attended Industrial High School in Bolivar, Tennessee.

He worked for the NAACP. He served in the Richard Nixon and Gerald Ford administrations.

He had a daughter and two sons. George H. W. Bush spoke at a tribute dinner held in Scott's honor in September 11, 1991. A cancer center at LSU is named for him.

== See also ==
- Lynn Norment
