= Defense Health Agency =

Combat support agency of the U.S. Department of Defense

- Logo
- Active: October 1, 2013
- Part of: Military Health System
- Garrison/HQ: Falls Church, Virginia
- Website: Official website

Commanders
- Director: VADM Darin K. Via, USN

Insignia
- Seal

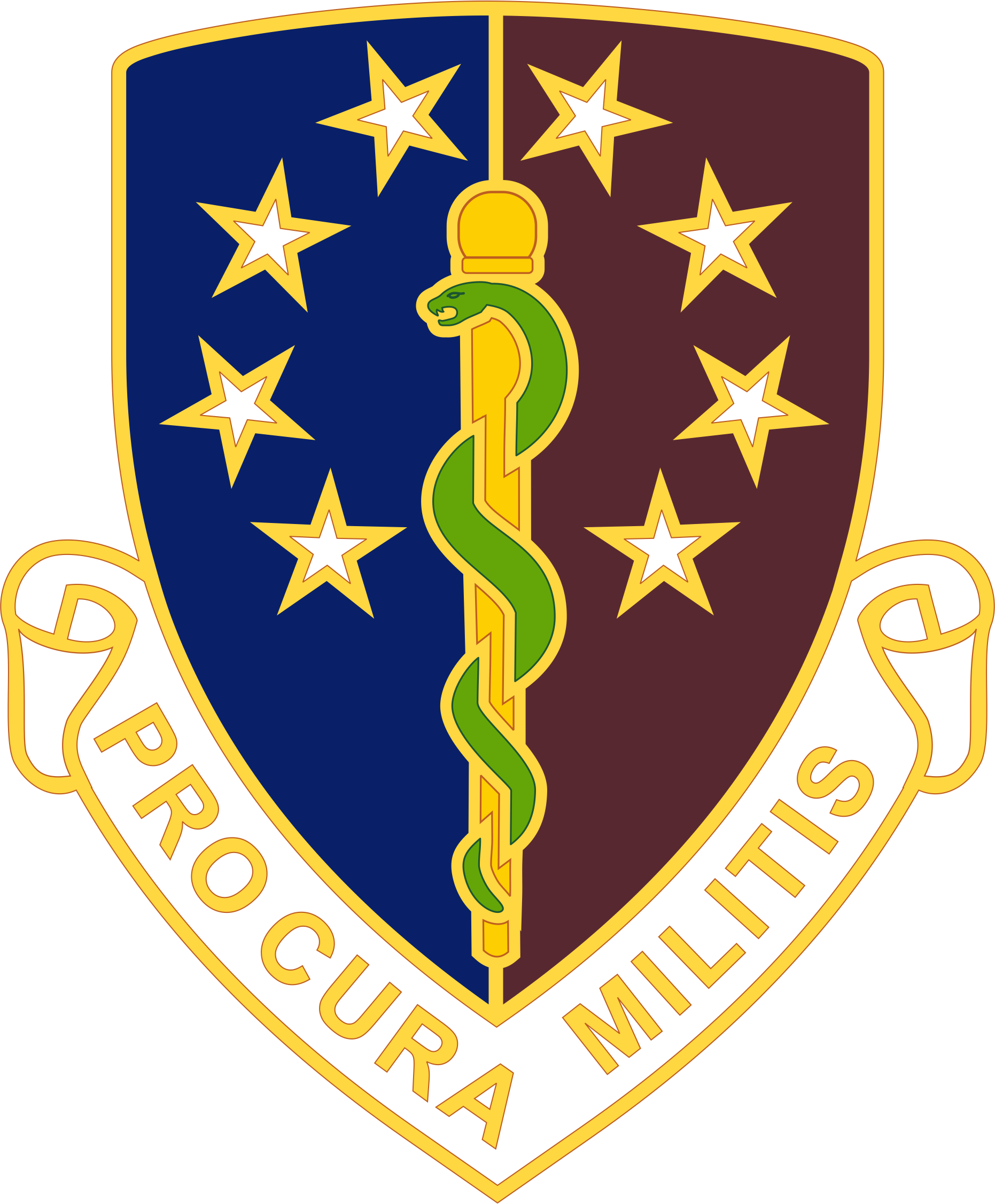
- Distinctive unit insignia worn by U.S. Army element

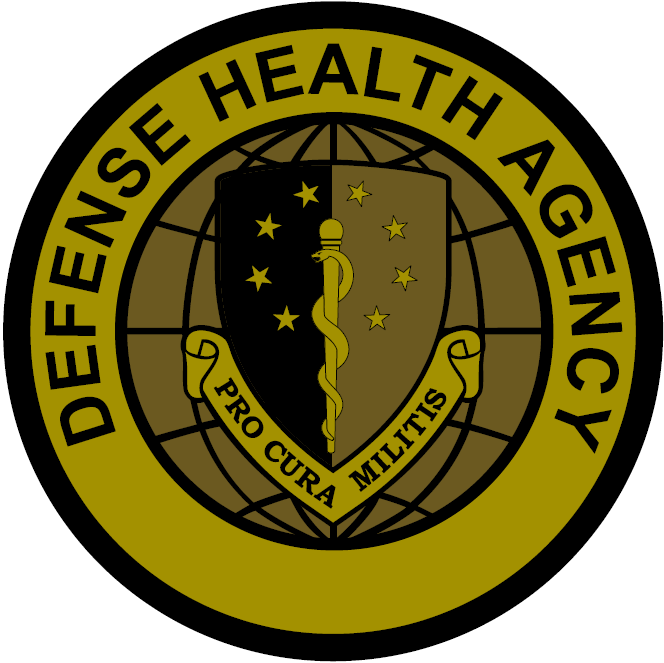
- Shoulder sleeve insignia worn by U.S. Army and U.S. Air Force elements

The Defense Health Agency (DHA) is a joint, integrated combat support agency that enables the U.S. Army, U.S. Navy, and U.S. Air Force medical services to provide a medically ready force and ready medical force to combatant commands in both peacetime and wartime. The DHA is in charge of integrating clinical and business operations across the Military Health System (MHS) and facilitates the delivery of integrated and reasonably priced health care to MHS clients.

As a part of the MHS, the DHA maintains a global workforce of almost 140,000 civilians and military personnel. Through TRICARE, the DHA manages a global health system serving 9.5M beneficiaries and supporting 700+ hospitals and clinics worldwide.

== History ==
The United States Department of Defense established the DHA as part of a larger effort meant to reorganize its health care programs and services. The reorganization was based in part on the recommendations of a task force that issued a report on the management of U.S. military health care in 2011. Under the old system, many aspects of military health care were managed by the individual armed services (Army, Navy, and Air Force).

== Structure ==
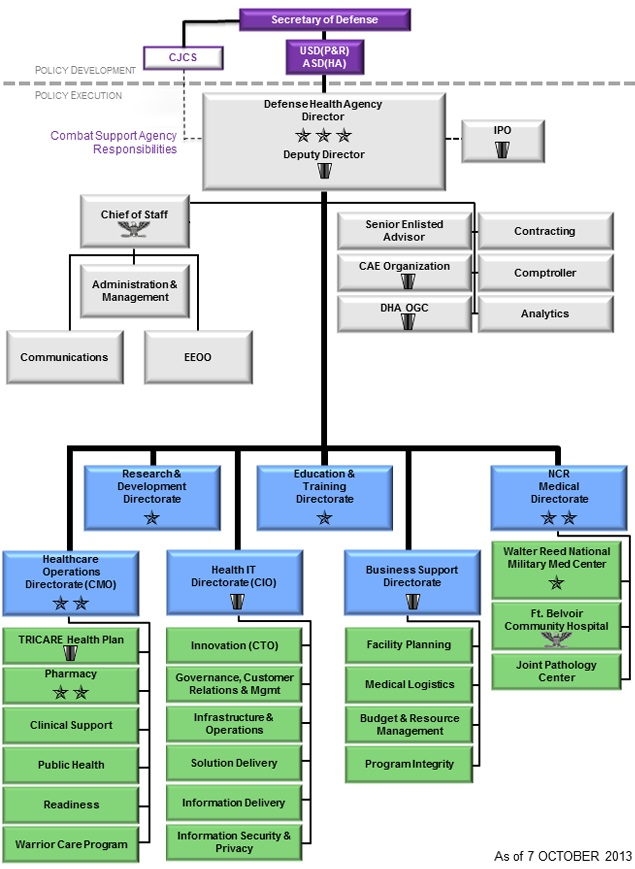
The organizational structure of the Defense Health Agency.

The DHA operates under the authority and oversight of the assistant secretary of defense for health affairs. The ASD(HA) is a civilian, Senate-confirmed official who serves as the chief medical adviser to the secretary of defense and oversees health policy and budgeting across the system, as well as directing the activities of the Defense Health Agency. (see organization chart, right).

=== Defense Health Networks ===
The Defense Health Agency implemented a deliberate organizational change to strengthen the management of health care delivery, combat support and support to the military health enterprise worldwide. Military hospitals and clinics are organized into one of nine Defense Health Networks enabling the Defense Health Agency to deliver high-quality health care. A Defense Health Network is a group of military medical and dental facilities that operates as a coordinated system and improves the delivery and continuity of health services.

=== National Capital Region Medical Directorate ===
The National Capital Region Medical Directorate is a medical directorate within the DHA.

=== Education & Training Directorate ===
Medical Education and Training Campus
See: Medical Education and Training Campus § Academics

== List of directors ==
No.	Director		Term			Service branch
No.	Portrait	Name	Took office	Left office	Term length	Service branch
1	Douglas J. Robb	Lieutenant General; Douglas J. Robb	October 1, 2013	November 2, 2015	2 years, 32 days	U.S. Air Force
2	Raquel C. Bono	Vice Admiral; Raquel C. Bono (born 1957)	November 2, 2015	September 4, 2019	3 years, 306 days	U.S. Navy
3	Ronald J. Place	Lieutenant General; Ronald J. Place	September 4, 2019	January 3, 2023	3 years, 121 days	U.S. Army
4	Telita Crosland	Lieutenant General; Telita Crosland	January 3, 2023	February 28, 2025	2 years, 56 days	U.S. Army
–	David J. Smith	David J. Smith; Acting	February 28, 2025	February 2, 2026	339 days	Senior Executive Service
5	Darin K. Via	Vice Admiral; Darin K. Via	February 2, 2026	Incumbent	218 days	U.S. Navy

== See also ==
- Assistant Secretary of Defense for Health Affairs
- Military Health System
- Military medicine
- Surgeon General of the United States Army
- Surgeon General of the United States Navy
- Surgeon General of the United States Air Force
- TRICARE
- Uniformed Services University of the Health Sciences
- US Family Health Plan
