= Clinical Genitourinary Cancer =

- Discipline: Oncology
- Language: English
- Edited by: James J. Hsieh

Publication details
- Former name(s): Clinical Prostate Cancer
- History: 2002–present
- Publisher: Elsevier (United States)
- Impact factor: 2.45 (2018)

Standard abbreviations
- ISO 4: Clin. Genitourin. Cancer

Indexing
- ISSN: 1558-7673

Links
- Journal homepage

Clinical Genitourinary Cancer is a peer-reviewed medical journal published by Elsevier, and previously by CIG Media Group (Cancer Information Group). The journal publishes articles on detection, diagnosis, prevention, and treatment of genitourinary cancers. The main emphasis is on recent scientific developments in all areas related to genitourinary cancers. The journal was previously published as Clinical Prostate Cancer through September 2005.

== Abstracting and indexing ==
Clinical Genitourinary Cancer indexed in Index Medicus/PubMed, EMBASE Excerpta Medica, ISI Current Contents, CINAHL (Cumulative Index to Nursing and Allied Health Literature), Chemical Abstracts, and Journal Citation Reports.

== Article types ==
The journal publishes Review, Perspective, Original Study, and Case Series.
