= US Family Health Plan =

The US Family Health Plan (USFHP) is a U.S. Department of Defense-sponsored healthcare plan that serves military family members exclusively. US Family Health Plan operates in six regions, sixteen states, including the District of Columbia.

== Services ==
USFHP delivers full TRICARE Prime benefits to more than 150,000 beneficiaries, including the family members of active-duty military, activated Guard and Reserve, and military retirees and their family members.

== Coverage ==
The US Family Health Plan currently offers more than 40 disease and case management programs across all of its sites.

Enrollment in the US Family Health Plan is offered through six community-based hospital and physician networks, known as Designated Providers.

== History ==
In 1981, Congress enacted the Omnibus Reconciliation Act designating certain former U.S. Public Health Service facilities as Uniformed Services Treatment Facilities (USTFs). The following year, the Department of Defense assumed responsibility for the USTF program from the Department of Health and Human Services. In 1993, the USTFs developed a managed care plan, called the Uniformed Services Family Health Plan, and in 1996, became “TRICARE Designated Providers”—the first DoD-sponsored, full-risk managed health care plan and the first to serve the military 65 and older population (other than on a limited demonstration basis). The Plan began offering the TRICARE Prime benefit the following year. In 2001, the name was shortened to US Family Health Plan.

== Awards ==
Having long served military families, the US Family Health Plan in 2008 was awarded an Emmy Award from the National Academy of Television Arts & Sciences for a 2007 public service announcement series, "Now is Our Time to Serve". This joint public service initiative with the non-profit National Military Family Association (NMFA) urged viewers to "support, befriend, remember and appreciate" America's military family members.
