= American Journal of Hematology =

- Discipline: Hematology
- Language: English
- Edited by: Carlo Brugnara

Publication details
- History: 1976–present
- Publisher: Wiley-Liss (United States)
- Frequency: Monthly
- Open access: Hybrid
- Impact factor: 12.8 (2022)

Standard abbreviations
- ISO 4: Am. J. Hematol.

Indexing
- CODEN: AJHEDD
- ISSN: 0361-8609 (print); 1096-8652 (web)

Links
- Journal homepage

American Journal of Hematology is an academic journal devoted to the coverage of blood diseases. It has been published since 1976. The editor-in-chief is Carlo Brugnara (Harvard Medical School). According to the Journal Citation Reports, the journal has a 2022 impact factor of 12.8, ranking it 7th out of 76 journals in the category "Hematology".
