= Tricare =

U.S. Department of Defense health care program

The Tricare logo

Tricare (styled TRICARE) is a health care program of the United States Department of Defense Military Health System. Tricare provides civilian health benefits for U.S Armed Forces military personnel, military retirees, and their dependents, including some members of the reserve component. Tricare is the civilian care component of the Military Health System, although historically it also included health care delivered in military medical treatment facilities.

The Tricare program is managed by the Defense Health Agency. Before 1 October 2013, it was managed by the Tricare Management Activity under the authority of the assistant secretary of defense (health affairs). On that date, it was disestablished and Tricare responsibility was transferred to the newly established Defense Health Agency.

The Department of Defense operates a health care delivery system that served approximately 9.4 million beneficiaries in 2018. The Department of Defense's unified medical program represents $50.6 billion or 8% of total FY2019 U.S. military spending. With the exception of active duty service members (who are assigned to the Tricare Prime option and pay no out-of-pocket costs for Tricare coverage), Military Health System beneficiaries may have a choice of Tricare plan options depending upon their status (e.g., active duty family member, retiree, reservist, child under age 26 ineligible for family coverage, Medicare-eligible, etc.) and geographic location.

== History ==
Historically, health care for military personnel and their dependents was provided in military medical facilities as promised by the military, and through a referral system by civilian medical personnel where military physicians were not available in a certain specialty, or when and where overcrowding of a military medical facility occurred.

Active duty military personnel always have priority for care in military medical facilities. After World War II and the Korean War, especially with the growth in the standing forces of the U.S. military due to the Cold War, access to care in military facilities became increasingly unavailable for military retirees and the dependents of both active duty and retired military personnel due to resource constraints and growing demands on the system. It was at this time that the concept of "space-available basis" for military retirees and military dependents was first noted. To address this problem, Congress passed the Dependents Medical Care Act of 1956 and the Military Medical Benefits Amendments of 1966. These acts allowed the Secretary of Defense to contract with civilian health care providers. This civilian health care program became known as the Civilian Health and Medical Program of the Uniformed Services (CHAMPUS) in 1966.

In the late 1980s, because of escalating costs, paperwork demands, and general beneficiary dissatisfaction, DoD initiated a series of demonstration projects. Under a program known as the CHAMPUS Reform Initiative, a contractor provided both health care and administrative-related services, including claims processing. The Tricare Reserve Retired project was one of the first to introduce managed care features to the CHAMPUS program. Beneficiaries were offered three choices – a health maintenance organization-like option called Tricare (CHAMPUS) Prime that required enrollment and offered enhanced benefits and low cost sharing, a preferred provider organization-like option called Tricare (CHAMPUS) Extra that required use of network providers in exchange for lower cost sharing, and the standard CHAMPUS option that continued the freedom of choice in selecting providers but required higher cost sharing and insurance deductibles known as Tricare Standard.

Although DOD's initial intent under the CHAMPUS Reform Initiative was to award three competitively bid contracts covering six states, only one bid, made by Foundation Health Corporation (now Health Net) covering California and Hawaii, was received. Foundation delivered services under this contract between August 1988 and January 1994.

In late 1993, in response to requirements in the National Defense Authorization Act for Fiscal Year 1994, the DoD announced plans for implementing a nationwide managed care program for the MHS that would be completely implemented by May 1997. Under this program, known as Tricare, the United States was divided into 12 health care regions. An administrative organization, the lead agent, was designated for each region and coordinated the health care needs of all military treatment facilities in the region. Under Tricare, seven managed care support contracts were awarded covering DOD's 12 health care regions.

Since then, Tricare has undergone several restructuring initiatives, including re-alignment of contract regions, the Base Realignment and Closure (BRAC) process that downgraded many military hospitals to clinics and closed other military hospitals and clinics outright, the addition of "Tricare for Life" (TFL) benefits in 2001 for military retirees and their spouses who are Medicare-eligible, and "Tricare Reserve Select" (TRS) for actively drilling Reservists, National Guardsmen, and their spouses and dependent children in 2005.

Since 2024, gender-affirming healthcare for children and minors within military families has not been permitted under Tricare following the entry into force of the yearly comprehensive defense authorization bill.

== Tricare's options ==
=== Enrollment-based Health Plans ===
==== Tricare Select ====
Tricare Select provides a similar benefit to the original CHAMPUS program and is available to Active Duty personnel, dependents, retirees from the Active Component, retirees from the Reserve Component age 60 or older, and their eligible family members.

Tricare Select is also available to reservists and their family under the Tricare Reserve Select Component. Under Tricare Select, beneficiaries can use any civilian health care provider that is payable under Tricare regulations. The beneficiary is responsible for payment of an annual deductible and coinsurance, and may be responsible for certain other out-of-pocket expenses. There were no enrollment fees for Tricare Select prior to 2021.

==== Tricare Prime ====
Tricare Prime is a health maintenance organization (HMO) style plan available to active duty personnel, retirees from the Active Component, retirees from the Reserve Component age 60 or older, and their eligible family members. Under Tricare Prime, beneficiaries must choose a primary care physician and obtain referrals and authorizations for specialty care. In return for these restrictions, beneficiaries are responsible only for small copayments for each visit (retirees and their families only). There is an annual enrollment fee for Tricare Prime for military retirees and their family members. There is no enrollment fee for active duty military and their family members. The majority of Tricare PRIME enrollees must exclusively use the MTF (Military Treatment Facility) to receive their care, as long as the MTF has capacity. If the MTF does not have capacity, the commander of the MTF notifies the region's contractor and the contractor's provider network is used to supplement the MTF's capacity. If the MTF regains capacity, the MTF reserves the right to move the beneficiaries back to receiving their care at the MTF in a process known as "recapture."

===== US Family Health Plan =====
US Family Health Plan, a Tricare Prime-sponsored health plan option, is made available by nonprofit health care providers in the Northeast U.S., Southeast Texas/Southwest Louisiana, and the Puget Sound region of Washington state.

=== Premium-based Health Plans ===
==== Tricare Reserve Select ====
Tricare Reserve Select is a premium-based health plan that active status qualified National Guard and Reserve members may purchase. The classification is sometimes referred to as Tricare Reserve Component (RC). It requires a monthly premium and offers coverage similar to Tricare Standard and Extra for the military member and eligible family members. It has a partial premium cost sharing arrangement with DoD similar to civilian private or public sector employer plans, although typically at a lower cost than civilian plans. The program coverage is available worldwide to Selected Reserve (SELRES) members of both the Title 10 USC Federal Reserve Components (Army Reserve, Navy Reserve, Air Force Reserve, Marine Corps Reserve), Title 14 USC Federal Reserve Component (Coast Guard Reserve) and the Title 32 National Guard (Army National Guard and Air National Guard) in a drill pay (also known as "paid") status.

As of February 2008, retired Reserve Component personnel under the age of 60, actively drilling Individual Ready Reserve (IRR) personnel in a non-paid status, or actively drilling Volunteer Training Unit (VTU) personnel in a non-paid status do not qualify for Tricare Reserve Select. Individual Ready Reserve and Volunteer Training Unit members are eligible for reinstatement under Tricare Reserve Select is they return to a SELRES or Drill Status Guardsman (DSG) status. Reserve Component personnel who are also full-time Federal civil servants (to include Army Reserve Technicians and Air Reserve Technicians in the Army Reserve, Army National Guard, Air Force Reserve and Air National Guard) and eligible for the Federal Employee Health Benefit Program (FEHBP) are also excluded from Tricare Reserve Select. Retired Reserve Component personnel and eligible dependent family members become eligible Tricare Standard, Tricare Extra or Tricare Prime on the service member's 60th birthday in the same manner as Active Component retirees and their eligible dependents are eligible immediately upon retirement from active service. Qualification questions should be referred to Tricare.

==== Tricare Reserve Retired ====
Tricare Reserve Retired is a premium-based health plan that qualified retired members of the National Guard and Reserve under the age of 60 may purchase for themselves and eligible family members. Established in 2008 and opened for enrollment in 2010, it is similar to Tricare Reserve Select, but differs in that there is no premium cost-sharing with DoD as there is with Tricare Reserve Select. As such, retired Reserve Component members who elect to purchase Tricare Reserve Retired must pay the full cost (100%) of the calculated premium plus an additional administrative fee. Payments could range as high as $900.00 a month. Although open to all eligible retired Reserve Component personnel under the age of 60, the program's principal focus is often perceived as being focused on recent Reserve Component retirees who are self-employed or otherwise ineligible for civilian employer provided/subsidized health insurance, especially those who were mobilized for full-time active duty service subsequent to 11 September 2001 in support of Operations Enduring Freedom, Iraqi Freedom, New Dawn and/or Noble Eagle. Retired Reserve Component personnel who elect to participate in Tricare Reserve Retired exit when the service member reaches age 60 and he/she and their eligible dependent family members become eligible for the same Tricare Standard, Tricare Extra or Tricare Prime options as Active Component retirees and, in the case of Tricare Prime, at the same cost as Active Component retirees. Qualification questions should be referred to Tricare.

==== Tricare Young Adult ====
Tricare Young Adult (TYA) is a premium-based health care plan available for purchase by qualified dependents who have aged out of Tricare at age 18 if no longer a full-time high school or college student, or age 23 for full-time civilian college students. Dependents are eligible if they are unmarried, not eligible for either other Tricare coverage or their own employer-sponsored health care coverage, and their sponsor is Tricare eligible.

=== Medicare-wraparound Coverage ===
==== Tricare for Life ====
Tricare for Life was first incorporated as part of the then-seven regional Managed Care Support Contracts of Tricare in May 2001. The benefit was enacted by Congress in response to growing complaints from beneficiaries that as Medicare out of pocket costs increased a benefit was needed to pay these costs in lieu of Tricare retirees being required to purchase Medicare Supplemental Coverage to pay for prescriptions, physician and hospital dispensed drugs, cost shares and deductibles. Before Tricare for Life, Tricare beneficiaries immediately lost Tricare coverage upon attaining Medicare eligibility at age 65, placing them at the same level of coverage as U.S. citizens who had never served full 20 to 30-plus year careers in the armed forces. This included becoming Medicare eligible due to disability.

Tricare for Life is designed to pay patient liability after Medicare payments. There is no enrollment necessary for Tricare for Life but, to be eligible, retired service members and their spouses over age 65 must be Tricare and Medicare eligible and have purchased Medicare Part B coverage. An exception to the requirement for Part B coverage exists when the beneficiary that is Medicare eligible is the spouse of an Active Duty Service Member.

In some instances, Tricare for Life is primary payer when the services are normally a Tricare benefit but not covered by Medicare. This includes drug charges, when Medicare benefit limits are attained and services performed outside the United States or in a Veterans Affairs facility where Medicare does not pay. Tricare for Life does not pay patient liability for services that are not a Tricare benefit even though they may be paid by Medicare, such as chiropractic benefits. The policy limitations applying to Tricare also apply to Tricare for Life and must therefore be deemed medically necessary and skilled care. Custodial care therefore is not covered. In 2004, the Tricare for Life benefit was transferred from the individual regional Tricare contractors. Medical claims are processed by the national Tricare Dual Eligible Fiscal Intermediary Contractor. Pharmacy claims are processed by the Tricare Pharmacy Contractor (Express Scripts) and Overseas Tricare for Life claims are processed by the Tricare Overseas Program Contractor (as of September 2010 this will be International SOS using Wisconsin Physicians Service as their Fiscal Intermediary partner).

The signing of the National Defense Authorization Act in January 2011 aligned Tricare with the provisions of the 2010 Patient Protection and Affordable Care Act and led to the creation of TYA. Enrollment began on 1 May 2011.

== Program administration ==
The ultimate responsible organization for administration of Tricare is the U.S. Department of Defense Military Health System, which organized the Tricare Management Activity. The Tricare Management Activity contracts with several large health insurance corporations to provide claims processing, customer service and other administrative functions to the Tricare program.

=== Basic structure ===
Currently, there are three regional managed-care support contractors, a Medicare/Tricare dual-eligible fiscal intermediary contractor, and a Tricare pharmacy contractor, who administers both mail-order pharmacy and retail pharmacy programs. In addition several administrative contractors provide quality management, auditing, and statistical services.

=== Dental insurance ===
Tricare Management Activity contracts and administers dental programs.

- United Concordia Dental – as Tricare Dental Program
- Delta Dental – as Tricare Retiree Dental Program

=== Health insurance ===
In 2004, Tricare Management Activity re-aligned the previous twelve regions into three large regions, known as Tricare North, Tricare South, and Tricare West. Services in these regions are provided by:

- North – Health Net Federal Services, LLC The North Region includes Connecticut, Delaware, the District of Columbia, Illinois, Indiana, Kentucky, Maine, Maryland, Massachusetts, Michigan, New Hampshire, New Jersey, New York, North Carolina, Ohio, Pennsylvania, Rhode Island, Vermont, Virginia, West Virginia, Wisconsin and portions of Iowa (Rock Island Arsenal area), Missouri (St. Louis area) and Tennessee (Ft. Campbell area).
- South – Humana Military Healthcare Services, Inc. The South Region includes Alabama, Arkansas, Florida, Georgia, Louisiana, Mississippi, Oklahoma, South Carolina, Tennessee (excluding the Ft. Campbell area) and Texas (excluding the El Paso area).
- West – UnitedHealth Group#UnitedHealthcare The West Region includes Alaska, Arizona, California, Colorado, Hawaii, Idaho, Iowa (excluding Rock Island Arsenal area), Kansas, Minnesota, Missouri (except the St. Louis area), Montana, Nebraska, Nevada, New Mexico, North Dakota, Oregon, South Dakota, Texas (the southwestern corner, including El Paso), Utah, Washington and Wyoming.

All medical claims are processed ("adjudicated") by the following claims processing sub-contractors:

- North, South and West – PGBA, LLC (a subsidiary of BlueCross BlueShield of South Carolina)
- Tricare Overseas claims and Tricare for Life – Wisconsin Physicians Service Insurance Corporation

In 2009, the Tricare Overseas Program contract consolidated the following:

- Overseas enrollment
- Tricare Overseas claims processing
- Three area Tricare Service Center contracts
- Tricare Global Remote Overseas
- Tricare Puerto Rico Prime

In October 2009 International SOS Assistance, Inc. was awarded the contract to provide comprehensive health care support services to the Department of Defense Tricare Overseas Program.

On January 1, 2018 the Tricare Stateside regions were consolidated into two large regions, Tricare East and Tricare West.

TRICARE Stateside Regions Map - As of 1 January 2025

Effective 1 January 2025, the contractors and areas for Tricare East and Tricare West are as follows:

- West – TriWest Healthcare Alliance. The West Region includes Alaska, Arkansas*, Arizona, California, Colorado, Hawaii, Idaho, Indiana*, Illinois, Iowa, Kansas, Louisiana, Minnesota, Missouri*, Montana, Nebraska, Nevada, New Mexico, North Dakota, Oklahoma, Oregon, South Dakota, Texas, Utah, Washington, Wisconsin*, and Wyoming.
- East – Humana Military Healthcare Services, Inc. The East Region includes Alabama, Arkansas*, Connecticut, Delaware, District of Columbia, Florida, Georgia, Indiana*, Kentucky, Maine, Maryland, Massachusetts, Michigan, Mississippi, Missouri*, New Hampshire, New Jersey, New York, North Carolina, Ohio, Pennsylvania, Rhode Island, South Carolina, Tennessee, Vermont, Virginia, West Virginia, Wisconsin*

Note: That Arkansas, Indiana, Missouri, and Wisconsin have ZIP codes in both the West and East Regions.

== See also ==
- US Family Health Plan
- Health insurance in the United States
