= Defense Academic Information Technology Consortium =

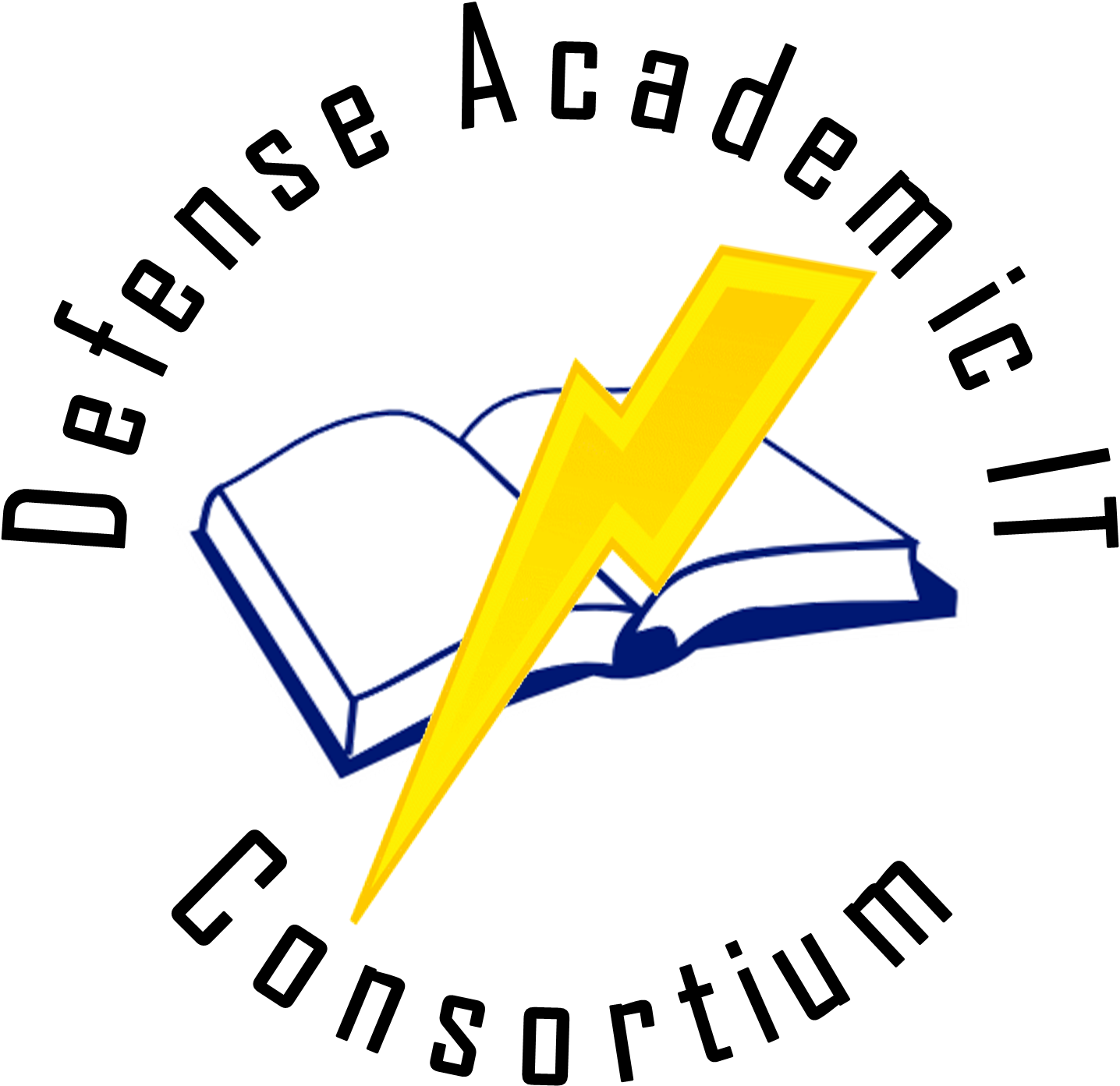
- Defense Academic Information Technology Consortium Logo

Agency overview
- Formed: May 1, 2008
- (etc.)
- Minister responsible: (etc.)
- Agency executive: (etc.)
- Parent agency: U.S. Department of Defense
- Child agencies: (etc.)

The Defense Academic Information Technology Consortium (or DAITC), formerly the Department of Defense Education Information Security Working Group (DODEISWG), is an organization consisting of IT leadership from a number of United States Federal Government academic degree-granting institutions. The group advocates the use of information technology resources to advance the educational mission of the U.S. Department of Defense and other federal agencies.

DAITC was organized and founded by the Naval War College in May 2008 and disbanded at the direction of Naval War College leadership in October 2009.

Talk of its demise, however, was somewhat premature. Chairmanship was moved to the National Defense University in 2009. The group narrowed its focus and membership so that it could address problems among accredited academic institutions more effectively. Meetings have been held every six months at different sites. Currently, the DAITC meets in conjunction with the Military Education Coordination Council's (MECC) Distance Learning Coordination Council (DLCC) and the MECC's Library working group.

== United States Federal Academic Degree Granting Institutions ==
- Department of the Air Force
  - Air Force Institute of Technology
  - Air University
  - U.S. Air Force Academy
- Department of the Army
  - U.S. Army Command & General Staff College
  - U.S. Army War College
  - U.S. Military Academy
- Department of the Navy
  - Marine Corps University
  - Naval Postgraduate School
  - Naval War College
  - U.S. Naval Academy
- Other DoD
  - Defense Academy for Credibility Assessment
  - Defense Language Institute Foreign Language Center
  - National Defense Intelligence College
  - National Defense University
  - Uniformed Services University of the Health Sciences
- Non-DOD
  - U.S. Coast Guard Academy
  - U.S. Merchant Marine Academy

== Conferences ==
- Naval War College, Newport, Rhode Island - 25 September 2008
- Uniformed Services University of the Health Sciences, Bethesda, Maryland - 18–19 June 2009
- Denver, Colorado (in conjunction with EDUCAUSE 2009 - November 2009
- Air University, Maxwell AFB, Montgomery, Alabama - March 2010
- Naval War College, Newport, Rhode Island - September 2010
- Joint Forces Staff College, Norfolk, Virginia - March 2011
