= Grieder =

Grieder is a surname. Notable people with the surname include:

- Alfons Grieder (1939–2003), Swiss rudimental drummer
- Carol Greider (born 1961), American molecular biologist
- Daniel Grieder (born 1961), Swiss entrepreneur and business executive
- Erhard Grieder (fl. 1941–1942), Swiss footballer
- Franziska Grieder (fl. from 1993), Swiss-American veterinary scientist
- Hans Grieder (1901–1995), Swiss gymnast
- Jean Grieder (1874–1941), Swiss businessman
- Martin Grieder (1828–1890), birth name of Martin Birmann, Swiss politician
