= Kobi Peleg =

Israeli professor of Emergency and Disaster Management (born 1958)

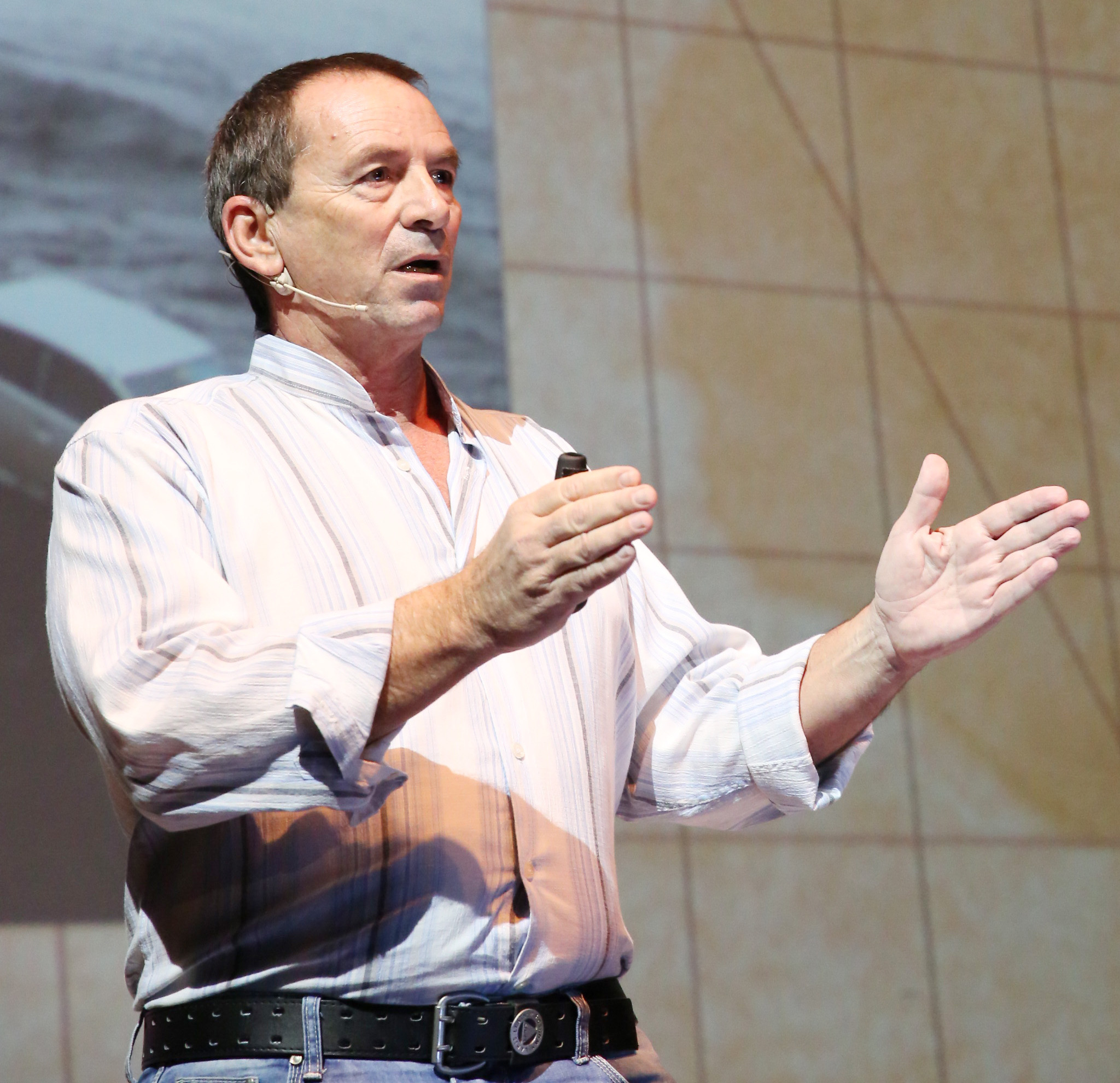
Kobi Peleg at an "Atnachta" (Pausa) event at Tel-Aviv University, Jan. 2017

Kobi (Jacob) Peleg (born 1958) is an Israeli professor of Emergency and Disaster Management at the Tel-Aviv University, and formerly the director of the Israel National Center for Trauma & Emergency Medicine Research at the Gertner Institute for Epidemiology and Health Policy Research.

== Biography ==
Peleg was raised in Ramat-Gan. He joined the Israel Defense Forces (IDF) in 1976 and served as a paratrooper until his enrollment into medics' course. He completed his officer's training and was promoted as a medical organization officer.

Peleg served in a number of positions in the Medical Corps of the IDF, including chief instructor at the IDF's medical training school and commander of the training facility of the Medical Corps. During the First Gulf War, he served as the head of the medicine branch at the civil defense directorate (nowadays: Home Front Command) and was tasked with overseeing the medical operations at the home front. Between 1997 and 1998, while in uniforms, he was lent to the Ministry of Health to serve as a senior consultant to the Minister, as well as a board member of Magen David Adom (Israel's Emergency Medical Services).

Between 1998 and 2001 he was the commander of the IDF's Medical Training School. During this period he was tasked with the medical management of many mass casualty incidents throughout Israel. He was discharged from military service as an Army Colonel.

Peleg holds a Bachelor's degree in politics, sociology and psychology from Bar-Ilan University, a Master's degree in public health with emphasis on health management from The Uniformed Services University of the Health Sciences (Bethesda, Maryland), and a PhD in Health Administration and Policy from Ben-Gurion University of the Negev.

Following his discharge from the IDF, he established the National Center for Trauma & Emergency Medicine Research at Gertner Institute. The center deals with the study of injury in Israel and abroad and is considered one of the leading research centers in the field of injury epidemiology, specifically in the field of mass casualty and terrorism. The center is also serving as the home of national trauma registry of Israel, which was established in 1995 by Vita Barell. Since its establishment, the center has published close to 200 papers in leading medical journals

In 2005, Peleg co-established the Master's Program for Emergency and Disaster Management at Tel-Aviv University. In 2010, the program was expanded to include an international equivalent for foreign students. Since their establishment, these programs qualified hundreds of alumni who were incorporated into emergency management and humanitarian relief work in Israel and elsewhere.

In 2008, he was appointed as an expert by the United Nations Disaster Assessment and Coordination, a UN agency for international emergency response for sudden-onset emergencies. In parallel, he was tasked by the World Health Organization to serve as a mentor in the verification process of emergency medical teams responding to disaster-stricken regions. In 2017, he was elected chairperson of the board of directors of the World Association for Disaster and Emergency Medicine. In addition, he holds several positions as board member in national and international committees, such as the Israeli National Committee for Mass Casualty Management.

== Research contributions ==
In his position as the head of the National Center for Trauma & Emergency Medicine Research, Peleg led several studies in the field of disaster medicine and terror-related injuries.

Among these is a pioneering study performed in the 1990s to develop an optimized, GIS-based model for reducing ambulances' response time in emergencies. This is one of the most cited papers in the field of disaster medicine and has become a cornerstone in designing ambulance architecture in many developed countries. Other important studies performed or led by Prof. Peleg concern differences in injury patterns between war and terror injuries, civilian versus military casualties, and gunshot compared to blast injuries. In addition, Prof. Peleg was also leading an innovative research that explored different reimbursement methods to influence higher survivability among hip fracture patients. The study was extensively cited and its outcomes led to health policy changes in Israel and abroad.

Additional studies performed or led by Prof. Peleg brought about significant insights for the understanding of terror-related injury mechanisms, including the development of a new paradigm of injuries from terrorist explosions as a function of explosion setting type. Also among these are studies relating to characterization of injury patterns resulting from terror incidents and optimization of hospitals responses to mass casualty incidents. The research conducted by Prof. Peleg greatly contributed to Israeli and worldwide improvement of medical treatment of injuries resulting from mass-casualty incidents.

== Humanitarian aid ==
Peleg is highly involved in humanitarian aid to disaster affected areas. In December 1988 he served as the deputy head of the medical delegation (field hospital) to Kirovakan (today: Vanadzor) in Armenia. In 1995 he participated and was responsible for the operational dispatching of the IDF's field hospital following the Rwandan genocide. In September 2009, he was dispatched as an UNDAC expert to assist the government of Indonesia in assessing the needs and coordinating international aid following the West Sumatra earthquake.

Several months later, following the devastating 2010 Haiti earthquake, he joined the Israeli field hospital to extend medical aid to casualties. Similarly, in 2013, he participated in the Israeli field hospital dispatched to assist the victims of Typhoon Haiyan in the Philippines. In 2015, he was again dispatched as an UNDAC expert to coordinate the medical relief to earthquake-struck Nepal, where he collaborated with other UN and WHO experts to establish a more robust mechanism for assessing medical needs and coordinating medical aid extended by international medical teams.

The experience gained by Prof. Peleg in his humanitarian work brought him to suggest paradigm-shifting recommendations in the field of medical relief post disasters. In particular, Prof. Peleg is leading a global effort to expand mass training of the public in light search and rescue skills. This innovative approach to life saving following massive earthquakes draws from both academic sources and field experience.
