= Henry M. Jackson Foundation for the Advancement of Military Medicine =

Non-profit organization

- Formation: 1983
- Headquarters: Bethesda, Maryland, U.S.
- Website: www.hjf.org

The Henry M. Jackson Foundation for the Advancement of Military Medicine (HJF) is a global non-profit organization created by the U.S. Congress in 1983.

HJF serves as a link between the military medical community, federal and private partners, and American service members, veterans, and civilians who benefit from the foundation's research.

== History ==
HJF was created to support Uniformed Services University of the Health Sciences (USUHS) and throughout the military medical community. HJF was named in honor of Washington state senator Henry "Scoop" Jackson, who sponsored the original legislation.

HJF provides scientific and management services, from infrastructure development, financial administration, clinical trials management to staffing and event planning. HJF works with a variety of programs, from large multi-site clinical trials to small, bench top projects, both nationally and abroad.

Long-time chief executive officer and president John W. Lowe retired after 25 years of serving HJF in May 2017. Retired Army Major General (Dr.) Joseph Caravalho, Jr. was named HJF CEO and president on September 1, 2017.

HJF acquired CAMRIS International in October 2020.

== Partnerships & Initiatives ==
In 2000, HJF established the John W. Lowe Joint Office of Technology Transfer (JOTT) in partnership with USU. This department helps scientists expedite their novel inventions, devices and technologies to possible patenting and commercialization. The JOTT has won six Federal Laboratory Consortium awards (2012, 2013, 2014, 2016, 2017, 2018).

HJF supports hundreds of additional research projects at USUHS and throughout military medicine, including the Center for Prostate Disease Research,[4] the Center for the Study of Traumatic Stress,[6] and the Center for Disaster and Humanitarian Assistance Medicine.[7] HJF's largest program is the U.S. Military HIV Research Program (MHRP), whose mission is to protect U.S. military personnel and aid the international fight against HIV. Established in 1988, the program focuses on HIV vaccine development, prevention, disease surveillance, care and treatment for HIV.

Contracting through the Defense Department, HJF supports the work of the U.S. Army Medical Research Directorate-Africa in Nairobi, Kenya; Dar es Salaam, Tanzania; and Kampala, Uganda.

The HJF is part of The Surgical Critical Care Initiative (SC2i). Created in 2013 and funded by the Department of Defense's Defense Health Program.

In February 2021, USUHS and HJF entered into a Cooperative Research and Development Agreement (CRADA) with OYE Therapeutics, a Purdue University-affiliated company “working to reduce the mortality and morbidity resulting from injuries on the battlefield through the development of new life-saving strategies.”
