= Jamie Lee Henry =

American military officer and doctor

Major Jamie Lee Henry
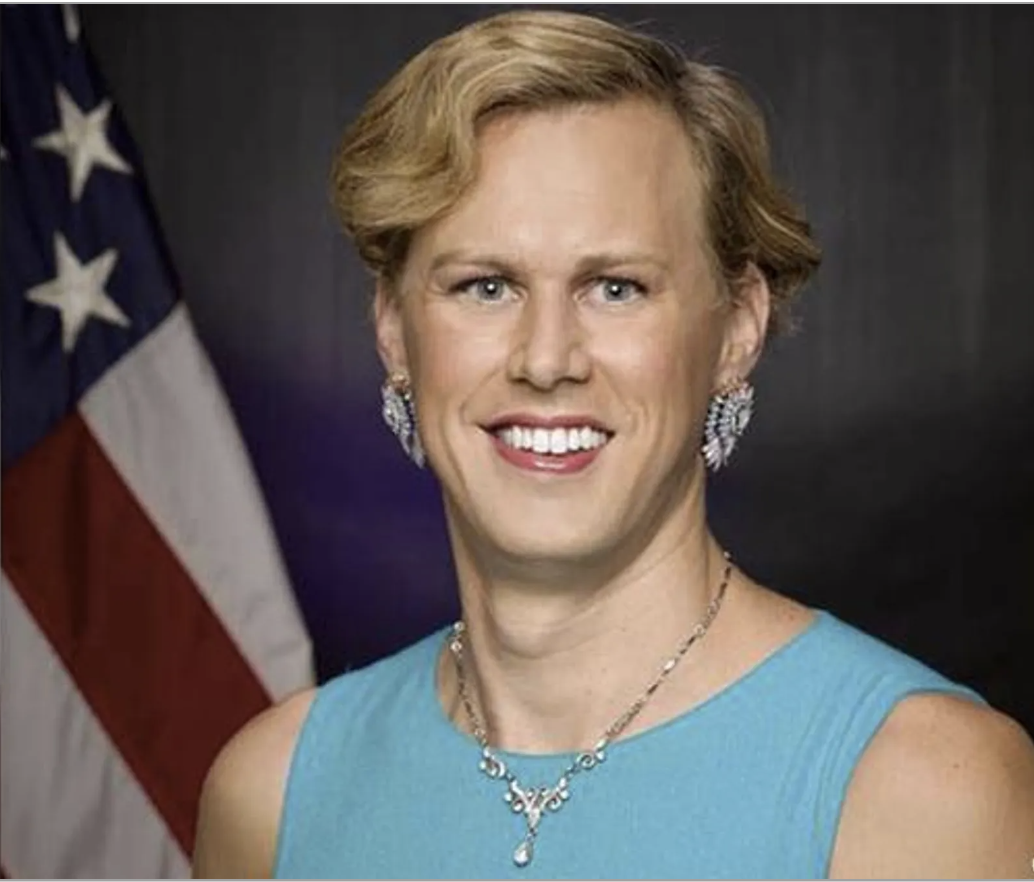
- Military career
- Allegiance: United States of America
- Branch: United States Army; United States Army Medical Corps
- Service years: 2007–present
- Rank: Major
- Education: Furman University (BS); Uniformed Services University of the Health Sciences (MD)
- Occupation: doctor
- Spouse: Anna Gabrielian

Major Jamie Lee Henry is an American doctor and officer in the United States Army Medical Corps. In 2015, she came out as a transgender woman, becoming the first-known openly transgender active duty officer in the United States Armed Forces.

Henry and her wife were indicted in 2022 for HIPAA violations and conspiracy, but the case was subsequently dismissed in 2024.

== Early life and education ==
Henry is the daughter of an orthopedic surgeon and grew up in a conservative, Christian family. She joined the Reserve Officers' Training Corps while an undergraduate student at Furman University, where she graduated in 2003 with a degree in biochemistry. Henry earned a medical degree from the F. Edward Hébert School of Medicine at the Uniformed Services University of the Health Sciences.

== Career ==
Henry is a physician and served as an officer in the United States Army Medical Corps. She entered active-duty service in May 2007 and was assigned to Fort Bragg as a staff internist with the rank of major.

In March 2015, she became the first known active-duty officer in the United States Army to come out as transgender, and she became the first active-duty service member to have a name change and gender change within the United States Armed Forces.

On September 25, 2015, Henry was the inaugural recipient of the Dr. Mary Walker Award from Whitman-Walker Health

=== Conspiracy indictment ===
In September 2022, Henry and her wife were arrested and indicted on conspiracy charges for allegedly violating the Health Insurance Portability and Accountability Act (HIPAA) by attempting to transfer confidential military medical information to Russia. They were charged with conspiracy and wrongful disclosure of individually identifiable health information about patients at Fort Bragg in an unsealed indictment in the U.S. District Court for the Northern Division of Maryland. The indictment alleged that, following Russia's invasion of Ukraine during the Russo-Ukrainian War, Henry and Gabrielian tried to assist the Russian government by providing data to help Russia "gain insights into the medical conditions of individuals associated with the U.S. government and military."

Henry and her wife reportedly met with an undercover agent of the Federal Bureau of Investigation, whom they thought was a Russian official, where Henry allegedly told the agent that she was "committed to Russia" and even contemplated volunteering to join the Russian Army.

Henry was released and placed on home detention.

The case was declared a mistrial in 2023 and was refiled under the Speedy Trial Act. In May 2024, U.S. District Court Judge Stephanie A. Gallagher dismissed the case against Henry and Gabrielian, citing government neglect of speedy trial obligations.

== Personal life ==
Henry is married to Anna Gabrielian, a former anesthesiologist at Johns Hopkins Hospital. They live in Rockville, Maryland.
