= Nicholas Grosso =

American orthopedic surgeon

Nicholas Grosso is an American orthopedic surgeon who is the President of the Centers for Advanced Orthopedics. He has served in the role since 2013 when approximately 130 orthopedic physicians came together to form the Centers for Advanced Orthopedics, which today is the largest private orthopedic group in the United States.

Gross is a Veteran of the United States Army, earning his MD at the Uniformed Services University of the Health Sciences and performing his residency at Walter Reed Army Medical Center. He is a contributor to conversations on migration of orthopedic procedures to outpatient surgery centers as well as alternative payment models.
