= Joseph Caravalho =

United States Army general

Major General Joseph Caravalho
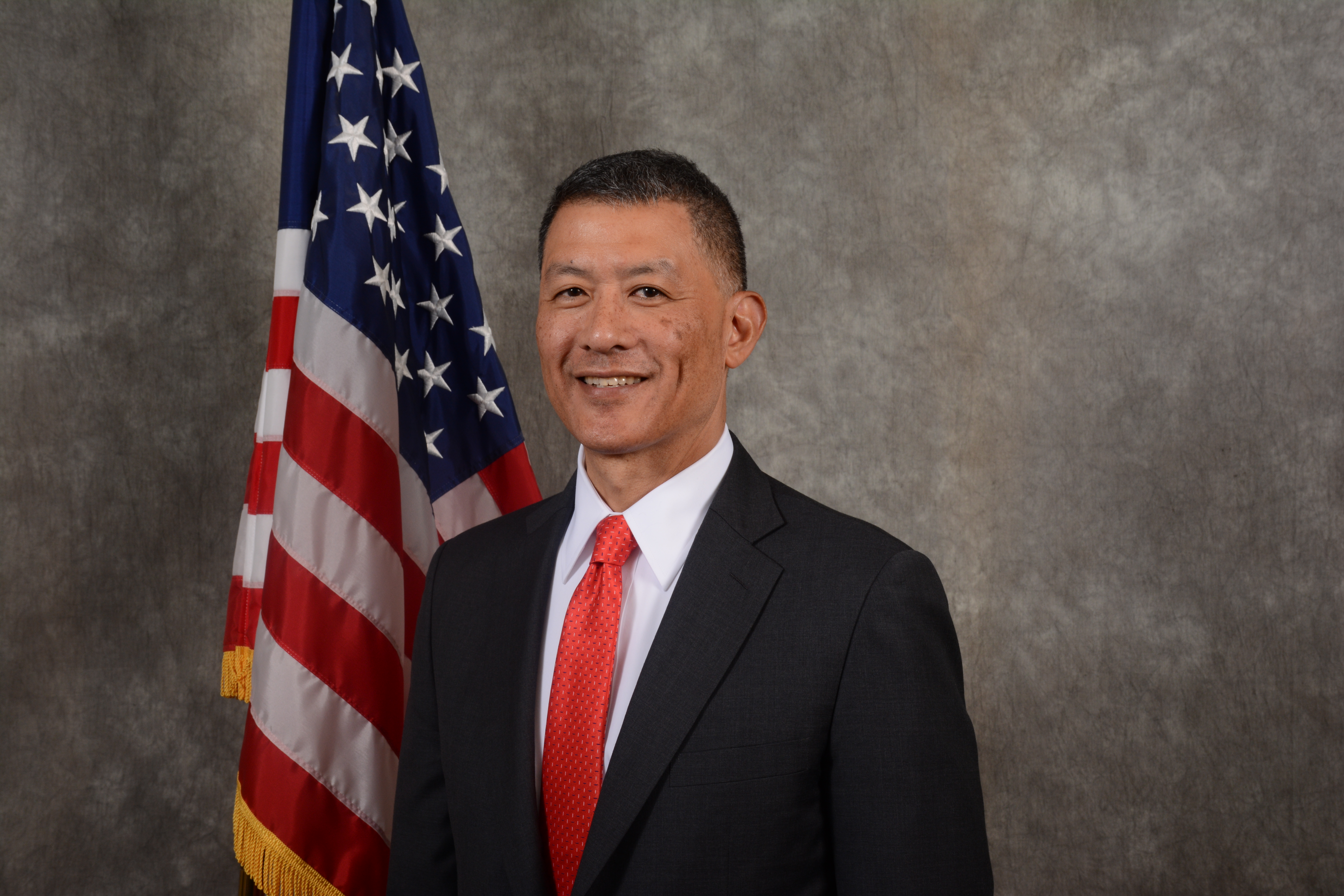
- Caravalho in 2017
- Born: Joseph Caravalho, Jr. 1957 (age 68–69); Kaneohe, Hawaii, United States
- Military career
- Allegiance: United States
- Branch: United States Army
- Service years: 1979 - 2017
- Rank: Major General
- Commands: Southern Regional Medical Command; Brooke Army Medical Center; Medical Research and Materiel Command; Joint Staff Surgeon
- Awards: Distinguished Service Medal; Legion of Merit; Bronze Star Medal; Defense Meritorious Service Medal; Meritorious Service Medal

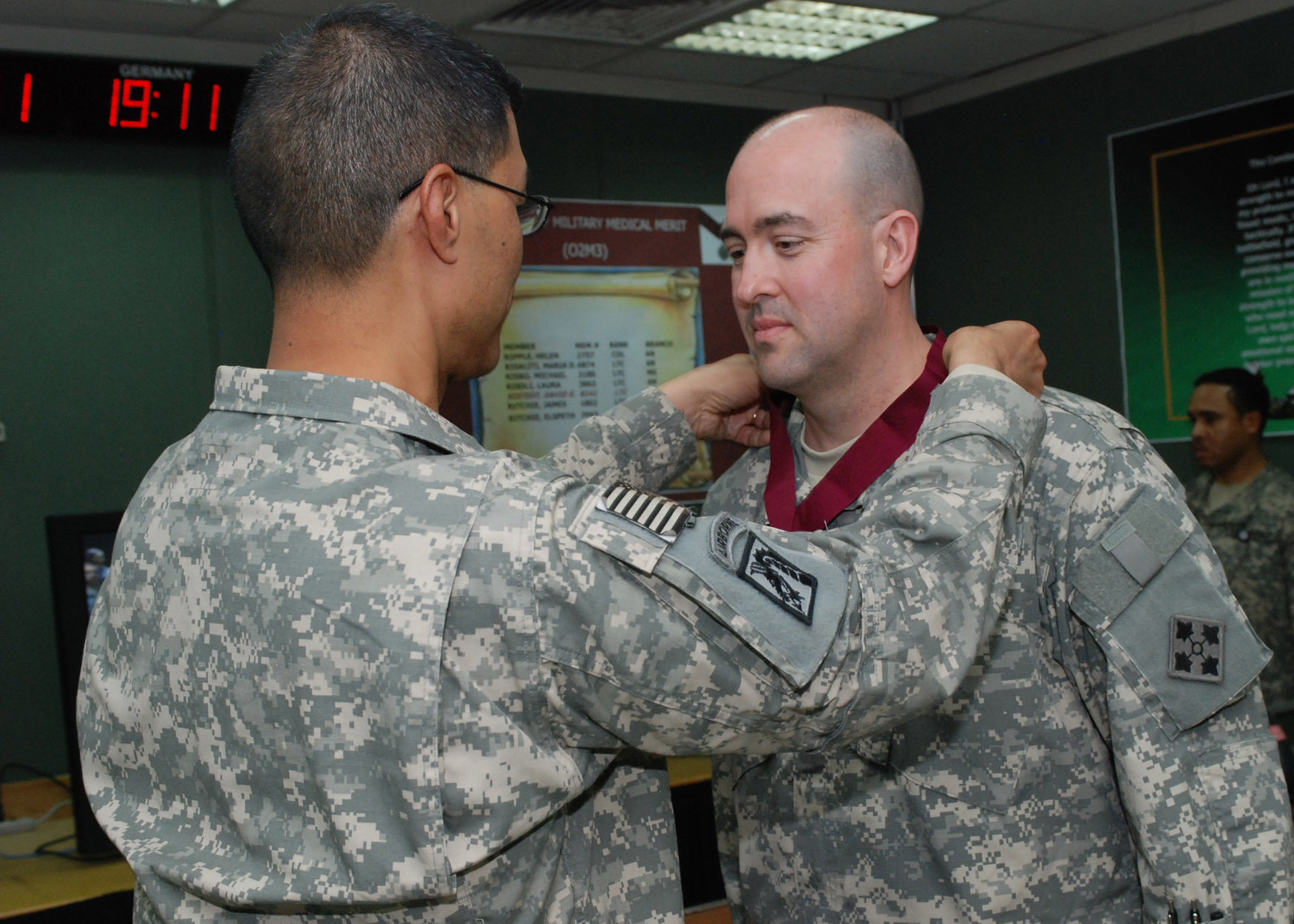
Caravalho presenting the Order of Military Medical Merit to Lt. Col. David Ristedt, January 5, 2009

Joseph Caravalho Jr. (born c. 1957) is an American physician and retired Major General of the Medical Corps of the United States Army. He is currently the president and CEO of the Henry M. Jackson Foundation for the Advancement of Military Medicine. He has held specialized staff medical positions, served in operations at hospitals, and commanded major medical installations across the United States as well as operations in actions overseas. In December 2015, he was appointed as the Joint Staff surgeon, the chief medical advisor to the Chairman of the Joint Chiefs of Staff.

== Early life and education ==
Joseph Caravalho Jr. was born in 1957 in Hawaii to Agnes and Joseph Caravalho Sr. and grew up in Kaneohe, Oahu. His family is of Puerto Rican and Chinese descent. He attended St. Louis High School in Honolulu. He graduated from Gonzaga University in Spokane, Washington, with a BS in mathematics in 1979 and was commissioned a second lieutenant through the Army ROTC Program. He then completed his medical degree at the Uniformed Services University of the Health Sciences School of Medicine, and was commissioned a captain in the United States Army Medical Corps. He is also a graduate of the Army War College, where he earned a master's degree in strategic studies.

== Career ==
Caravalho has held positions as a staff internist, nuclear medicine physician, and cardiologist. He served as Chief of Cardiology at Tripler Army Medical Center, Honolulu, Hawaii, and as Deputy Commander for Clinical Services at Womack Army Medical Center in Fort Bragg, North Carolina.

His operational medical experience includes assignments as Surgeon, 1st Battalion, 1st Special Forces Group (Airborne), Okinawa, Japan; Physician Augmentee, Joint Special Operations Command, Fort Bragg; Surgeon, 75th Ranger Regiment, Fort Benning, GA; Deputy Chief of Staff, Surgeon, U.S. Army Special Operations Command; Assistant Chief of Staff, Health Affairs, XVIII Airborne Corps, Fort Bragg. He also commanded the 28th Combat Support Hospital and the 44th Medical Command (Rear) (Provisional), both at Fort Bragg.

He has had two deployments in support of Operation Iraqi Freedom, most recently serving as the Surgeon for both Multi-National Force-Iraq and Multi-National Corps-Iraq. After his last deployment, he served as the Commanding General for Great Plains Regional Medical Command (RMC). Following USAMEDCOM reorganization, he commanded both Southern RMC and Brooke AMC, at Fort Sam Houston, Texas. Caravalho served as Commanding General, Northern RMC, Fort Belvoir, Virginia. He next served as Commanding General, U.S. Army Medical Research and Materiel Command, and Fort Detrick, at Fort Detrick, Maryland. In 2015 he was selected as Deputy Surgeon General and Deputy Commanding General (Support), United States Army Medical Command. In December 2015, it was announced that Caravalho was assigned to the Joint Staff as chief medical advisor ("Joint Staff Surgeon"). Caravalho joined The Henry M. Jackson Foundation for the Advancement of Military Medicine The Henry M. Jackson Foundation for the Advancement of Military Medicine welcomed Caravalho as their president and CEO on September 1, 2017, where he currently serves as leadership for 2800 medical and research professionals.

== Awards and recognitions ==
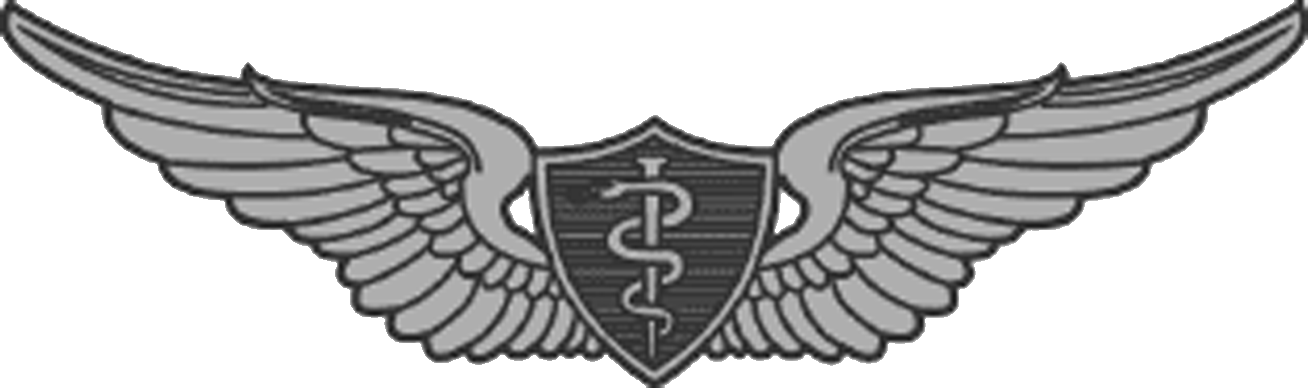
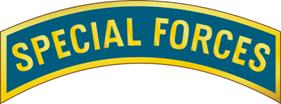
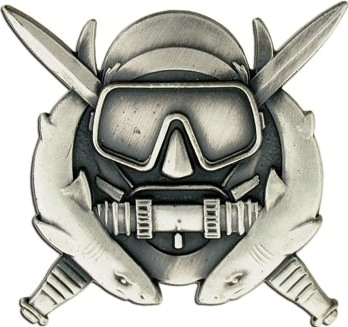
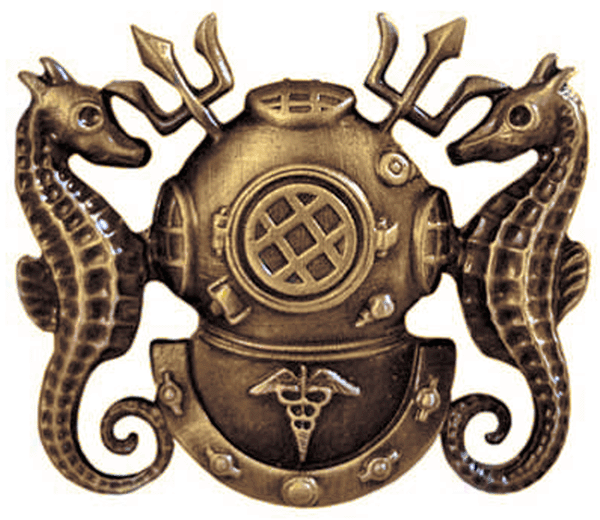
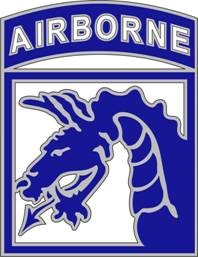
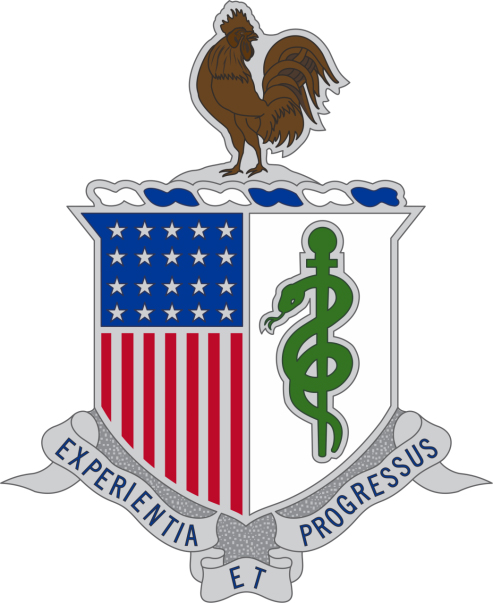
Expert Field Medical Badge
Basic Flight Surgeon Badge
Special Forces Tab
Ranger Tab
Basic Parachutist Badge
Special Operations Diver Badge
Navy Diving Medical Officer Insignia
Office of the Joint Chiefs of Staff Identification Badge
Army Staff Identification Badge
XVIII Airborne Corps Combat Service Identification Badge
Army Medical Department (AMEDD) Distinctive Unit Insignia
Thai Parachutist Badge
Philippine Parachutist Badge
2 Overseas Service Bars

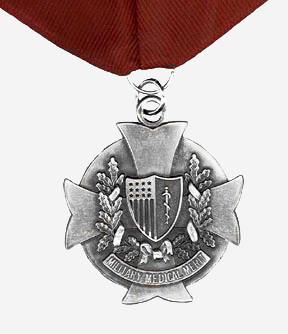
Army Distinguished Service Medal with three bronze oak leaf clusters
Legion of Merit with oak leaf cluster
Bronze Star Medal
Defense Meritorious Service Medal
Meritorious Service Medal with six oak leaf clusters
Joint Service Commendation Medal
Army Commendation Medal
Army Achievement Medal with three oak leaf clusters
Joint Meritorious Unit Award with oak leaf cluster
Meritorious Unit Commendation
Army Superior Unit Award
National Defense Service Medal with one bronze service star
Iraq Campaign Medal with three service stars
Global War on Terrorism Service Medal
Army Service Ribbon
Army Overseas Service Ribbon with bronze award numeral 5
Order of Military Medical Merit
