= Thomas D. Kirsch =

American physician, scientist and writer

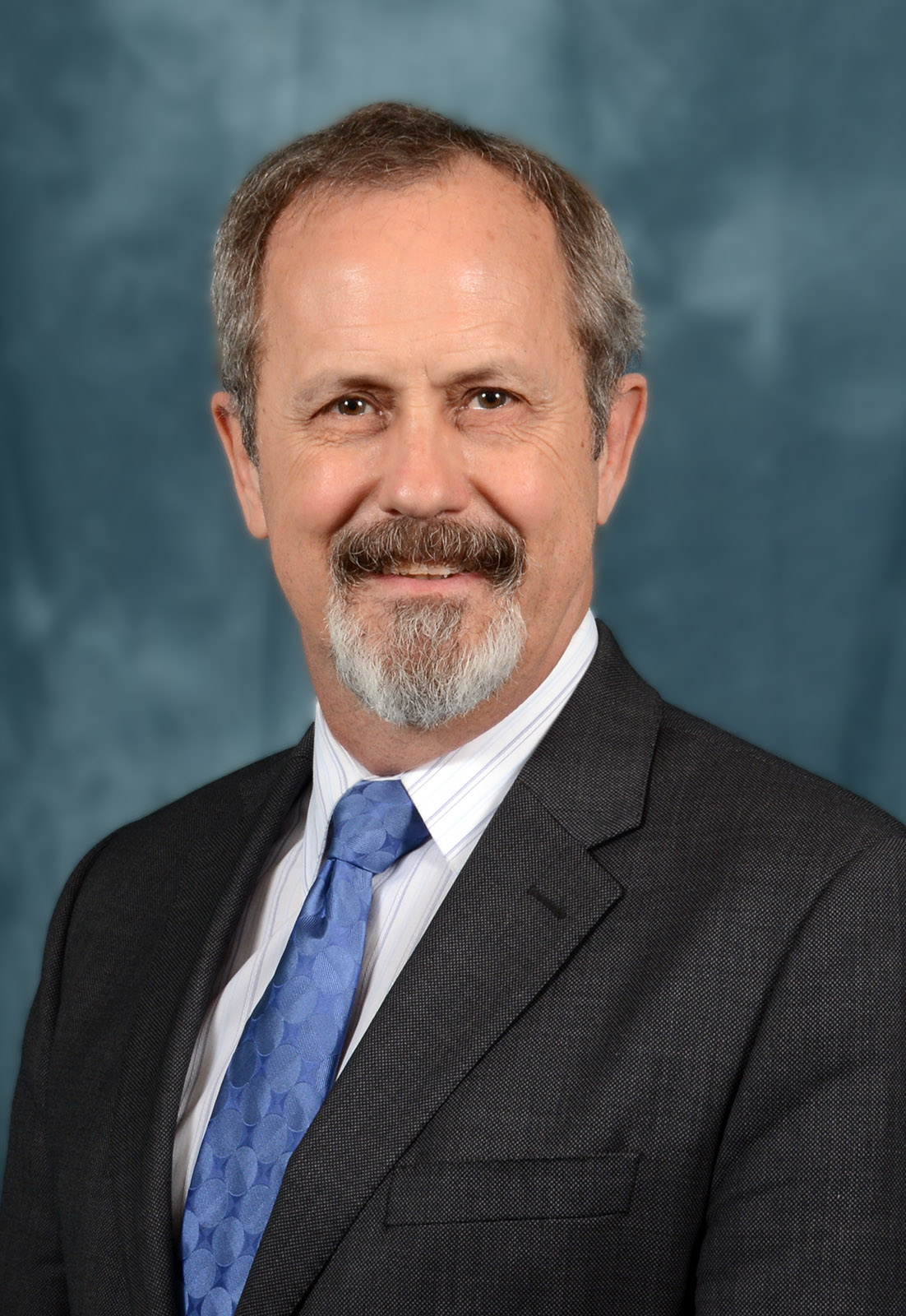
Thomas D. Kirsch, MD (2019)

Thomas Dean Kirsch (born 1957) is an American physician, scientist, and writer whose career has focused on disaster preparedness and response. He has been described as "...an expert in disaster research, planning and response, and disaster and wilderness medicine... both nationally and internationally".

== Personal life and education ==
Kirsch was born in Phoenix, Arizona to E. Eugene Kirsch and Nancy Jane Kirsch, the second of four children. The family moved almost annually during his childhood until settling in Omaha, Nebraska where he attended high school, college, and medical school. His first exposure to a disaster occurred during high school when he volunteered with the American Red Cross after the Omaha tornado.

After graduating from Creighton University in 1980 with a B.A. in fine arts (painting), he then received his medical degree from the University of Nebraska Medical Center in 1984, followed by a master's in public health (M.P.H.) from the Johns Hopkins Bloomberg School of Public Health in 1986. His clinical training included a surgical internship at St. Vincent's Medical Center in New York City (1985); a Preventive Medicine residency at Johns Hopkins (1987) and an emergency medicine residency at the Georgetown/George Washington Universities' Combined program completed in 1990.

Kirsch is married to Celene Domitrovich and has two sons, Thomson M. and William D. He is an avid canyoneer and long-distance hiker who completed a 1,000-mile walk on the Pacific Crest Trail in 2016 and has hiked over 1,000 miles in the Grand Canyon.

== Career ==
Kirsch skipped his medical school graduation ceremony to provide medical care in a Cambodian refugee camp near Aranyaprathet, Thailand during the summer of 1984. As a result switched from a surgical training program to pursue a Masters of Public Health (MPH) Johns Hopkins in preparation for a career in humanitarian response.

World Health Organization (1986–87)

Kirsch worked for the Expanded Program for Immunizations, mostly in South Asia (India, Bangladesh, Bhutan, Myanmar) and the Pacific region (Philippines, Papua New Guinea).

Georgetown/George Washington University Emergency Medicine Residency (1987–90)

Kirsch completed clinical training in emergency medicine because the skills most suited humanitarian and global health work.

Johns Hopkins University (1990-1995)

He joined the faculty of the Department of Emergency Medicine in the School of Medicine and the Department of International Health in the School of Hygiene and Public Health focusing on global emergency medicine and humanitarian response and included work in Trinidad and Tobago, Ethiopia, Bhutan, Cambodia, and Myanmar. He wrote foundational articles on developing emergency medicine training globally.

Michael Reese Hospital and Medical Center, Chicago (1995-1998)

Kirsch served as Chair of Emergency Medicine at Michael Reese, starting the same week as the Chicago heatwave killed more than 700 people. With Dr. Teresita Hogan he co-founded the Resurrection-Michael Reese Emergency Medicine residency (now 'Resurrection Emergency Medicine') in 1997.

Johns Hopkins University (2004-2016)

In 2004 Kirsch returned to Johns Hopkins University, eventually becoming a full professor in 2010 with appointments in the School of Medicine, Bloomberg School of Public Health and Whiting School of Engineering. During that time, he served as the Director of Operations for Emergency Medicine and the Director of the Center for Refugee and Disaster Response (now Center for Humanitarian Health) He taught emergency medicine, disaster medicine and public health and founded the School of Medicine Austere Medicine Course and the Hopkins Hospital Emergency Airway Course. His research focused on better measuring the effect of disaster response using quality-assurance techniques and he worked with engineers to assess the impact of earthquakes on the ability of hospitals to deliver care.

Uniformed Services University (2016-current)

Kirsch became the Director of the National Center for Disaster Medicine and Public Health and as a Professor of Military and Emergency Medicine and Preventive Medicine and Biostatistics. He holds additional academic appointments as an adjunct professor in the George Washington School of Medicine and the Johns Hopkins Bloomberg School of Public Health.

During his career he has worked and consulted for numerous organizations including the Centers for Disease Control, World Health Organization, UNICEF, Pan American Health Organization, Federal Emergency Management Agency, the U.S. Departments of Defense, Health and Human Services, Commerce and State, the American and Canadian Red Cross, the Earthquake Engineering Research Institute and the U.S. Office of Foreign Disaster Assistance.

=== Private sector and family life (1999–2004) ===
He moved to Phoenix, AZ to be near his family as his sons grew, taking a position as Vice President and Medical Director of a hospital management company and serving as faculty with Maricopa Medical Center Emergency Medicine, Phoenix.

== Academic achievements ==
Dr. Kirsch's research was recognized by the American College of Emergency Physicians' first Disaster Medical Science Award in 2013.

He has served both as an editor and/or an editorial board member for the journals Annals of Emergency Medicine, Disaster Medicine and Public Health Preparedness, American Journal of Disaster Medicine, PLoS Current Disasters, and Military Medicine.

He has served on expert panels and spoken widely nationally and internationally to groups including the World Bank, National Academies of Science, Engineering and Medicine, American Medical Association, and Global Competitiveness Forum in settings including Azerbaijan, Berlin, Brussels, Canada, Jerusalem, Riyadh, Taipei, Tel Aviv, Trinidad and Tobago.

As a writer, Kirsch has published over 150 scientific practice and policy articles, book chapters, and a book. He has written numerous editorials, including for the Washington Post and Health Affairs. His creative non-fiction work includes a devastating personal essay on providing care after the Haiti earthquake and a series of articles for the Washington Post of his experience during the Haiti response. In 2020 he published personal essays in The Atlantic, Washington Post and the PCT Communicator.

== Disaster work ==
Kirsch volunteered for the American Red Cross from 1992 to 2017 serving as the Medical Advisor (2000-2010), and on the Scientific Advisory Council (2006-2016). He responded to numerous disasters with the Red Cross including to New York City for the 9-11 terrorist attacks and to New Orleans for Hurricane Katrina.

He has responded many other major disasters as a scientist and health provider including hurricanes Sandy (NYC, 2012), Harvey (Houston, 2017) Haiyan (Philippines, 2013), earthquakes in Haiti (2010), Chile (2010), New Zealand (2011), and Nepal (2015), the Pakistan floods (2010) and the Ebola epidemic in Liberia in 2014-15.

== Awards and honors ==
In 2014 he was recognized by President Obama in a White House ceremony to honor, 'Heroes in Healthcare Fighting Ebola. Following Hurricane Katrina, he testified before both the U.S. Senate and U.S. House of Representatives., Additional awards include:

=== Honors ===
2006 - Fellow (MN'06), The Explorers Club, New York City, NY

2006 - Delta Omega Public Health Honor Society, Alpha Chapter

2012 - Honoree, American Red Cross Day, White House

2014 - Honoree, Heroes in Healthcare Fighting Ebola, President Obama, White House

2018 - Inaugural Address for the Kingfisher Institute, Creighton University

2020 - Keynote speaker, International Preparedness and Response to Emergencies and Disasters (IPRED) meeting, Tel Aviv, Israel

==== Awards ====
1990 - Service Award, District of Columbia Hospital Association

1995 - Disaster Services Professional Service Award, American Red Cross

2013 - Inaugural Disaster Medical Science Award, American College of Emergency Physicians

2013 - 'Most impactful research publication for global emergency medicine.' Society of Academic Emergency Medicine International Committee.

2014 - American Red Cross Clara Barton Honor Award for Voluntary Leadership
