= Teri Manolio =

American epidemiologist and geneticist

- Born: Teri Ann Manolio; United States
- Education: University of Maryland at College Park; University of Maryland at Baltimore; Johns Hopkins School of Hygiene and Public Health
- Known for: Genome-wide association studies Genomic medicine
- Scientific career
- Fields: Epidemiology; Genetics
- Institutions: National Human Genome Research Institute; Uniformed Services University of the Health Sciences
- Thesis: Genetic and environmental factors related to Blomia tropicalis sensitization in asthma (2001)
- Doctoral advisor: Alexander Wilson

Teri Ann Manolio is an American physician, epidemiologist, and geneticist. She is director of the Division of Genomic Medicine at the National Human Genome Research Institute (NHGRI), as well as Professor of Medicine at the Uniformed Services University of the Health Sciences. She is a fellow of the American College of Physicians and of the American Heart Association's Council on Epidemiology. She also has a clinical appointment at the Walter Reed National Military Medical Center in Bethesda, Maryland. Before joining the NHGRI, she worked on large cohort studies, such as the Cardiovascular Health Study and the Framingham Heart Study, at the National Heart, Lung, and Blood Institute.

== Education ==
She attended the University of Maryland at College Park where she received a B.S. in Biochemistry. She went on to earn a M.D. from the University of Maryland at Baltimore in 1980. She went on her earned both a Master of Health Science in Epidemiology and Ph.D. in Human Genetics and Genetics Epidemiology from Johns Hopkins University School of Hygiene and Public Health.

== Career ==
Dr. Manolio spent several years as a medical resident before becoming a medical officer in the Clinical and Genetic Epidemiology Branch at the National Heart, Lung, and Blood Institute (NHLBI) in 1987. In 1994, she became the director of the Epidemiology and Biometry Program at NHLBI. She held the position until 2005 when she became senior advisor and later Director of the Population Genomics Division at the National Human Genome Research Institute (NHGRI) in 2007. She is also affiliated with the Uniformed Services University School of Medicine as a professor of medicine.

== Research ==
She has coauthored 423 journal articles. Her most viewed work, Finding the missing heritability of complex diseases, published in 2006, has over 87,000 accesses. Her work has been cited over 76,000 times. Her research ranges from ethnic disparities in disease risk to the translation of genome discoveries to clinical settings.

== Honors and awards ==
- 2021 Presidential Rank Award: Highest award given to civilian employees at the National Institutes of Health

== Works and publications ==
Manolio TA, Hutter C, Avigan M, Cibotti R, Davis RL, Denny JC, La Grenade L, Wheatley LM, Carrington MN, Chantratita W, Chung WH, Dalton AD, Hung SI, Lee MT, Leeder JS, Lertora JJL, Mahasirimongkol S, McLeod HL, Mockenhaupt M, Pacanowski M, Phillips EJ, Pinheiro S, Pirmohamed M, Sung C, Suwankesawong W, Trepanier L, Tumminia SJ, Veenstra D, Yuliwulandari R, Shear NH. 2018. Research directions in genetically mediated Stevens-Johnson Syndrome/Toxic Epidermal Necrolysis. Clin Pharmacol Ther. 103(3):390-394.

Manolio TA. 2017. Incorporating whole-genome sequencing into primary care: Falling barriers and next steps. Ann Intern Med. 167(3):204-205.

Manolio TA. 2017. In retrospect: A decade of shared genomic associations. Nature. 546(7658):360-361.

Rasmussen-Torvik LJ, Almoguera B, Doheny KF, Freimuth RR, Gordon AS, Hakonarson H, Hawkins J, Ivacic L, Kullo IJ, Linderman MJ, Manolio T, Owusu-Obeng A, Pellegrino R, Prows CA, Pugh E, Ritchie ED, Smith M, Stallings SC, Wolf WA, Zhang K, Scott SA. 2017. Concordance between research sequencing and clinical pharmacogenetic genotyping in the eMERGE PGx study. J Mol Diagn. 19(4):S1525-1578(17)30001-6.

Manolio TA, Fowler DM, Starita LM, Haendel MA, MacArthur DG, Biesecker LG, Worthey E, Chisholm RL, Green ED, Jacob HJ, McLeod HL, Roden D, Rodriguez LL, Williams MS, Cooper GM, Cox NJ, Herman GE, Kingsmore S, Lo C, Lutz C, MacRae CA, Nussbaum RL, Ordovas JM, Ramos EM, Robinson PN, Rubinstein WS, Seidman C, Stranger BE, Wang H, Westerfield M, Built C. 2017. Bedside back to bench: Building bridges between basic and clinical genomic research. Cell. 169(1):6-12.

Bush WS, Crosslin DR, Obeng AO, Wallace J, Almoguera B, Basford MA, Bielinski SJ, Carrell DS, Connolly JJ, Crawford D, Doheny KF, Gallego CJ, Gordon AS, Keating B, Kirby J, Kitchner T, Manzi S, Mejia AR, Pan V, Perry CL, Peterson JF, Prows CA, Ralston J, Scott SA, Scrol A, Smith M, Stallings SC, Veldhuizen T, Wolf W, Volpi S, Wiley K, Li R, Manolio T, Bottinger E, Brilliant ME, Carey D, Chisholm RL, Chute CG, Haines JL, Hakonarson H, Harley JB, Holm IA, Kullo IJ, Jarvik GP, Larson EB, McCarty CA, Williams MS, Denny JC, Rasmussen-Torvik LJ, Roden DM, Ritchie MD. 2016. Genetic variation among 82 pharmacogenes: The PGRN-Seq data from the eMERGE Network. Clin Pharmacol Ther. 100(2):160-169.

Green RC, Goddard KAB, Amendola LM, Appelbaum PS, Berg JS, Bernhardt BA, Biesecker LG, Biswas S, Blout CL, Bowling KM, Brothers KB, Burke W, Caga-Anan CF, Chinnaiyan AM, Chung WK, Clayton EW, Cooper GM, East K, Evans JP, Fullerton SM, Garraway LA, Garrett JR, Gray SW, Henderson GE, Hindorff LA, Holm IA, Lewis MH, Hutter CM, Janne PA, Jarvik GP, Joffe S, Kaufman D, Knoppers BM, Koenig BA, Krantz ID, Manolio T, McCullough L, McEwen J, McGuire A, Muzny D, Myers RM, Nickerson DA, Ou J, Parsons DW, Petersen GM, Plon SE, Rehm HL, Roberts JS, Robinson D, Salama JS, Scollon S, Sharp RR, Shirts B, Spinner NB, Tabor HK, Tarczy-Hornoch P, Veenstra DL, Wagle N, Weck K, Wilfond BS, Wilhelmsen K, Wolf SM, Wynn J, Yu JH, for the CSER Consortium. 2016. The Clinical Sequencing Exploratory Research Consortium: Accelerating the evidence-based practice of genomic medicine. Am J Hum Genet. 98(6):1051-1066.

Weitzel KW, Alexander M, Bernhardt BA, Calman N, Carey DJ, Cavallari LH, Field JR, Hauser D, Junkins HA, Levin PA, Levy K, Madden EB, Manolio TA, Odgis J, Orlando LA, Pyeritz R, Wu R, Shuldiner AR, Bottinger EP, Denny JC, Dexter PR, Flockhart DA, Horowitz CR, Johnson JA, Kimmel SE, Levy MA, Pollin TI, Ginsburg GS. 2016. The IGNITE Network: A model for genomic medicine implementation and research. BMC Med Genomics. 9:1.

Van Driest SL, Wells QS, Stallings S, Bush WS, Gordon A, Nickerson D, Kim JH, Crosslin DR, Jarvik GP, Carrell DS, Ralston J, Larson EB, Bielinski SJ, Olson JE, Ye Z, Kullo IJ, Abul-Husn NS, Scott SA, Bottinger E, Almoguera B, Connolly J, Chiavacci R, Hakonarson H, Rasmussen-Torvik LJ, Pan V, Persell SD, Smith M, Chisholm RL, Kitchner TE, He M, Brilliant MH, Wallace JR, Doheny KF, Shoemaker MB, Li R, Manolio TA, Callis TE, Macaya D, Williams MS, Carey D, Kapplinger JD, Ackerman MJ, Ritchie MD, Denny JC, Roden DM. 2016. Association of arrhythmia-related genetic variants with phenotypes documented in electronic medical records. JAMA. 315(1):47-57.

Manolio TA, Abramowicz M, Al-Mulla F, Anderson W, Balling R, Berger AC, Metspalu A, Meulien P, Miyano S, Naparstek Y, O'Rourke PP, Patrinos GP, Rehm HL, Relling MV, Rennert G, Rodriguez LL, Roden DM, Shuldiner AR, Sinha S, Tan P, Ulfendahl M, Ward R, Williams MS, Wong JEL, Green ED, Ginsburg GS. 2015. Global implementation of genomic medicine: We are not alone. Sci Transl Med. 7(290):290ps13.

Rasmussen-Torvik LJ, Stallings SC, Gordon AS, Almoguera B, Basford MA, Bielinski SJ, Brautbar A, Brilliant M, Carrell DS, Connolly J, Crosslin DR, Doheny KF, Gallego CJ, Gottesman O, Kim DS, Leppig KA, Li R, Lin S, Manzi S, Mejia AR, Pacheco JA, Pan V, Pathak J, Perry CL, Peterson JF, Prows CA, Ralston J, Rasmussen LV, Ritchie MD, Sadhasivam S, Scott SA, Smith M, Vega A, Vinks A, Volpi S, Wolf W, Bottinger E, Chisholm RL, Chute CG, Haines JL, Harley JB, Keating B, Holm IA, Kullo IJ, Jarvik GP, Larson EB, Manolio T, McCarty CA, Nickerson DA, Scherer SE, Williams MS, Roden DM, Denny JC. 2014. Design and anticipated outcomes of the eMERGE-PGx project: A multi-center pilot for pre-emptive pharmacogenomics in electronic health record systems. Clin Pharmacol Ther. 96(4):482-489.

Manolio TA, Murray MF, for the Inter-Society Coordinating Committee on Practitioner Education in Genomics. 2014. The growing role of professional societies in educating clinicians in genomics. Genet Med. 16(7):571-572.

MacArthur DG, Manolio TA, Dimmock DP, Rehm HL, Shendure J, Abecasis GR, Adams DR, Altman RB, Antonarakis SE, Ashley EA, Barrett JC, Biesecker LG, Conrad DF, Cooper GM, Cox NJ, Daly MJ, Gerstein MB, Goldstein DB, Hirschhorn JN, Leal SM, Pennacchio LA, Stamatoyannopoulos JA, Sunyaev SR, Valle D, Voight BF, Winckler W, Gunter C. 2014. Guidelines for investigating causality of sequence variants in human disease. Nature. 508(7497):469-476.

Manolio TA, Green ED. 2014. Leading the way to genomic medicine. Am J Med Genet C Semin Med Genet. 166C(1):1-7.

Ramos EM, Din-Lovinescu C, Berg JS, Brooks LD, Duncanson A, Dunn M, Good P, Hubbard T, Jarvik GP, O'Donnell C, Sherry ST, Aronson N, Biesecker L, Blumberg B, Calonge N, Colhoun HM, Epstein RS, Flicek P, Gordon ES, Green ED, Green RC, Hurles M, Kawamoto K, Knaus W, Ledbetter DH, Levy HP, Lyon E, Maglott D, McLeod HL, Rahman N, Randhawa G, Wicklund C, Manolio TA, Chisholm RL, Williams MS. 2014. Characterizing genetic variants for clinical action. Am J Med Genet C Semin Med Genet. 166C(1):93-104.

Welter D, MacArthur J, Morales J, Burdett T, Hall P, Junkins H, Klemm A, Xu M, Flicek P, Manolio T, Parkinson H, Hindorff L. 2014. The NHGRI GWAS catalog, a curated resource of SNP-trait associations. Nucleic Acids Res. 42(D1):D1001-D1006.

Denny JC, Bastarache L, Ritchie MD, Carroll RJ, Zink R, Mosley JD, Field JR, Pulley JM, Ramirez AH, Bowton E, Basford MA, Carrell D, Peissig PL, Kho AN, Pacheco JA, Rasmussen LV, Crosslin DR, Crane PK, Pathak J, Bielinski SJ, Pendergrass SA, Xu H, Hindorff LA, Li R, Manolio TA, Chute CG, Chisholm RL, Larson EB, Jarvik GP, Brilliant MH, McCarty CA, Kullo IJ, Haines JL, Crawford DC, Masys DR, Roden DM. 2013. Systematic comparison of phenome-wide association study of electronic medical record data and genome-wide association study data. Nat Biotechnol. 31(12):1102-1110.

Manolio TA. 2013. Bringing genome-wide association findings into clinical use. Nat Rev Genet. 14(8):549-558.

Wise AL, Gyi L, Manolio TA. 2013. eXclusion: Toward integrating the X chromosome in genome-wide association analyses. Am J Hum Genet. 92(5):643-647.

Manolio TA, Chisholm RL, Ozenberger B, Roden DM, Williams MS, Wilson R, Bick D, Bottinger EP, Brilliant MH, Eng C, Frazer KA, Korf B, Ledbetter DH, Lupski JR, Marsh C, Mrazek D, Murray MF, O’Donnell PH, Rader D, Relling MV, Shuldiner AR, Valle D, Weinshilboum R, Green ED, Ginsburg GS. 2013. Implementing genomic medicine in the clinic: The future is here. Genet Med. 15(4):258-267.

Ramos EM, Din-Lovinescu C, Bookman E, McNeil LJ, Baker CC, Godynskiy G, Harris EL, Lehner T, McKeon C, Moss J, Starks VL, Sherry S, Manolio TA, Rodriguez LL. 2013. Benefits and risks of NIH controlled data access: Experience of the GAIN Data Access Committee. Am J Hum Genet. 92(4):479-488.

Laurie CC, Laurie CA, Rice K, Doheny KF, Zelnick LR, McHugh CP, Ling H, Hetrick KN, Pugh EW, Amos C, Wei Q, Wang L, Lee JE, Barnes KC, Hansel NN, Mathias R, Daley D, Beaty TH, Scott AF, Ruczinski I, Scharpf RB, Bierut LJ, Hartz SM, Landi MT, Freedman ND, Goldin LR, Ginsburg D, Li J, Desch KC, Strom SS, Blot WJ, Signorello LB, Ingles SA, Chanock SJ, Berndt SI, Le Marchand L, Henderson BE, Monroe KR, Heit JA, de Andrade M, Armasu SM, Regnier C, Lowe WL, Hayes MG, Marazita ML, Feingold E, Murray JC, Melbye M, Feenstra B, Kang JH, Wiggs JL, Jarvik G, McDavid AN, Seshan VE, Mirel DB, Crenshaw A, Sharopova N, Wise A, Shen J, Crosslin DR, Levine DM, Zheng X, Udren JI, Bennett S, Nelson SC, Gogarten SM, Conomos MP, Heagerty P, Manolio T, Pasquale LR, Haiman CA, Caporaso N, Weir BS. 2012. Detectable clonal mosaicism from birth to old age and its relationship to cancer. Nat Genet. 44(6):642-650.

Manolio TA, Chanock SJ. 2012. The riddle of intergenic disease-associated loci. Cell Cycle. 11(1):15-16.

Denny JC, Crawford DC, Ritchie MD, Bielinski SJ, Basford MA, Bradford Y, Chai HS, Zuvich R, Bastarache L, Peissig P, Carrell D, Pathak J, Wilke RA, Rasmussen L, Wang X, Ramirez AH, Pacheco J, Kho A, Weston N, Matsumoto M, Newton KM, Jarvik GP, Li R, Manolio TA, Kullo IJ, Chute CG, Chisolm RL, Larson EB, McCarty CA, Masys DR, Roden DM, de Andrade M. 2011. Variants near FOXE1 are associated with hypothyroidism and other thyroid conditions: Using electronic medical records for genome- and phenome-wide studies. Am J Hum Genet. 89(4):529-542.

Matise TC, Ambite JL, Buyske S, Cole SA, Crawford DC, Haiman CA, Heiss G, Kooperberg C, Le Marchand L, Manolio TA, North KE, Peters U, Ritchie MD, Hindorff LA, Haines JL, for the PAGE Study. 2011. The next PAGE in understanding complex traits: Study design for analysis of Population Architecture using Genetics and Epidemiology. Am J Epidemiol. 174(7):849-859.

TA, Green ED. 2011. Genomics reaches the clinic: From basic discoveries to clinical impact. Cell. 147(1):14-16.

Craig DW, Goor RM, Wang Z, Paschall J, Ostell J, Feolo M, Sherry ST, Manolio TA. 2011. Assessing and managing risk when sharing aggregate genetic variant data. Nat Rev Genet. 12(10):730-736.

Hindorff LA, Gillanders EM, Manolio TA. 2011. Genetic architecture of cancer and other complex diseases: Lessons learned and future directions. Carcinogenesis. 32(7):945-954.

Yang J, Manolio TA, Pasquale LR, Boerwinkle E, Caporaso N, Cunningham JM, de Andrade M, Feenstra B, Feingold E, Hayes MG, Hill WG, Landi MT, Lettre G, Lin P, Ling H, Lowe W, Mathias RA, Melbye M, Pugh E, Cornelis MC, Weir BS, Goddard ME, Visscher PM. 2011. Genome-partitioning of genetic variation for body mass index and height using common SNPs. Nat Genet. 43(6):519-525.

Bookman EB, McAllister K, Gillanders E, Wanke K, Balshaw D, Rutter J, Reedy J, Shaughnessy D, Agurs-Collins T, Paltoo D, Atienza A, Bierut L, Kraft P, Fallin MD, Perrera F, Turkheimer E, Boardman J, Marazita ML, Rappaport SM, Boerwinkle E, Suomi SJ, Caporaso NE, Hertz-Picciotto I, Jacobsen KC, Lowe WL, Goldman LR, Duggal P, Gunnar MR, Manolio TA, Green ED, Olster DH, Birnbaum LS, for the NIH GxE Interplay Workshop participants. 2011. Gene-environment interplay in common complex diseases: Forging an integrative model. Genet Epidemiol. 35(4):217-225.

Manolio TA, Collins FS, Cox NJ, Goldstein DB, Hindorff LA, Hunter DJ, McCarthy MI, Ramos EM, Cardon LR, Chakravarti A, Cho JH, Guttmacher AE, Kong A, Kruglyak L, Mardis E, Rotimi CN, Slatkin M, Valle D, Whittemore AS, Boehnke M, Clark A, Eichler EE, Gibson G, Haines JL, Mackay TFC, McCarroll SA, Visscher PM. 2009. Finding the missing heritability of complex diseases. Nature 461(7265):747-753.

Manolio TA. 2010. Genome-wide association studies and disease risk assessment. N Engl J Med 363(2):166-176.

Manolio TA, Chisholm RL, Ozenberger B, Roden DM, Williams MS, Wilson R, Bick D, Bottinger EP, Brilliant MH, Eng C, Frazer KA, Korf B, Ledbetter DH, Lupski JR, Marsh C, Mrazek D, Murray MF, O’Donnell PH, Rader D, Relling MV, Shuldiner AR, Valle D, Weinshilboum R, Green ED, Ginsburg GS. 2013. Implementing genomic medicine in the clinic: The future is here. Genet Med 15(4):258-267.

Manolio TA. 2013. Bringing genome-wide association findings into clinical use. Nat Rev Genet 14(8):549-558.

Manolio TA, Murray MF, for the Inter-Society Coordinating Committee on Practitioner Education in Genomics. 2014. The growing role of professional societies in educating clinicians in genomics. Genet Med 16(7):571-572.

MacArthur DG, Manolio TA, Dimmock DP, Rehm HL, Shendure J, Abecasis GR, Adams DR, Altman RB, Antonarakis SE, Ashley EA, Barrett JC, Biesecker LG, Conrad DF, Cooper GM, Cox NJ, Daly MJ, Gerstein MB, Goldstein DB, Hirschhorn JN, Leal SM, Pennacchio LA, Stamatoyannopoulos JA, Sunyaev SR, Valle D, Voight BF, Winckler W, Gunter C. 2014. Guidelines for investigating causality of sequence variants in human disease. Nature 508(7497):469-476.

Manolio TA, Abramowicz M, Al-Mulla F, Anderson W, Balling R, Berger AC, et al. 2015. Global implementation of genomic medicine: We are not alone. Sci Transl Med 7(290):290ps13. doi:10.1126/scitranslmed.aaa7909

Manolio TA, Fowler DM, Starita LM, Haendel MA, MacArthur DG, Biesecker LG, Worthey E, Chisholm RL, Green ED, Jacob HJ, McLeod HL, Roden D, Rodriguez LL, Williams MS, Cooper GM, Cox NJ, Herman GE, Kingsmore S, Lo C, Lutz C, MacRae CA, Nussbaum RL, Ordovas JM, Ramos EM, Robinson PN, Rubinstein WS, Seidman C, Stranger BE, Wang H, Westerfield M, Built C. 2017. Bedside back to bench: Building bridges between basic and clinical genomic research. Cell 169(1):6-12.

Manolio TA. 2017. Incorporating whole-genome sequencing into primary care: Falling barriers and next steps. Ann Intern Med 167(3):204-205.

Manolio TA, Hutter C, Avigan M, Cibotti R, Davis RL, Denny JC, La Grenade L, et al. 2017. Research directions in genetically mediated Stevens-Johnson Syndrome/Toxic Epidermal Necrolysis. Clin Pharmacol Ther. [Epub ahead of print] doi:10.1002/cpt.890
