= Carol Romano =

US public health official

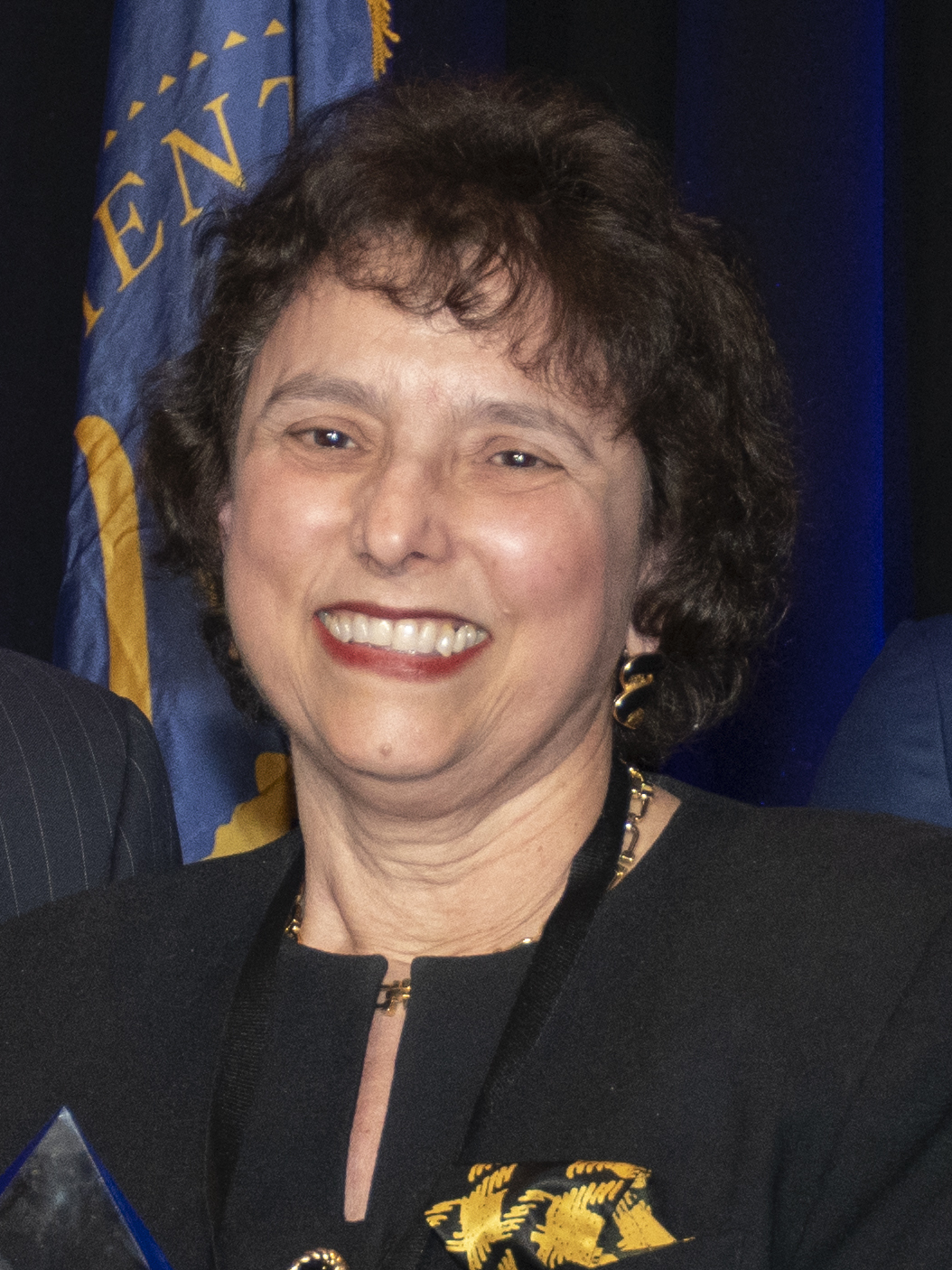

United States Public Health Service Assistant Surgeon General of the United States

Carol Romano is an American public health nurse who is a former Assistant Surgeon General and Chief Nursing Officer for the United States Public Health Service (PHS). Romano holds the rank of Rear Admiral in the United States Public Health Service Commissioned Corps. In 2011, she became associate dean of Academic Affairs for the Uniformed Services University of the Health Sciences Graduate School of Nursing.

Her awards from the PHS include the Meritorious Service Medal, three Outstanding Service Medals, and a Commendation Medal and two Achievement Medals.
