= Noreen A. Hynes =

American infectious disease physician

- Education: Seton Hall University; Uniformed Services University of the Health Sciences; Johns Hopkins School of Hygiene and Public Health; London School of Hygiene and Tropical Medicine
- Scientific career
- Fields: Vaccine preventable diseases, tropical disease epidemiology
- Workplaces: Johns Hopkins School of Medicine

Noreen A. Hynes is an American infectious disease physician specializing in vaccine preventable diseases and the epidemiology and control of tropical diseases. She is an associate professor of medicine at the Johns Hopkins School of Medicine.

== Life ==
Hynes completed a B.S.N. at Seton Hall University. She completed a M.D. at the Uniformed Services University of the Health Sciences in 1985. At the Massachusetts General Hospital, she conducted an internship in internal medicine from 1985 to 1986 and a residency in internal medicine from 1988 to 1989. From 1989 to 1990, Hynes completed a fellowship in infectious disease at the Massachusetts General Hospital, Brigham and Women's Hospital, and the Harvard Medical School. She earned a M.P.H. from the Johns Hopkins School of Hygiene and Public Health. She completed a diploma in tropical medicine and hygiene from the Royal College of Physicians and the London School of Hygiene and Tropical Medicine.

Hynes was the deputy assistant secretary for public health emergency preparedness at the United States Department of Health and Human Services. Hynes joined the faculty at the Johns Hopkins University in 1997. She is an associate professor of medicine at the Johns Hopkins School of Medicine. She is its director of the geographic medicine center of the division of infectious diseases, medical director of the tropical medicine ambulatory consultation service, and director of research of the biocontainment unit at the Johns Hopkins Hospital. She specializes in vaccine preventable diseases and the epidemiology and control of tropical diseases.
