= Uniformed Services University of the Health Sciences =

Federal government university in Bethesda, Maryland, US

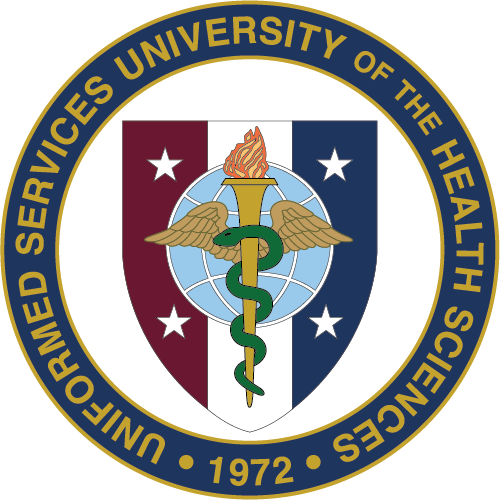
- Motto: "Learning to Care For Those In Harm's Way"
- Type: Federal health science
- Established: 1972
- Accreditation: MSCHE
- Affiliations: United States Army; United States Navy; United States Air Force; United States Coast Guard; U.S. Public Health Service Commissioned Corps
- Academic affiliations: CUWMA
- President: Jonathan Woodson
- Academic staff: 1,087 (775 civilians; 312 military); More than 4,000 off-campus
- Students: >
- Undergraduates: > 5,000
- Postgraduates: About 1,200
- Location: Bethesda, Maryland, United States; 39.0012°N 77.0859°W
- Campus: Suburban
- Colors: Purple, gold and white
- Mascot: Bald Eagle
- Website: usuhs.edu
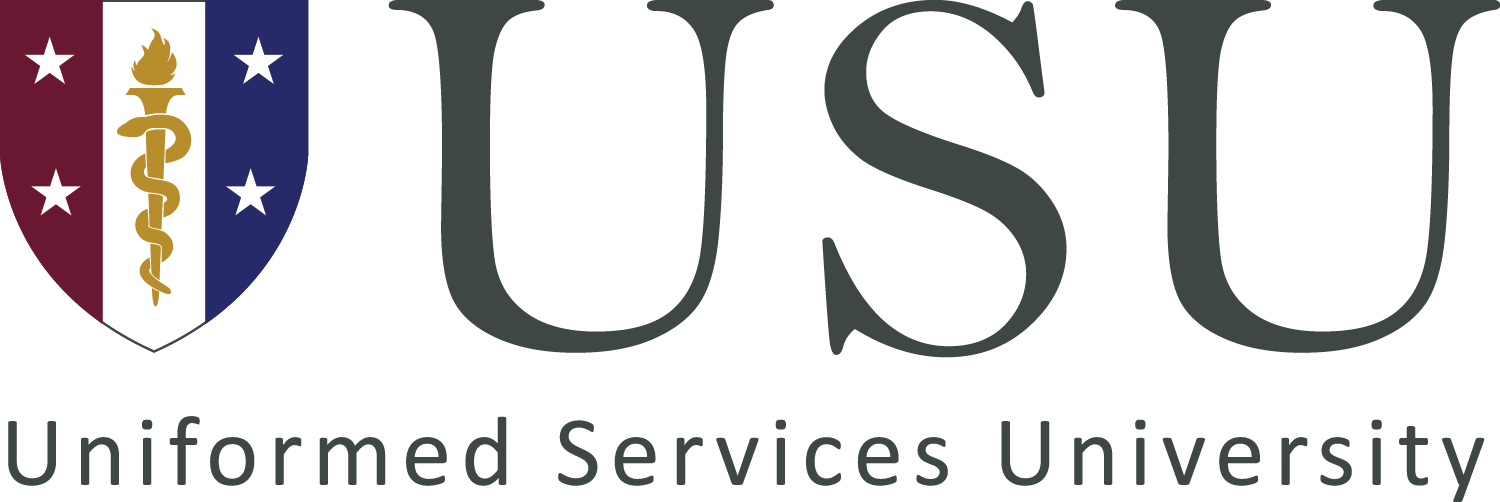

The Uniformed Services University of the Health Sciences (USU) is a health science university and professional school of the U.S. federal government. The primary mission of the school is to prepare graduates for service to the U.S. at home and abroad as uniformed health professionals, scientists and leaders; by conducting cutting-edge, military-relevant research; by leading the Military Health System in key functional and intellectual areas; and by providing operational support to units around the world.

The university consists of the F. Edward Hébert School of Medicine, a medical school, which includes a full health sciences graduate education program, the Daniel K. Inouye Graduate School of Nursing, the Postgraduate Dental College, and the College of Allied Health Sciences. The university's main campus is located in Bethesda, Maryland. USU was established in 1972 under legislation sponsored by U.S. representative Felix Edward Hébert of Louisiana. It graduated its first class in 1980. USU is accredited by the Commission of Education, Middle States Association of Colleges and Schools.

Uniformed Services University falls under the office of the Assistant Secretary of Defense for Health Affairs.

== Programs ==
The university is similar to a federal service academy, such as the United States Military Academy, Naval Academy, Air Force Academy, United States Merchant Marine Academy, and United States Coast Guard Academy, and the Senior Military Colleges, such as National War College or Dwight D. Eisenhower School for National Security and Resource Strategy. Students are members of the uniformed services of the United States and receive an education in exchange for a service commitment after graduation.

All medical students enter the university as commissioned officers via direct commissions in the pay grade of O-1 or rank of second lieutenant in the U.S. Army or U.S. Air Force, or ensign in the U.S. Navy, the U.S. Coast Guard, or the U.S. Public Health Service. No prior military service is required for admission to USU's medical school. Students who already hold military commissions at higher rank in the Army, Air Force, Coast Guard, and Navy are required to accept temporary administrative demotion to O-1 for medical school; officers of the U.S. Marine Corps, U.S. Space Force, or National Oceanic and Atmospheric Administration Commissioned Corps must resign their existing commissions and accept commissions in as O-1s in one of the other three authorized services.

Prior military service students in the Graduate School of Nursing or School of Medicine PhD programs may keep their officer rank, or will be commissioned as O-1 if previously enlisted.

Students pay no tuition or fees and receive the full salary and benefits of a uniformed military officer throughout their time at the university. In return, all military students incur an active duty commitment proportionate to their time at USU. Medical students have a minimum of a seven-year active duty service commitment and a six-year inactive ready reserve commitment following their internship and residency after graduation.

Students in the School of Medicine graduate programs are a mix of both civilians and uniformed officers of various ranks. They also pay no tuition or fees. Civilian students may receive stipends and uniformed graduate students continue to receive their active-duty pay and benefits while attending school at USU. The Graduate School of Nursing students are all active duty uniformed military nurses or nurses in federal civilian service. Neither pay tuition or fees at USU and both uniformed graduate students and nursing students maintain their rank and continue to receive their regular salaries while students at the university.

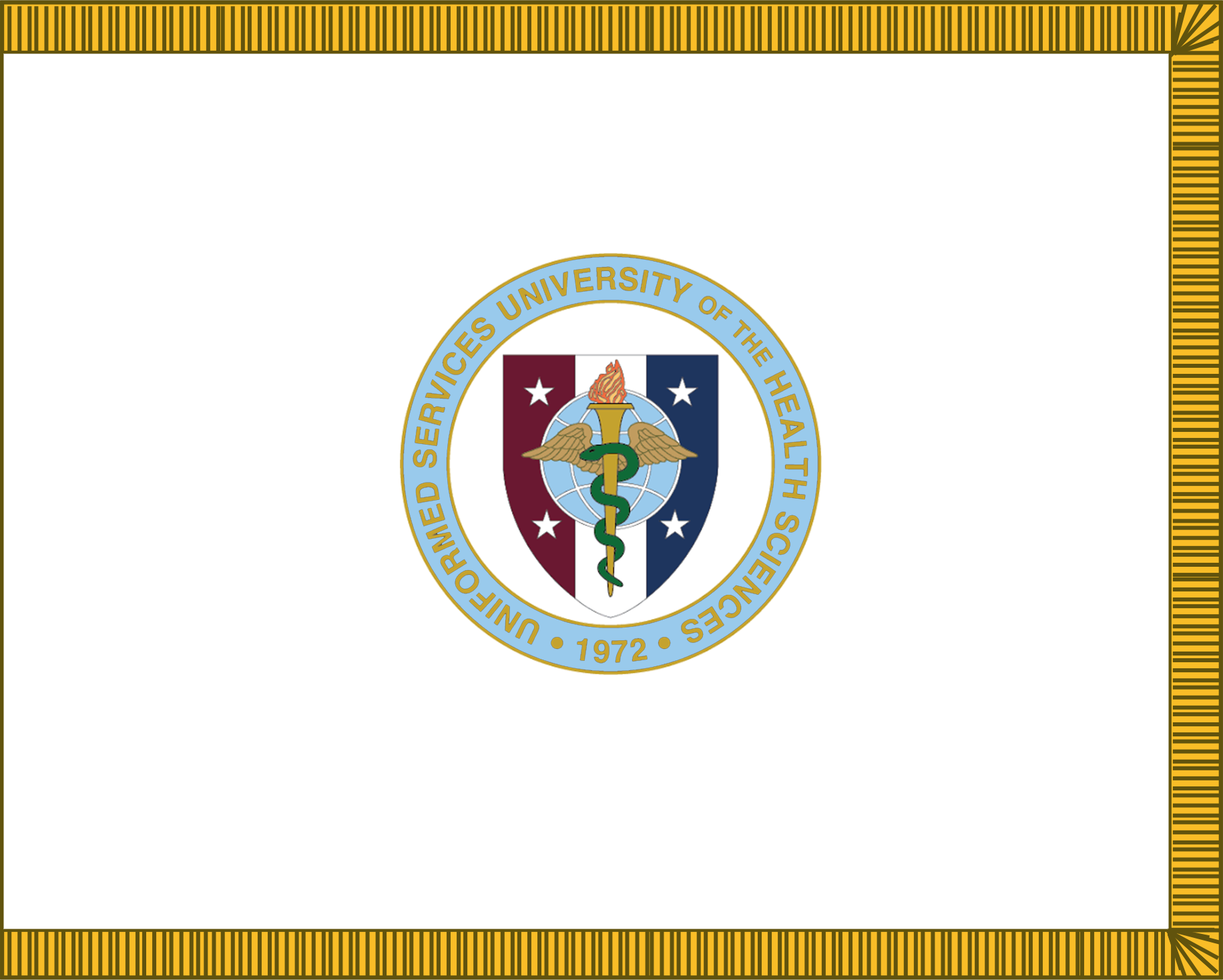
Uniformed Services University of Health Sciences Flag

The postgraduate dental college offers a Master of Science in Oral Biology degree to students enrolled in selected graduate dental education programs of the Army, Air Force, and Navy. USU is one of many federal service graduate-level professional schools such as the Naval Postgraduate School, which has several Master of Science and Ph.D. programs.

The College of Allied Health Sciences (CAHS) is the newest college, established in 2017. It currently offers an Associate of Science and Bachelor of Science degrees to students at six different locations who opt to enroll in CAHS after enrolling in their Service required training program.

== School of Medicine ==
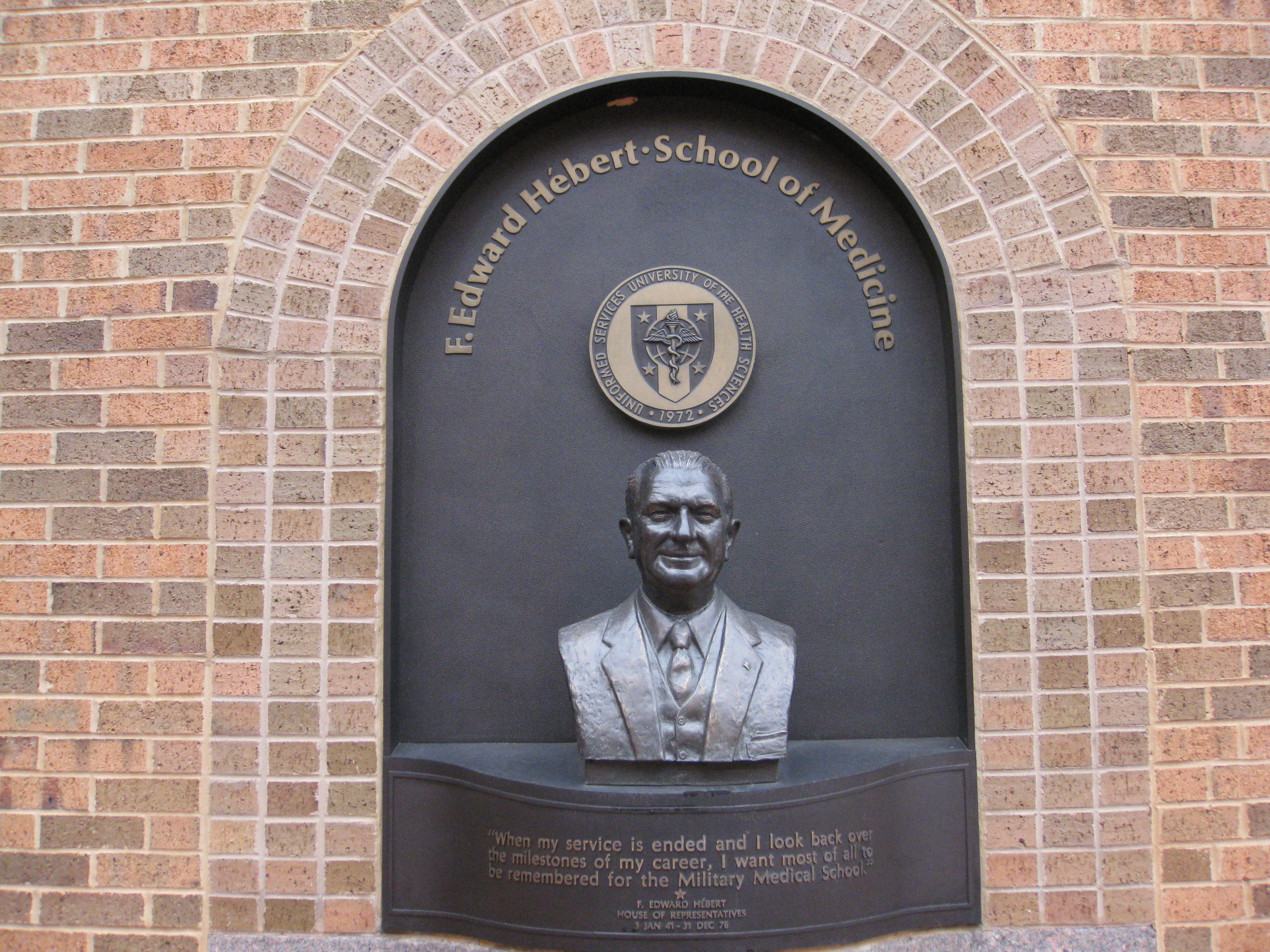
The medical college is named after Louisiana Congressman F. Edward Hebert, one of the longest serving members in the U.S. House of Representatives (1941–1977). Hebert was instrumental in the founding of USU in 1972.

With an average enrollment of approximately 170 students per class, the F. Edward Hébert School of Medicine is located in Bethesda, Maryland on the military installation of Naval Support Activity Bethesda (NSAB), sharing NSAB with the Walter Reed National Military Medical Center and is located along Maryland Route 355, across from the National Institutes of Health. The school is named in honor of former U.S. Representative Felix Edward Hébert.

Typically, the first-year class is composed of 63 Army students, 51 Air Force students, 51 Navy students, and two Public Health Service students. The Class of 2010 increased the Public Health Service student number to six. The Class of 2025 saw the first U.S. Coast Guard student graduate. Students attending this institution receive free tuition, as well as reimbursement for all fees. They also receive salaries and benefits as junior officers. Textbooks are issued to the students at the beginning of each semester.

USU School of Medicine students are all active-duty uniformed officers during their schooling and receive pay and benefits at the grade of O-1 (second lieutenant for the Army and Air Force and ensign for the Navy, Coast Guard, and Public Health Service) – unless the student was prior service at a higher rank then that student will wear the O-1 rank but be paid at their previous pay grade. Upon graduation, medical students are promoted to the grade of O-3, (captain for the Army and Air Force, lieutenant for the Navy, Coast Guard, and Public Health Service), and are expected to serve at least seven years after residency on active duty and six years in the inactive ready reserve. Students graduating from the School of Medicine receive four years' credit toward military retirement once 20 years has been reached through military graduate medical education (residency/fellowship), practicing, and prior-service (if applicable).

When the school was first formed, the United States Congress weighed whether to make each student a cadet or midshipman (like the military service academies) or to give students full active-duty officer status and promotion benefits. A compromise was reached whereby medical students were commissioned as O-1 grade officers, were not promoted while enrolled in the School of Medicine, and do not receive time in grade or time in service while enrolled in USU. However, this status puts USU Medical Students in a unique position; unlike the Graduate School of Nursing and other programs, School of Medicine students are barred from promotion. Additionally, prior-service commissioned officers must accept a demotion to O-1 in order to matriculate. Upon graduation, when these officers are promoted to O-3, half of the time spent in prior active duty service is then added to their time-in-service (TIS)/time-in-grade (TIG) and used toward promotion to the rank of major or lieutenant commander (O-4). However, as of 2008, prior service officers will be paid their former base pay while attending School of Medicine.

The curriculum at the School of Medicine begins with 1.5 years of basic sciences organized into organ-system based modules called "Molecules to Military Medicine". Additional courses include Parasitology, Combat Medical Skills, Military Medical History, Officer Professional Development, Military Applied Physiology, Epidemiology, and several other courses. The clerkship year begins in January of the second year, and is followed by the USMLE Step 1. After Step 1, students participate in an integrated advanced didactic module, "Bench to Bedside and Beyond", and then begin fourth year clerkships/subinternships. These clerkships are done at various military hospitals across the country.

Approximately 80 percent of military physicians reaching 20 or more years of military service are graduates of USU. A majority of medical corps leadership positions are occupied by graduates of USU. Graduates also make up a majority of Army Special Forces physicians.

USU is featured in the documentary Fighting for Life.

Affiliated military and civilian teaching hospitals are:

- Walter Reed National Military Medical Center, Bethesda, MD
- Malcolm Grow Medical Center, Andrews AFB, MD
- Northern Virginia Mental Health Institute, Falls Church, VA (civilian)
- St. Elizabeth's Hospital, Washington, D.C. (civilian)
- Washington Hospital Center, Washington, D.C. (civilian)
- DeWitt Army Community Hospital, Fort Belvoir, VA
- Portsmouth Naval Hospital, Portsmouth, VA
- Naval Hospital, Camp Lejeune, NC
- Eisenhower Army Medical Center, Fort Gordon, GA
- Darnall Army Medical Center, Fort Cavazos, TX
- Wilford Hall Medical Center, Lackland AFB, TX
- Wright-Patterson Medical Center, Wright-Patterson AFB, OH
- Madigan Army Medical Center, Tacoma, WA
- Tripler Army Medical Center, Honolulu, HI
- Brooke Army Medical Center, Fort Sam Houston, TX
- David Grant USAF Medical Center, Travis AFB, CA
- 96th Medical Group, Eglin AFB, FL
- Martin Army Community Hospital, Fort Benning, GA
- Womack Army Medical Center, Fort Bragg, NC
- Naval Hospital Jacksonville, Naval Air Station Jacksonville, FL
- Bob Wilson Naval Hospital, San Diego, CA
- Naval Hospital Camp Pendleton, Camp Pendleton, CA
- Naval Hospital Pensacola, Pensacola, FL

=== Combined MD/PhD Program ===
Students can indicate their intent to apply for the MD/PhD program on the USU secondary application and complete the graduate school application. Applicants not selected for the graduate school are still eligible for acceptance into the medical school. The combined MD/PhD program requires the same military commitment as the school of medicine. Three MD/PhD degrees are currently offered; neuroscience (NES), molecular and cell biology (MCB), and emerging infectious diseases (EID). Students remain civilian until graduate school requirements are completed. Degrees are not granted until completion of both graduate and medical requirements.

=== Graduate programs ===
The graduate programs in biomedical sciences and public health in the School of Medicine are open to civilian and military applicants. Civilian students may apply to most of these programs. The faculty is composed of a mix of military and civilian professors. There is no tuition, stipends are guaranteed for three years, and no military service is required after graduation for civilian PhD students. There also is no undergraduate teaching.

The graduate program at USU currently has approximately 170 full-time graduate students.

USU currently offers the Ph.D. in emerging infectious diseases, medical and clinical psychology, molecular and cellular biology, neuroscience, Public Health, Environmental Health Sciences and Medical Zoology.

USU also offers master's degree programs in healthcare administration and policy, health professions education, public health and tropical medicine and hygiene.

There are military students in the graduate programs, most notably the public health and tropical medicine programs and clinical psychology program. Generally, military students were in the military before beginning their graduate training, but some commission as they enter their programs.

=== Enlisted to Medical Degree Preparatory Program (EMDP2) ===
The Enlisted to Medical Degree Preparatory Program (EMDP2) program is a two-year, full-time education program for enlisted members of the military to prepare for medical school applications. It is intended for motivated service members who show academic promise and whose experiences and goals align with the mission of their military services and the F. Edward Hebert School of Medicine. Selectees are assigned to USU (requires a permanent change of station to Bethesda, MD) and placed in a supportive academic setting for a two-year period.

EMDP2 includes premedical coursework, Medical College Admissions Test (MCAT) preparation, clinical experience, mentoring, and pre-health career advising. EMDP2's current civilian partner institution, George Mason University (GMU), provides the coursework, MCAT preparation courses, and pre-health advising on a contract basis. These services are currently provided at GMU's Science and Technology Campus (Manassas, VA) in an exclusive cohort structure. USU coordinates the clinical component, which is completed at Walter Reed National Military Medical Center, Fort Belvoir Community Hospital, and Malcolm Grow Medical Center at Andrews Air Force Base.

The EMDP2's first year is designed to prepare students from any academic and career background to take the MCAT exam. The curriculum starts with fundamental coursework and expands into a full pre-medical curriculum. Students typically take the MCAT and begin medical school applications near the end of EMDP2 year one. Upon completing EMDP2 year one, students are awarded a Post-Baccalaureate Certificate in Pre-Medicine from GMU.

The EMDP2's second year is designed to expand the student's understanding of medical and biological concepts. Coursework covers anatomy, microbiology, neurology, genetics, etc., to ensure EMDP2 students are well-prepared to matriculate into medical school. Upon completing EMDP2 year two, students are awarded a Graduate Certificate in Cell and Molecular Biology from GMU.

EMDP2 students may seek approval to take six additional courses to fulfill the GMU requirements for a Master of Science in Biology.

After completing the second year, gaining acceptance into a medical school, and fulfilling requirements for commissioning, students will have successfully completed the EMDP2. They will then matriculate into medical school at USU or a civilian school and earn an commission.

== Graduate School of Nursing ==
The Graduate School of Nursing offers two Advanced Practice Degrees: a Master of Science in Nursing (MSN), and a Doctor of Nursing Practice (DNP) degree in five different APRN specialty options: Family Nurse Practitioner, Certified Registered Nurse Anesthesia, Adult Gerontology Clinical Nurse Specialist, Psychiatric Mental Health Nurse Practitioner, Women's Health Nurse Practitioner, as well as a Ph.D. in nursing science.

The Graduate School of Nursing offers a Master of Science in Nursing degree programs in nurse anesthesia, family nurse practitioner, perioperative clinical nursing, Psychiatric Mental Health Nurse Practitioner, and full- and part-time programs for a Ph.D. in nursing sciences.

The Masters of Nursing Science and Doctor of Nursing Practice degrees at USU are accredited by the Commission on Collegiate Nursing Education, and The Nurse Anesthesia Program is fully accredited by the Council on Accreditation of Nurse Anesthesia Educational Programs (COA). Over 800 APRNs and Nurse Scientists have graduated from the GSN since 1995, and the overall certification pass rate exceeds 99% with an impressive first time pass rate of over 95%.

== Post Graduate Dental College ==
The Post Graduate Dental College (PDC) is a degree-granting institution for active-duty personnel enrolled in branch-specific dental programs. Students of the branch-specific dental programs are required to complete a research project on top of their studies in order to earn a degree from PDC.

Only students enrolled in branch-specific dental programs are eligible to apply.

== College of Allied Health Sciences ==
The College of Allied Health Sciences was established in 2017, responding to the National Defense Authorization Act which modified USU's authorities to include undergraduate and other medical education and training programs. These programs ensure military medicine remains on the cutting edge of providing a "Ready Medical Force" to support the American Warfighter and the Department of Defense (DoD) community around the world. These programs also provide a recruiting and retention advantage for the Services by providing valuable skill sets that can be used when servicemembers to transition into civilian life.

Currently, the CAHS supports Army, Navy and Air Force Medical Enlisted Services across a wide range of education and training requirements. Current enrolment across the programs exceeds 7,000 students per year. Only students enrolled in specific Military Occupational Specialty (MOS) / Navy Enlisted Code (NEC) / Air Force Specialty Code (AFSC) / Additional Skill Identifier (ASI) training programs of the Services are eligible for enrollment. Depending on specifics of the respective program, the Servicemember is enrolled into either an Associate of Science Health Science (ASHS) or Bachelor of Science Health Science (BSHS) program. The technical training received by the Servicemember constitutes the discipline with the majority of General Education required for the respective degree coming via transfer credit. The CAHS does not teach courses beyond those offered to a Servicemember who enlisted for a specific MOS/NEC/AFSC and attend the respective Service school.

Service Affiliated Locations an programs include:

=== Medical Education & Training Campus, JBSA-Fort Sam Houston (Branch Campus) ===
Program Degree Level Participating Service(s)

- Public Health (ASHS) (Army / Navy)
- Medical Laboratory Technician (ASHS) (Army / Navy)
- Histology Technician (ASHS) (Navy / Air Force)
- Urology Technician (ASHS) (Navy / Air Force)
- Neurodiagnostic Technician (ASHS) (Navy / Air Force)
- Occupational Therapy Assistant (ASHS) (Army / Navy)
- Radiological Technologist (ASHS) (Army / Navy / Air Force)
- Respiratory Therapy (ASHS) (Army / Navy)
- Cardiovascular Technician (ASHS) (Navy)
- Respiratory Care Practitioner (ASHS) (Air Force)
- Ophthalmic Technician (ASHS) (Army / Air Force)
- Pharmacy Technician (ASHS) (Army / Navy / Air Force)
- Nuclear Medical Technologist (BSHS) (Navy / Air Force)
- Nutrition Care (Certificate) (Army / Air Force)
- Hospital Corpsman Basic (Certificate) (Navy)

=== US Army Medical Center of Excellence JBSA-Fort Sam Houston (Additional Location) ===
Program Degree Level Participating Service(s)

- Combat Paramedic (ASHS) (Army)
- Health Physics Technician (ASHS) (Army)

=== Joint Special Operations Medical Training Center, Fort Bragg, NC (Additional Location) ===
Program Degree Level Participating Service(s)

- SOF Paramedic (ASHS) (Army / Navy)
- Adv. Tactical Provider (BSHS) (Army / Navy)
- Global Community Health (BSHS) (Army)

=== Naval Medical Forces Support Command, JBSA-Fort Sam Houston ===
==== *Naval Undersea Medical Institute, Groton, CT (Other Instructional Site) ====
Program Degree Level Participating Service(s)

- Independent Duty Corpsman (BSHS) (Navy)
- Radiation Health Protection (ASHS) (Navy)

==== *Surface Warfare Medical Institute, San Diego, CA (Other Instructional Site) ====
Program Degree Level Participating Service(s)

- Independent Duty Corpsman (BSHS) (Navy)

==== *Tri-Service Opticianry School, Yorktown, VA (Other Instructional Site) ====
Program Degree Level Participating Service(s)

- Opticianry Technician (ASHS) (Army / Navy)

== USU Centers ==
USU is home to many different research Centers and Institutes, which help advance the university's education and public service missions.

== Notable people ==
=== Alumni ===
- Thomas W. Travis - 21st Surgeon General of the United States Air Force
- Telita Crosland - 4th Director Defense Health Agency
- Joseph Caravalho, Jr. – physician, Joint Staff surgeon, the chief medical advisor to the Chairman of the Joint Chiefs of Staff, CEO and President of the Henry M. Jackson Foundation for the Advancement of Military Medicine
- Lorenzo Cohen - professor in the Department of General Oncology and Behavioral Science and the director of the Integrative Medicine Program at the University of Texas MD Anderson Cancer Center
- Rhonda Cornum – U.S. Army brigadier general
- C. Forrest Faison III - 38th Surgeon General of the United States Navy
- Paul A. Friedrichs - United States Air Force major general serving as the command surgeon of the Joint Staff.
- Bruce L. Gillingham - 39th Surgeon General of the United States Navy
- Nicholas Grosso – President of the Centers for Advanced Orthopedics, the largest private orthopedic group in the United States
- Nidal Hasan – graduate, and later convicted as a domestic terrorist for murder in the 2009 Fort Hood shooting.
- Jamie Lee Henry (M.D.) – internist in the United States Army Medical Corps and first openly transgender officer in the United States Armed Forces
- Noreen A. Hynes (M.D. 1985) – infectious disease specialist, associate professor of medicine at the Johns Hopkins School of Medicine, and former deputy assistant secretary for public health emergency preparedness at the United States Department of Health and Human Services
- Robert Kadlec - Assistant Secretary of Health and Human Services (Preparedness and Response) from August 2017 until January 2021.
- Eleanor Mariano – White House Doctor (1993–2001)
- Robert I. Miller - 24th Surgeon General of the United States Air Force (also serving as SG of the US Space force)
- Andrew R. Morgan – NASA astronaut
- Sean L. Murphy - Deputy Surgeon General of the United States Air Force
- Kobi Peleg - Israeli professor of Emergency and Disaster Management at Tel-Aviv University, and formerly director of the Israel National Center for Trauma & Emergency Medicine Research
- Peter M. Rhee – physician to Arizona Congresswoman Gabby Giffords and the other patients in the 2011 Tucson shooting.
- Francisco Rubio – NASA astronaut
- David Sachar - 82d ABN Battalion Surgeon, Gastroenterologist at Atrium Health
- Erica Schwartz - U.S. Public Health Service Commissioned Corps rear admiral, deputy surgeon general of the United States from January 2019 to April 2021.

=== Faculty and staff ===
- Everett Alvarez, Jr. – longtime chairman and member of the school's Board of Regents, retired Navy Commander who was the second-longest held POW in United States military history.
- John D. Boice Jr. - American radiation epidemiologist and health physicist.
- Patrick DeLeon – distinguished professor, past president of the American Psychological Association and former chief of staff for Senator Daniel Inouye
- William DeVries – professor of anatomy – performed the first successful permanent artificial heart implantation.
- Nancy E. Gary - president and chief executive officer of the Educational Commission for Foreign Medical Graduates, executive vice president of the USUHS and dean of F. Edward Hébert School of Medicine
- Mark Geier - former physician and controversial professional witness in the area of Thiomersal and vaccines
- Jessica Gill - Nurse scientist working as a Bloomberg Distinguished Professor of Trauma Recovery Biomarkers in the department of neurology at the Johns Hopkins School of Nursing and School of Medicine
- Franziska Grieder - director of the Office of Research Infrastructure Programs at the National Institutes of Health
- Durward Gorham Hall - six-term U.S. representative from Missouri's 7th congressional district and co-founder and a member of board of trustees of USUHS.
- Robert J. T. Joy – founding Commandant of Students, Chair of Medical History, and eminent military medical historian
- Katalin Karikó - Nobel Prize Winner in Physiology or Medicine 2023. Postdoctoral researcher, Department of Pathology, 1988–1989
- Stephen I. Katz - Director of the National Institute of Arthritis and Musculoskeletal and Skin Diseases
- Arthur Kellermann – Dean of the medical school since 2013, member of the National Academy of Medicine
- Thomas D. Kirsch – Physician and assistant professor of biostatistics, Director of the National Center for Disaster Medicine and Public Health.
- Steven Libutti - Director of the Rutgers Cancer Institute of New Jersey
- Marguerite Littleton Kearney - Director of the National Institute of Nursing Research's Division of Extramural Science Programs
- Teri Manolio - Director of the Division of Genomic Medicine at the National Human Genome Research Institute
- Brian P. Monahan - Attending Physician of the United States Congress and the United States Supreme Court
- Loren Mosher - Chief of the Center for Studies of Schizophrenia in the National Institute of Mental Health (1968–1980)
- Bonnie Burnham Potter - First female physician in the Navy Medical Corps to be selected for flag rank
- Walter Reich - 2003 recipient of the AAAS Award for Scientific Freedom and Responsibility
- Carol Romano - Former Assistant Surgeon General and Chief Nursing Officer for the United States Public Health Service
- Jay P. Sanford – founding Dean of the medical school in 1975, resigned in 1990; original author of Sanford's Guide to Antimicrobial Therapy
- Barbara Stoll - H. Wayne Hightower Distinguished Professor in the Medical Sciences, Professor of Pediatrics and former Dean at the University of Texas Health Science Center at Houston.
- Sandra M. Swain - Oncologist, breast cancer specialist and clinical translational researcher
- Craig B. Thompson - cell biologist and a former president of the Memorial Sloan Kettering Cancer Center
- Alonzo Smythe Yerby - Associate Dean of the Harvard School of Public Health

== See also ==
- Health Professions Scholarship Program
