= Franziska Grieder =

Swiss-American veterinary scientist

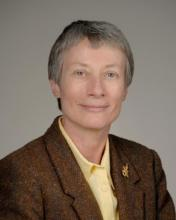
- Born: Dayton, Ohio
- Education: University of Zurich (D.V.M.); University of Wisconsin–Madison (M.S., Ph.D.)
- Scientific career
- Workplaces: Uniformed Services University of the Health Sciences; Office of Research Infrastructure Programs

Franziska B. Grieder is a Swiss-American veterinary scientist. She is the director of the Office of Research Infrastructure Programs at the National Institutes of Health. Grieder was a faculty member and researcher at the Uniformed Services University of the Health Sciences.

== Early life and education ==
Born in Dayton, Ohio, Grieder grew up in Switzerland and received her doctorate in veterinary medicine from the University of Zurich. She earned her M.S. and Ph.D. in viral pathogenesis at the University of Wisconsin–Madison, and conducted postdoctoral research on the Venezuelan equine encephalitis virus (VEE) at the University of North Carolina at Chapel Hill.

== Career ==
Beginning in 1993, Grieder joined the faculty and conducted research at the medical school of the Uniformed Services University of the Health Sciences (USU) within the Department of Microbiology and Immunology, and Molecular/Cell Biology and Neuroscience in Bethesda, Maryland. Her areas of expertise include viral-induced neuroimmunology and neurodegeneration, emerging viral threats and the molecular genetics of the VEE virus. In 2000, at the National Center for Research Resources (NCRR), Grieder began managing the Division of Comparative Medicine's Laboratory Animal Sciences Program, where she created the Mutant Mouse Regional Resource Centers Program and supervised grants related to mammalian models, comparative and functional genomics, and training opportunities for veterinarians and veterinary students. Grieder joined the National Institutes of Health (NIH) in 2000 as a program official in the Division of Comparative Medicine, which was located in the former National Center for Research Resources (NCRR). She was appointed director of the division in 2004, with responsibilities that include the management and oversight of the eight national primate research centers, primate breeding and resource-related projects, development of mammalian and non-mammalian animal model resources, pre- and post-doctoral training for veterinarians, and a variety of research projects. From July 2012 to January 2013, Grieder served as the acting director of the Office of Research Infrastructure Programs (ORIP). She became the director of ORIP on January 13, 2013. She continues to serve as an adjunct faculty in the Department of Pathology and Program of Neuroscience at USU. At USU, her research focused on viral pathogenesis using mouse models to investigate neuroimmune mechanisms.

She has written numerous articles and book chapters for scientific publications, and her research has appeared in peer-reviewed journals including Virology, Journal of Immunology and Nature Genetics.

== Selected publications ==
- Grieder, Franziska B.; Davis, Nancy L.; Aronson, Judith F.; Charles, Peter C.; Sellon, Debra C.; Suzuki, Kinuko; Johnston, Robert E. (1995). "Specific Restrictions in the Progression of Venezuelan Equine Encephalitis Virus-Induced Disease Resulting from Single Amino Acid Changes in the Glycoproteins". Virology. 206 (2): 994–1006. doi:10.1006/viro.1995.1022. PMID 7856110.
- Grieder, Franziska B.; Vogel, Stefanie N. (1999). "Role of Interferon and Interferon Regulatory Factors in Early Protection against Venezuelan Equine Encephalitis Virus Infection". Virology. 257 (1): 106–118. doi:10.1006/viro.1999.9662. PMID 10208925.
- Austin, C. P.; Battey, J. F.; Bradley, A.; Bucan, M.; Capecchi, M.; Collins, F. S.; Dove, W. F.; Duyk, G.; Dymecki, S.; Eppig, J. T.; Grieder, F. B.; Heintz, N.; Hicks, G.; Insel, T. R.; Joyner, A.; Koller, B. H.; Lloyd, K. C.; Magnuson, T.; Moore, M. W.; Nagy, A.; Pollock, J. D.; Roses, A. D.; Sands, A. T.; Seed, B.; Skarnes, W. C.; Snoddy, J.; Soriano, P.; Stewart, D. J.; Stewart, F.; et al. (2004). "The Knockout Mouse Project". Nature Genetics. 36 (9): 921–924. doi:10.1038/ng0904-921. ISSN 1061-4036. PMC 2716027. PMID 15340423.
