= Maximum time in grade =

Maximum time in grade in the US military is the longest amount of time that an officer or enlisted person is allowed to remain in the service without being promoted. If they have not been promoted by the time they reaches MTIG, they are discharged from the service. Today, a recruit may enter the service at 17 years old and stay in service until age 65, for a total of 48 years of service.

== Record holder ==
The record holder for the longest enlisted service is Chief Torpedoeman Harry Simond Morris (1887–1975), who entered the U.S. Navy at age 15 as an apprentice boy, and served for 55 years of continuous service, a record that cannot be surpassed under current regulations.

Morris was the last living apprentice boy entitled to wear the apprentice "knot" on his uniform, and he was the founder and chairman of the "Great White Fleet Association," which held annual reunion dinners to commemorate the cruise at the U. S. Grant Hotel in downtown San Diego.
